= Carleton (New Brunswick provincial electoral district, 1834–1974) =

Defunct provincial electoral district in New Brunswick, Canada

New Brunswick electoral district

Defunct provincial electoral district
- Legislature: Legislative Assembly of New Brunswick
- District created: 1834
- District abolished: 1973
- First contested: 1835
- Last contested: 1970

Carleton was an electoral district that elected members to the Legislative Assembly of New Brunswick (now a province of Canada) from 1824 to 1974. Its boundaries were those of Carleton County and the number of members it returned varied over the years.

It was abolished in the 1973 electoral redistribution when the province moved to single member districts; at the time it elected three members and it was split into three single member districts: Carleton North, Carleton Centre, and Carleton South.

During its time, three premiers represented the riding: James Kidd Flemming, Hugh John Flemming, and Richard Hatfield.

== Members of the Legislative Assembly ==
Legislature	Years	Member	Party	Member	Party	Member	Party
Riding created from York
11th	1835 – 1837	Jeremiah M. Connell	Ind.	George Morehouse	Ind.		
12th	1837 – 1842	Jeremiah M. Connell	Ind.	Bartholomew C. Beardsley	Ind.		
13th	1843 – 1846	Jeremiah M. Connell	Ind.	Charles Perley	Ind.		
14th	1847 – 1850	Charles Connell	Ind.	James Tibbits	Ind.		
15th	1851 – 1854	Charles Connell	Ind.	Horace H. Beardsley	Ind.		
16th	1854 – 1856	Charles Connell	Ind.	Richard English	Ind.		
17th	1856 – 1857	Charles Connell	Ind.	Charles Perley	Ind.		
18th	1857 – 1861	Charles Connell	Ind.	Charles Perley	Ind.		
19th	1862 – 1865	David Munro	Ind.	William Lindsay	Lib.		
20th	1865 – 1866	Charles Connell	Ind.	William Lindsay	Lib.		
21st	1866 – 1867	Charles Connell	Ind.	William Lindsay	Lib.		
21st	1867 – 1868	James Hartley	Ind.	William Lindsay	Lib.		
21st	1868 – 1870	George W. White	Cons.	William Lindsay	Lib.		
22nd	1870 – 1874	George W. White	Cons.	William Lindsay	Lib.		
23rd	1875 – 1878	John S. Leighton	Lib.	Randolph K. Jones	Ind.		
24th	1879 – 1882	John S. Leighton	Lib.	George W. White	Cons.		
25th	1883 – 1886	John S. Leighton	Lib.	George W. White	Cons.		
26th	1886 – 1890	George R. Ketchum	Lib.	Marcus C. Atkinson	Lib.-Con.		
27th	1890 – 1892	George R. Ketchum	Lib.	Marcus C. Atkinson	Lib.-Con.		
28th	1892 – 1895	Henry A. Connell	Ind.	J.T. Allan Dibblee	Lib.-Con.		
28th	1895	Marcus C. Atkinson	Lib.-Con.	J.T. Allan Dibblee	Lib.-Con.		
29th	1896 – 1899	Hugh H. McCain	Lib.	J.T. Allan Dibblee	Lib.-Con.	Charles L. Smith	Lib.
30th	1899 – 1900	Hugh H. McCain	Lib.	Frank B. Carvell	Lib.	Charles L. Smith	Lib.
30th	1900 – 1903	Hugh H. McCain	Lib.	James K. Flemming	Cons.	Stephen B. Appleby	Lib.
31st	1903 – 1908	Benjamin F. Smith	Cons.	James K. Flemming	Cons.	Wendell P. Jones	Lib.
32nd	1908	Benjamin F. Smith	Cons.	James K. Flemming	Cons.	Donald Munro	Ind.
32nd	1908 – 1912	George W. Upham	Ind.	James K. Flemming	Cons.	Donald Munro	Ind.
33rd	1912 – 1915	George L. White	Cons.	James K. Flemming	Cons.	Donald Munro	Ind.
33rd	1915 – 1916	George L. White	Cons.	Benjamin F. Smith	Cons.	Donald Munro	Ind.
33rd	1916 – 1917	George L. White	Cons.	Benjamin F. Smith	Cons.	William S. Sutton	Cons.
34th	1917 – 1920	George L. White	Cons.	Benjamin F. Smith	Cons.	William S. Sutton	Cons.
35th	1921 – 1925	Fred W. Smith	UF	Rennie K. Tracey	UF	Samuel J. Burlock	UF
36th	1925 – 1930	Fred C. Squires	Cons.	Edwin W. Melville	Cons.	Benjamin F. Smith	Cons.
37th	1931 – 1935	Fred C. Squires	Cons.	Edwin W. Melville	Cons.	Gladstone W. Perry	Cons.
38th	1935 – 1939	Fred C. Squires	Cons.	Edwin W. Melville	Cons.	Gladstone W. Perry	Cons.
39th	1939 – 1944	Fred C. Squires	Cons.	Edwin W. Melville	Cons.	Gladstone W. Perry	Cons.
40th	1944 – 1948	Fred C. Squires	PC	Hugh J. Flemming	PC	Gladstone W. Perry	PC
41st	1948 – 1952	John (Jock) Fraser	Lib.	Hugh J. Flemming	PC	Gladstone W. Perry	PC
42nd	1952 – 1956	Fred A. McCain	PC	Hugh J. Flemming	PC	Harrison C. Monteith	PC
43rd	1957 – 1960	Fred A. McCain	PC	Hugh J. Flemming	PC	Harrison C. Monteith	PC
44th	1960 – 1961	Fred A. McCain	PC	Hugh J. Flemming	PC	A. Edison Stairs	PC
44th	1961 – 1963	Fred A. McCain	PC	Richard B. Hatfield	PC	A. Edison Stairs	PC
45th	1963 – 1967	Fred A. McCain	PC	Richard B. Hatfield	PC	A. Edison Stairs	PC
46th	1967 – 1970	Fred A. McCain	PC	Richard B. Hatfield	PC	A. Edison Stairs	PC
47th	1970 – 1974	Charles Gallagher	PC	Richard B. Hatfield	PC	A. Edison Stairs	PC
Riding dissolved into Carleton Centre, Carleton North and Carleton South

== Election results ==
1970 New Brunswick general election
Party	Candidate	Votes	Elected
Progressive Conservative	Richard B. Hatfield	6,695	✓
Progressive Conservative	Charles Gallagher	6,104	✓
Progressive Conservative	Edison Stairs	5,881	✓
Liberal	James E. Patterson	2,711	
Liberal	Charles E. Russell	2,528	
Liberal	Robert Caines	2,523	
New Democratic	Barry Morrison	208	
New Democratic	James Wallace, Jr.	164	
New Democratic	Samo Stehlik	145	

1967 New Brunswick general election
Party	Candidate	Votes	Elected
Progressive Conservative	Richard B. Hatfield	5,907	✓
Progressive Conservative	Fred A. McCain	5,581	✓
Progressive Conservative	Edison Stairs	5,536	✓
Liberal	Robert R. "Bob" McCain	4,559	
Liberal	Hugh Tait	4,059	
Liberal	Christine Young	3,702	

== See also ==
- List of New Brunswick provincial electoral districts
- Canadian provincial electoral districts
