= List of members of the Canadian House of Commons (C) =

== Cac–Cal ==
- Charles Caccia b. 1930 first elected in 1968 as Liberal member for Davenport, Ontario.
- Bert Cadieu b. 1903 first elected in 1958 as Progressive Conservative member for Meadow Lake, Saskatchewan.
- Léo Alphonse Joseph Cadieux b. 1908 first elected in 1962 as Liberal member for Terrebonne, Quebec.
- Pierre H. Cadieux b. 1948 first elected in 1984 as Progressive Conservative member for Vaudreuil, Quebec.
- Chuck Cadman b. 1948 first elected in 1997 as Reform member for Surrey North, British Columbia.
- Dona Cadman b. 1950 first elected in 2008 as Conservative member for Surrey North, British Columbia.
- Celina Caesar-Chavannes b. 1974 first elected in 2015 as Liberal member for Whitby, Ontario.
- Norman Cafik b. 1928 first elected in 1968 as Liberal member for Ontario, Ontario.
- Charles Hazlitt Cahan b. 1861 first elected in 1925 as Conservative member for St. Lawrence—St. George, Quebec.
- Frank S. Cahill b. 1876 first elected in 1917 as Laurier Liberal member for Pontiac, Quebec.
- Paul Calandra b. 1970 first elected in 2008 as Conservative member for Oak Ridges—Markham, Ontario.
- James Alexander Calder b. 1868 first elected in 1917 as Unionist member for Moose Jaw, Saskatchewan.
- Murray Calder b. 1951 first elected in 1993 as Liberal member for Wellington—Grey—Dufferin—Simcoe, Ontario.
- James Eber Caldwell b. 1943 first elected in 1984 as Progressive Conservative member for Essex—Kent, Ontario.
- Thomas Boyd Caldwell b. 1856 first elected in 1904 as Liberal member for Lanark North, Ontario.
- Thomas Wakem Caldwell b. 1867 first elected in 1919 as United Farmers member for Victoria—Carleton, New Brunswick.
- William Murray Caldwell b. 1832 first elected in 1868 as Liberal member for Restigouche, New Brunswick.
- Braeden Caley first elected in 2026 as Liberal member for North Vancouver—Capilano, British Columbia.
- Blaine Calkins b. 1968 first elected in 2006 as Conservative member for Wetaskiwin, Alberta.
- Catherine Callbeck b. 1939 first elected in 1988 as Liberal member for Malpeque, Prince Edward Island.
- William Samuel Calvert b. 1859 first elected in 1896 as Liberal member for Middlesex West, Ontario.
- Hiram Augustus Calvin b. 1851 first elected in 1892 as Independent Conservative member for Frontenac, Ontario.

== Cam ==
- Pat Cameron b. 1895 first elected in 1949 as Liberal member for High Park, Ontario.
- Colin Cameron b. 1896 first elected in 1953 as CCF member for Nanaimo, British Columbia.
- Daniel Alexander Cameron b. 1870 first elected in 1935 as Liberal member for Cape Breton North and Victoria, Nova Scotia.
- Donald Mackenzie Cameron b. 1843 first elected in 1883 as Liberal member for Middlesex West, Ontario.
- Donald Niel Cameron b. 1917 first elected in 1979 as Progressive Conservative member for Kamloops—Shuswap, British Columbia.
- Hector Cameron b. 1832 first elected in 1875 as Conservative member for Victoria North, Ontario.
- Hugh Cameron b. 1836 first elected in 1867 as Anti-Confederate member for Inverness, Nova Scotia.
- John Charles Alexander Cameron b. 1891 first elected in 1935 as Liberal member for Hastings South, Ontario.
- John Hillyard Cameron b. 1817 first elected in 1867 as Conservative member for Peel, Ontario.
- Malcolm Cameron b. 1808 first elected in 1874 as Liberal member for Ontario South, Ontario.
- Malcolm Colin Cameron b. 1832 first elected in 1867 as Liberal member for Huron South, Ontario.
- Iona Campagnolo b. 1932 first elected in 1974 as Liberal member for Skeena, British Columbia.
- A. Kim Campbell b. 1947 first elected in 1988 as Progressive Conservative member for Vancouver Centre, British Columbia.
- Alexander Maxwell Campbell b. 1888 first elected in 1945 as CCF member for The Battlefords, Saskatchewan.
- Archibald Campbell b. 1845 first elected in 1887 as Liberal member for Kent, Ontario.
- Barry R. Campbell b. 1950 first elected in 1993 as Liberal member for St. Paul's, Ontario.
- Charles James Campbell b. 1819 first elected in 1874 as Conservative member for Victoria, Nova Scotia.
- Colin Alexander Campbell b. 1901 first elected in 1934 as Liberal member for Frontenac—Addington, Ontario.
- Coline M. Campbell b. 1940 first elected in 1974 as Liberal member for South Western Nova, Nova Scotia.
- Ernest John Campbell b. 1903 first elected in 1957 as Progressive Conservative member for Lambton—Kent, Ontario.
- Glenlyon Campbell b. 1863 first elected in 1908 as Conservative member for Dauphin, Manitoba.
- Grant Campbell b. 1922 first elected in 1958 as Progressive Conservative member for Stormont, Ontario.
- John Campbell b. 1849 first elected in 1887 as Conservative member for Digby, Nova Scotia.
- John Campbell b. 1936 first elected in 1972 as Liberal member for Lasalle, Quebec.
- John Archibald Campbell b. 1872 first elected in 1917 as Unionist member for Nelson, Manitoba.
- Milton Neil Campbell b. 1881 first elected in 1921 as Progressive member for Mackenzie, Saskatchewan.
- Robert Campbell b. 1818 first elected in 1882 as Liberal member for Renfrew South, Ontario.
- Stewart Campbell b. 1812 first elected in 1867 as Anti-Confederate member for Guysborough, Nova Scotia.
- W. Bennett Campbell b. 1943 first elected in 1981 as Liberal member for Cardigan, Prince Edward Island.
- William Campbell b. 1929 first elected in 1979 as Progressive Conservative member for Sarnia, Ontario.
- Charles-Édouard Campeau b. 1916 first elected in 1958 as Progressive Conservative member for Saint-Jacques, Quebec.
- Ralph Osborne Campney b. 1894 first elected in 1949 as Liberal member for Vancouver Centre, British Columbia.

== Can–Cap ==
- Ron Cannan b. 1961 first elected in 2006 as Conservative member for Kelowna—Lake Country, British Columbia.
- Richard Cannings b. 1954 as New Democratic Party member for South Okanagan—West Kootenay, British Columbia.
- John Cannis b. 1951 first elected in 1993 as Liberal member for Scarborough Centre, Ontario.
- Charles-Arthur Dumoulin Cannon b. 1905 first elected in 1949 as Liberal member for Îles-de-la-Madeleine, Quebec.
- Lawrence Cannon b. 1947 first elected in 2006 as Conservative member for Pontiac, Quebec.
- Lucien Cannon b. 1887 first elected in 1917 as Laurier Liberal member for Dorchester, Quebec.
- Reg Cantelon b. 1902 first elected in 1963 as Progressive Conservative member for Kindersley, Saskatchewan.
- Jean-Charles Cantin b. 1918 first elected in 1962 as Liberal member for Quebec South, Quebec.
- Thomas Cantley b. 1857 first elected in 1925 as Conservative member for Pictou, Nova Scotia.
- René Canuel b. 1936 first elected in 1993 as Bloc Québécois member for Matapédia—Matane, Quebec.
- Armand Caouette b. 1945 first elected in 1974 as Social Credit member for Villeneuve, Quebec.
- David Réal Caouette b. 1917 first elected in 1946 as Social Credit member for Pontiac, Quebec.
- Gilles Caouette b. 1940 first elected in 1972 as Social Credit member for Charlevoix, Quebec.
- Elinor Caplan b. 1944 first elected in 1997 as Liberal member for Thornhill, Ontario.
- Frank Caputo first elected in 2021 as Conservative member for Kamloops—Thompson—Cariboo, British Columbia.

== Carb–Caro ==
- Onésiphore Carbonneau b. 1852 first elected in 1902 as Liberal member for L'Islet, Quebec.
- Lewis Elston Cardiff b. 1889 first elected in 1940 as National Government member for Huron North, Ontario.
- Murray Cardiff b. 1934 first elected in 1980 as Progressive Conservative member for Huron—Bruce, Ontario.
- Louis-Joseph-Lucien Cardin b. 1919 first elected in 1952 as Liberal member for Richelieu—Verchères, Quebec.
- Arthur Cardin b. 1879 first elected in 1911 as Liberal member for Richelieu, Quebec.
- Serge Cardin b. 1950 first elected in 1998 as Bloc Québécois member for Sherbrooke, Quebec.
- Henry Cargill b. 1838 first elected in 1887 as Conservative member for Bruce East, Ontario.
- Jean Guy Carignan b. 1941 first elected in 2000 as Liberal member for Québec East, Quebec.
- Onésime Carignan b. 1839 first elected in 1891 as Conservative member for Champlain, Quebec.
- John Carling b. 1828 first elected in 1867 as Liberal-Conservative member for London, Ontario.
- Archibald M. Carmichael b. 1882 first elected in 1921 as Progressive member for Kindersley, Saskatchewan.
- James William Carmichael b. 1819 first elected in 1867 as Anti-Confederate member for Pictou, Nova Scotia.
- John Carmichael b. 1952 first elected in 2011 as Conservative member for Don Valley West, Ontario.
- Mark Carney b. 1965 first elected in 2025 as Liberal member for Nepean, Ontario.
- Michael Carney b. 1839 first elected in 1904 as Liberal member for Halifax, Nova Scotia.
- Patricia Carney b. 1935 first elected in 1980 as Progressive Conservative member for Vancouver Centre, British Columbia.
- Alexis Pierre Caron b. 1899 first elected in 1953 as Liberal member for Hull, Quebec.
- André Caron b. 1944 first elected in 1993 as Bloc Québécois member for Jonquière, Quebec.
- George Caron b. 1823 first elected in 1867 as Conservative member for Maskinongé, Quebec.
- Guy Caron b. 1968 first elected in 2011 as New Democratic Party member for Rimouski-Neigette—Témiscouata—Les Basques, Quebec.
- Jean-Baptiste Thomas Caron b. 1869 first elected in 1907 as Liberal member for Ottawa (City of), Ontario.
- Joseph Philippe René Adolphe Caron b. 1843 first elected in 1873 as Conservative member for Quebec County, Quebec.
- Pierre Caron b. 1936 first elected in 1967 as Liberal member for Hull, Quebec.
- Yves Caron b. 1937 first elected in 1972 as Liberal member for Beauce, Quebec.

== Carp–Carv ==
- Franklin Metcalfe Carpenter b. 1847 first elected in 1887 as Conservative member for Wentworth South, Ontario.
- Gary Carr b. 1955 first elected in 2004 as Liberal member for Halton, Ontario.
- Ben Carr b. 1986 first elected in 2023 as Liberal member for Winnipeg South Centre, Manitoba.
- Jim Carr b. 1951 first elected in 2015 as Liberal member for Winnipeg South Centre, Manitoba.
- Donald Carrick b. 1906 first elected in 1954 as Liberal member for Trinity, Ontario.
- John James Carrick b. 1873 first elected in 1911 as Conservative member for Thunder Bay and Rainy River, Ontario.
- Colin Carrie b. 1962 first elected in 2004 as Conservative member for Oshawa, Ontario.
- Louis Auguste Carrier b. 1858 first elected in 1905 as Liberal member for Lévis, Quebec.
- Robert Carrier b. 1941 first elected in 2004 as Bloc Québécois member for Alfred-Pellan, Quebec.
- Henry George Carroll b. 1865 first elected in 1891 as Liberal member for Kamouraska, Quebec.
- M. Aileen Carroll b. 1944 first elected in 1997 as Liberal member for Barrie—Simcoe—Bradford, Ontario.
- William F. Carroll b. 1877 first elected in 1911 as Liberal member for Cape Breton South, Nova Scotia.
- John Carruthers b. 1863 first elected in 1921 as Liberal member for Algoma East, Ontario.
- Alexander Augustus Williamson Carscallen b. 1844 first elected in 1892 as Conservative member for Hastings North, Ontario.
- Chesley William Carter b. 1902 first elected in 1949 as Liberal member for Burin—Burgeo, Newfoundland and Labrador.
- Edward Carter b. 1822 first elected in 1871 as Conservative member for Brome, Quebec.
- Walter C. Carter b. 1929 first elected in 1968 as Progressive Conservative member for St. John's West, Newfoundland and Labrador.
- George-Étienne Cartier b. 1814 first elected in 1867 as Liberal-Conservative member for Montreal East, Quebec.
- Richard John Cartwright b. 1835 first elected in 1867 as Conservative member for Lennox, Ontario.
- Frank Broadstreet Carvell b. 1862 first elected in 1904 as Liberal member for Carleton, New Brunswick.

== Cas–Cay ==
- Louis Napoléon Casault b. 1823 first elected in 1867 as Conservative member for Bellechasse, Quebec.
- Wilfrid Garfield Case b. 1898 first elected in 1945 as Progressive Conservative member for Grey North, Ontario.
- George Elliott Casey b. 1850 first elected in 1872 as Liberal member for Elgin West, Ontario.
- Sean Casey b. 1963 first elected in 2011 as Liberal member for Charlottetown, Prince Edward Island.
- William D. Casey b. 1945 first elected in 1988 as Progressive Conservative member for Cumberland—Colchester, Nova Scotia.
- Philippe Baby Casgrain b. 1826 first elected in 1872 as Liberal member for L'Islet, Quebec.
- Pierre-François Casgrain b. 1886 first elected in 1917 as Laurier Liberal member for Charlevoix—Montmorency, Quebec.
- Thomas Chase Casgrain b. 1852 first elected in 1896 as Conservative member for Montmorency, Quebec.
- Andrew Cash b. 1962 first elected in 2011 as New Democratic Party member for Davenport, Ontario.
- Edward L. Cash b. 1849 first elected in 1904 as Liberal member for Mackenzie, Northwest Territories.
- Richard Joseph Cashin b. 1937 first elected in 1962 as Liberal member for St. John's West, Newfoundland and Labrador.
- Arza Clair Casselman b. 1891 first elected in 1921 as Conservative member for Grenville, Ontario.
- Cora Taylor Casselman b. 1888 first elected in 1941 as Liberal member for Edmonton East, Alberta.
- Frederick Clayton Casselman b. 1885 first elected in 1940 as Liberal member for Edmonton East, Alberta.
- Orren D. Casselman b. 1862 first elected in 1917 as Unionist member for Dundas, Ontario.
- Michael Cassidy b. 1937 first elected in 1984 as New Democratic Party member for Ottawa Centre, Ontario.
- Rick Casson b. 1948 first elected in 1997 as Reform member for Lethbridge, Alberta.
- George Hugh Castleden b. 1895 first elected in 1940 as CCF member for Yorkton, Saskatchewan.
- Douglas Marmaduke Caston b. 1917 first elected in 1967 as Progressive Conservative member for Jasper—Edson, Alberta.
- Jeannot Castonguay b. 1944 first elected in 2000 as Liberal member for Madawaska—Restigouche, New Brunswick.
- Cecil A. Cathers b. 1901 first elected in 1957 as Progressive Conservative member for York North, Ontario.
- A. Earl Catherwood b. 1900 first elected in 1949 as Progressive Conservative member for Haldimand, Ontario.
- Marlene Catterall b. 1939 first elected in 1988 as Liberal member for Ottawa West, Ontario.
- Médéric Catudal b. 1856 first elected in 1882 as Liberal member for Napierville, Quebec.
- Joseph-Édouard Cauchon b. 1816 first elected in 1867 as Conservative member for Montmorency, Quebec.
- Martin Cauchon b. 1962 first elected in 1993 as Liberal member for Outremont, Quebec.
- Robert Cauchon b. 1900 first elected in 1949 as Liberal member for Beauharnois, Quebec.
- Harry Peter Cavers b. 1909 first elected in 1949 as Liberal member for Lincoln, Ontario.
- Michael Cayley b. 1842 first elected in 1867 as Conservative member for Beauharnois, Quebec.
- Thomas Merritt Cayley b. 1878 first elected in 1926 as Liberal member for Oxford South, Ontario.

== Chab–Chan ==
- Benoît Chabot b. 1911 first elected in 1957 as Independent member for Kamouraska, Quebec.
- John Léo Chabot b. 1869 first elected in 1911 as Conservative member for Ottawa (City of), Ontario.
- Louise Chabot b. 1955 first elected in 2019 as Bloc Québécois member for Thérèse-De Blainville, Quebec.
- Harry Chadwick b. 1930 first elected in 1988 as Progressive Conservative member for Brampton—Malton, Ontario.
- Bardish Chagger b. 1980 first elected in 2015 as Liberal member for Waterloo, Ontario.
- George Chahal b. 1975 first elected in 2021 as Liberal member for Calgary Skyview, Alberta.
- Brenda Kay Chamberlain b. 1952 first elected in 1993 as Liberal member for Guelph—Wellington, Ontario.
- Brown Chamberlin b. 1827 first elected in 1867 as Conservative member for Missisquoi, Quebec.
- Adam Chambers first elected in 2021 as Conservative member for Simcoe North, Ontario.
- Alan Chambers b. 1904 first elected in 1940 as Liberal member for Nanaimo, British Columbia.
- Egan Chambers b. 1921 first elected in 1958 as Progressive Conservative member for St. Lawrence—St. George, Quebec.
- Albert Champagne b. 1866 first elected in 1908 as Liberal member for Battleford, Saskatchewan.
- Andrée P. Champagne b. 1939 first elected in 1984 as Progressive Conservative member for Saint-Hyacinthe—Bagot, Quebec.
- François-Philippe Champagne b. 1970 first elected in 2015 as Liberal member for Saint-Maurice—Champlain, Quebec.
- Louis Napoléon Champagne b. 1860 first elected in 1897 as Liberal member for Wright, Quebec.
- Michel Champagne b. 1956 first elected in 1984 as Progressive Conservative member for Champlain, Quebec.
- Martin Champoux b. 1968 first elected in 2019 as Bloc Québécois member for Drummond, Quebec.
- Arnold Chan b. 1967 first elected in 2014 as Liberal member for Scarborough—Agincourt, Ontario.
- Raymond Chan b. 1951 first elected in 1993 as Liberal member for Richmond, British Columbia.
- Edmund Leavens Chandler b. 1829 first elected in 1878 as Liberal member for Brome, Quebec.
- Wade Chang first elected in 2025 as Liberal member for Burnaby Central, British Columbia.

== Chap–Chau ==
- Gérard Chapdelaine b. 1935 first elected in 1962 as Social Credit member for Sherbrooke, Quebec.
- Renaud Chapdelaine b. 1911 first elected in 1949 as Progressive Conservative member for Nicolet—Yamaska, Quebec.
- Joseph-Adolphe Chapleau b. 1840 first elected in 1882 as Conservative member for Terrebonne, Quebec.
- Alexander Dew Chaplin b. 1872 first elected in 1925 as Conservative member for Kent, Ontario.
- Gordon Chaplin b. 1907 first elected in 1962 as Progressive Conservative member for Waterloo South, Ontario.
- James Dew Chaplin b. 1863 first elected in 1917 as Unionist member for Lincoln, Ontario.
- Hyliard G. Chappell b. 1916 first elected in 1968 as Liberal member for Peel South, Ontario.
- Louise Charbonneau b. 1951 first elected in 2019 as Bloc Québécois member for Trois-Rivières, Quebec.
- Napoléon Charbonneau b. 1853 first elected in 1895 as Liberal member for Jacques Cartier, Quebec.
- Yvon Charbonneau b. 1940 first elected in 1997 as Liberal member for Anjou—Rivière-des-Prairies, Quebec.
- Jean Charest b. 1958 first elected in 1984 as Progressive Conservative member for Sherbrooke, Quebec.
- Chris Charlton b. 1963 first elected in 2006 as New Democratic Party member for Hamilton Mountain, Ontario.
- John Charlton b. 1829 first elected in 1872 as Liberal member for Norfolk North, Ontario.
- John Alpheus Charlton b. 1907 first elected in 1945 as Progressive Conservative member for Brant, Ontario.
- William Andrew Charlton b. 1841 first elected in 1911 as Liberal member for Norfolk, Ontario.
- Samuel Charters b. 1863 first elected in 1917 as Unionist member for Peel, Ontario.
- Gilbert Chartrand b. 1954 first elected in 1984 as Progressive Conservative member for Verdun—Saint-Paul, Quebec.
- Rebecca Chartrand first elected in 2025 as Liberal member for Churchill—Keewatinook Aski, Manitoba.
- Sophie Chatel first elected in 2021 as Liberal member for Pontiac, Quebec.
- David Chatters b. 1946 first elected in 1993 as Reform member for Athabasca, Alberta.
- George Louis Chatterton b. 1916 first elected in 1961 as Progressive Conservative member for Esquimalt—Saanich, British Columbia.
- Andrew Chatwood b. 1932 first elected in 1966 as Liberal member for Grand Falls—White Bay—Labrador, Newfoundland and Labrador.
- Pierre-Joseph-Olivier Chauveau b. 1820 first elected in 1867 as Conservative member for Quebec County, Quebec.
- Léon Adolphe Chauvin b. 1861 first elected in 1896 as Conservative member for Terrebonne, Quebec.

== Che–Chi ==
- Shaun Chen b. 1980 first elected in 2015 as Liberal member for Scarborough North, Ontario.
- Madeleine Chenette first elected in 2025 as Liberal member for Thérèse-De Blainville, Quebec.
- Ray Chénier b. 1935 first elected in 1979 as Liberal member for Timmins—Chapleau, Ontario.
- John A. Chesley b. 1837 first elected in 1892 as Conservative member for City and County of St. John, New Brunswick.
- Guillaume Cheval dit St-Jacques b. 1828 first elected in 1867 as Liberal member for Rouville, Quebec.
- Edgar-Rodolphe-Eugène Chevrier b. 1887 first elected in 1921 as Liberal member for Ottawa (City of), Ontario.
- Lionel Chevrier b. 1903 first elected in 1935 as Liberal member for Stormont, Ontario.
- Thomas Edward Manley Chew b. 1874 first elected in 1908 as Liberal member for Simcoe East, Ontario.
- Maggie Chi first elected in 2025 as Liberal member for Don Valley North, Ontario.
- Paul Chiang b. 1960 first elected in 2021 as Liberal member for Markham—Unionville, Ontario.
- Sylvain Chicoine b. 1970 first elected in 2011 as New Democratic Party member for Châteauguay—Saint-Constant, Quebec.
- Leverett de Veber Chipman b. 1831 first elected in 1870 as Liberal member for Kings, Nova Scotia.
- William Henry Chipman b. 1807 first elected in 1867 as Anti-Confederate member for Kings, Nova Scotia.
- Alexander William Chisholm b. 1869 first elected in 1908 as Liberal member for Inverness, Nova Scotia.
- Daniel Black Chisholm b. 1842 first elected in 1872 as Liberal-Conservative member for Hamilton, Ontario.
- Donald Chisholm b. 1822 first elected in 1887 as Conservative member for New Westminster, British Columbia.
- Robert Chisholm b. 1957 as New Democrat member for Dartmouth—Cole Harbour, Nova Scotia
- Thomas Chisholm b. 1842 first elected in 1904 as Conservative member for Huron East, Ontario.
- William Chisholm b. 1870 first elected in 1905 as Liberal member for Antigonish, Nova Scotia.
- Corneliu Chisu b. 1949 first elected in 2011 as Conservative member for Pickering—Scarborough East, Ontario.
- Kenny Chiu b. 1965 first elected in 2019 as Conservative member for Steveston—Richmond East, British Columbia.

== Cho–Chu ==
- Michael Chong b. 1971 first elected in 2004 as Conservative member for Wellington—Halton Hills, Ontario.
- Auguste Choquette b. 1932 first elected in 1963 as Liberal member for Lotbinière, Quebec.
- François Choquette b. 1974 first elected in 2011 as New Democratic Party member for Drummond, Quebec.
- Joseph Armand Choquette b. 1905 first elected in 1943 as Bloc populaire canadien member for Stanstead, Quebec.
- Philippe-Auguste Choquette b. 1854 first elected in 1887 as Liberal member for Montmagny, Quebec.
- Honoré Julien Jean-Baptiste Chouinard b. 1850 first elected in 1888 as Conservative member for Dorchester, Quebec.
- Olivia Chow b. 1957 first elected in 2006 as New Democratic Party member for Trinity—Spadina, Ontario.
- Gordon Chown b. 1922 first elected in 1957 as Progressive Conservative member for Winnipeg South, Manitoba.
- Jean Chrétien b. 1934 first elected in 1963 as Liberal member for Saint-Maurice—Laflèche, Quebec.
- Jean-Guy Chrétien b. 1946 first elected in 1993 as Bloc Québécois member for Frontenac, Quebec.
- Frank Claus Christian b. 1911 first elected in 1957 as Social Credit member for Okanagan Boundary, British Columbia.
- Peter Christie b. 1846 first elected in 1904 as Conservative member for Ontario South, Ontario.
- Thomas Christie b. 1824 first elected in 1875 as Liberal member for Argenteuil, Quebec.
- Thomas Christie, Jr. b. 1855 first elected in 1902 as Liberal member for Argenteuil, Quebec.
- David Christopherson b. 1954 first elected in 2004 as New Democratic Party member for Hamilton Centre, Ontario.
- Charles Edward Church b. 1835 first elected in 1872 as Liberal member for Lunenburg, Nova Scotia.
- Leslie Church first elected in 2025 as Liberal member for Toronto—St. Paul's, Ontario.
- Thomas Langton Church b. 1870 first elected in 1921 as Conservative member for Toronto North, Ontario.
- Gordon Minto Churchill b. 1898 first elected in 1951 as Progressive Conservative member for Winnipeg South Centre, Manitoba.

== Ci ==
- Marie Honorius Ernest Cimon b. 1849 first elected in 1874 as Conservative member for Chicoutimi—Saguenay, Quebec.
- Simon Cimon b. 1852 first elected in 1887 as Conservative member for Charlevoix, Quebec.
- Simon Xavier Cimon b. 1829 first elected in 1867 as Conservative member for Charlevoix, Quebec.

== Cla ==
- Gordon Drummond Clancy b. 1912 first elected in 1958 as Progressive Conservative member for Yorkton, Saskatchewan.
- James Clancy b. 1844 first elected in 1896 as Conservative member for Bothwell, Ontario.
- Mary Catherine Clancy b. 1948 first elected in 1988 as Liberal member for Halifax, Nova Scotia.
- George Adam Clare b. 1854 first elected in 1900 as Conservative member for Waterloo South, Ontario.
- Braedon Clark b. 1988 first elected in 2025 as Liberal member for Sackville—Bedford—Preston, Nova Scotia
- Charles Joseph Clark b. 1939 first elected in 1972 as Progressive Conservative member for Rocky Mountain, Alberta.
- Hugh Clark b. 1867 first elected in 1911 as Conservative member for Bruce North, Ontario.
- John Clark b. 1835 first elected in 1896 as Liberal member for Grey North, Ontario.
- John Arthur Clark b. 1886 first elected in 1921 as Conservative member for Burrard, British Columbia.
- Michael Clark b. 1861 first elected in 1908 as Liberal member for Red Deer, Alberta.
- Stuart Murray Clark b. 1899 first elected in 1935 as Liberal member for Essex South, Ontario.
- Walter Leland Rutherford Clark b. 1936 first elected in 1983 as Progressive Conservative member for Brandon—Souris, Manitoba.
- William George Clark b. 1865 first elected in 1935 as Liberal member for York—Sunbury, New Brunswick.
- Alfred Henry Clarke b. 1860 first elected in 1904 as Liberal member for Essex South, Ontario.
- Alupa Clarke b. 1986 first elected in 2015 as Conservative member for Beauport—Limoilou, Quebec.
- Edward Frederick Clarke b. 1850 first elected in 1896 as Conservative member for West Toronto, Ontario.
- Harry Gladstone Clarke b. 1881 first elected in 1935 as Conservative member for Rosedale, Ontario.
- Rob Clarke b. 1967 first elected in 2008 as Conservative member for Desnethé—Missinippi—Churchill River, Saskatchewan.
- William Aurelius Clarke b. 1868 first elected in 1911 as Conservative member for Wellington North, Ontario.
- William Hillary Clarke b. 1933 first elected in 1972 as Progressive Conservative member for Vancouver Quadra, British Columbia.
- Roger Clavet b. 1953 first elected in 2004 as Bloc Québécois member for Louis-Hébert, Quebec.
- Brooke Claxton b. 1898 first elected in 1940 as Liberal member for St. Lawrence—St. George, Quebec.
- George Clayes b. 1831 first elected in 1887 as Liberal member for Missisquoi, Quebec.

== Cle–Clu ==
- Bernard Cleary b. 1937 first elected in 2004 as Bloc Québécois member for Louis-Saint-Laurent, Quebec.
- Ryan Cleary b. 1966 first elected in 2011 as New Democratic member for St. John's South—Mount Pearl, Newfoundland and Labrador.
- Hughes Cleaver b. 1892 first elected in 1935 as Liberal member for Halton, Ontario.
- Tony Clement b. 1961 first elected in 2006 as Conservative member for Parry Sound-Muskoka, Ontario.
- Herbert Sylvester Clements b. 1865 first elected in 1904 as Conservative member for Kent West, Ontario.
- Gaston Clermont b. 1913 first elected in 1960 as Liberal member for Labelle, Quebec.
- Clarence Chester Cleveland b. 1849 first elected in 1891 as Conservative member for Richmond—Wolfe, Quebec.
- Lawson Omar Clifford b. 1878 first elected in 1921 as Liberal member for Ontario South, Ontario.
- Terrence Clifford b. 1938 first elected in 1984 as Progressive Conservative member for London—Middlesex, Ontario.
- J. Roger Clinch b. 1947 first elected in 1984 as Progressive Conservative member for Gloucester, New Brunswick.
- Hector Daniel Clouthier b. 1949 first elected in 1997 as Liberal member for Renfrew—Nipissing—Pembroke, Ontario.
- Armand Cloutier b. 1901 first elected in 1940 as Liberal member for Drummond—Arthabaska, Quebec.
- Sidney LeRoi Clunis b. 1911 first elected in 1962 as Liberal member for Kent, Ontario.
- William Cluxton b. 1819 first elected in 1872 as Conservative member for Peterborough West, Ontario.

== Coa–Col ==
- Siobhán Coady b. 1960 first elected in 2008 as Liberal member for St. John's South—Mount Pearl, Newfoundland and Labrador.
- Robert Carman Coates b. 1928 first elected in 1957 as Progressive Conservative member for Cumberland, Nova Scotia.
- Emerson Coatsworth b. 1854 first elected in 1891 as Conservative member for Toronto East, Ontario.
- Gerald Richard Cobbe b. 1927 first elected in 1968 as Liberal member for Portage, Manitoba.
- Sandra Cobena first elected in 2025 as Conservative member for Newmarket—Aurora.
- Dennis H. Cochrane b. 1950 first elected in 1984 as Progressive Conservative member for Moncton, New Brunswick.
- Edward Cochrane b. 1834 first elected in 1882 as Conservative member for Northumberland East, Ontario.
- Francis Cochrane b. 1852 first elected in 1911 as Conservative member for Nipissing, Ontario.
- Kenneth Judson Cochrane b. 1896 first elected in 1935 as Liberal member for Cumberland, Nova Scotia.
- Alexander Peter Cockburn b. 1837 first elected in 1872 as Liberal member for Muskoka, Ontario.
- George Ralph Richardson Cockburn b. 1834 first elected in 1887 as Conservative member for Toronto Centre, Ontario.
- James Cockburn b. 1819 first elected in 1867 as Conservative member for Northumberland West, Ontario.
- Alan Cockeram b. 1894 first elected in 1940 as National Government member for York South, Ontario.
- William Foster Cockshutt b. 1855 first elected in 1904 as Conservative member for Brantford, Ontario.
- Desmond Code b. 1912 first elected in 1965 as Progressive Conservative member for Lanark, Ontario.
- Denis Coderre b. 1963 first elected in 1997 as Liberal member for Bourassa, Quebec.
- Louis Coderre b. 1865 first elected in 1911 as Conservative member for Hochelaga, Quebec.
- Connie Cody first elected in 2025 as Conservative member for Cambridge, Ontario.
- Thomas Coffin b. 1817 first elected in 1867 as Anti-Confederate member for Shelburne, Nova Scotia.
- Elizabeth Shaughnessy Cohen b. 1948 first elected in 1993 as Liberal member for Windsor—St. Clair, Ontario.
- Charles Carroll Colby b. 1827 first elected in 1867 as Liberal-Conservative member for Stanstead, Quebec.
- Major James William Coldwell b. 1888 first elected in 1935 as CCF member for Rosetown—Biggar, Saskatchewan.
- John Cole b. 1942 first elected in 1988 as Progressive Conservative member for York—Simcoe, Ontario.
- David Michael Collenette b. 1946 first elected in 1974 as Liberal member for York East, Ontario.
- A.B. Collins b. 1935 first elected in 1993 as Liberal member for Souris—Moose Mountain, Saskatchewan.
- Chad Collins b. 1971 first elected in 2021 as Liberal member for Hamilton East—Stoney Creek, Ontario.
- Laurel Collins b. 1984 first elected in 2019 as New Democratic Party member for Victoria, British Columbia.
- Mary Collins b. 1940 first elected in 1984 as Progressive Conservative member for Capilano, British Columbia.
- Charles Wesley Colter b. 1846 first elected in 1886 as Liberal member for Haldimand, Ontario.
- Newton Ramsay Colter b. 1844 first elected in 1891 as Liberal member for Carleton, New Brunswick.

== Com–Cop ==
- Joe Comartin b. 1947 first elected in 2000 as New Democratic Party member for Windsor—St. Clair, Ontario.
- Gerald J. Comeau b. 1946 first elected in 1984 as Progressive Conservative member for South West Nova, Nova Scotia.
- Louis-Roland Comeau b. 1941 first elected in 1968 as Progressive Conservative member for South Western Nova, Nova Scotia.
- William Henry Comstock b. 1830 first elected in 1899 as Liberal member for Brockville, Ontario.
- Joseph-Roland Comtois b. 1929 first elected in 1965 as Liberal member for Joliette—l'Assomption—Montcalm, Quebec.
- Paul Comtois b. 1895 first elected in 1957 as Progressive Conservative member for Nicolet—Yamaska, Quebec.
- Joseph R. Comuzzi b. 1933 first elected in 1988 as Liberal member for Thunder Bay—Nipigon, Ontario.
- Lionel Pretoria Conacher b. 1902 first elected in 1949 as Liberal member for Trinity, Ontario.
- Joseph Lawrence Condon b. 1936 first elected in 1974 as Liberal member for Middlesex—London—Lambton, Ontario.
- Frederick Tennyson Congdon b. 1858 first elected in 1908 as Liberal member for Yukon, Yukon.
- James Conmee b. 1848 first elected in 1904 as Liberal member for Thunder Bay and Rainy River, Ontario.
- Charles Connell b. 1810 first elected in 1867 as Liberal member for Carleton, New Brunswick.
- George Heber Connell b. 1836 first elected in 1878 as Independent member for Carleton, New Brunswick.
- Paul Connors first elected in 2025 as Liberal member for Avalon, Newfoundland and Labrador
- Charles Henry Cook b. 1926 first elected in 1979 as Progressive Conservative member for North Vancouver—Burnaby, British Columbia.
- Herman Henry Cook b. 1837 first elected in 1872 as Liberal member for Simcoe North, Ontario.
- Jean-Paul Cook b. 1927 first elected in 1962 as Social Credit member for Montmagny—l'Islet, Quebec.
- Albert Glen Cooper b. 1952 first elected in 1980 as Progressive Conservative member for Peace River, Alberta.
- Clarence Owen Cooper b. 1899 first elected in 1958 as Progressive Conservative member for Rosetown—Biggar, Saskatchewan.
- George Thomas Jendery Cooper b. 1941 first elected in 1979 as Progressive Conservative member for Halifax, Nova Scotia.
- Michael Cooper b. 1984 first elected in 2015 as Conservative member for St. Albert—Edmonton, Alberta.
- Richard Clive Cooper b. 1881 first elected in 1917 as Unionist member for Vancouver South, British Columbia.
- George Gibson Coote b. 1880 first elected in 1921 as Progressive member for Macleod, Alberta.
- Albert James Smith Copp b. 1866 first elected in 1896 as Liberal member for Digby, Nova Scotia.
- Arthur Bliss Copp b. 1870 first elected in 1915 as Liberal member for Westmorland, New Brunswick.
- Sheila Maureen Copps b. 1952 first elected in 1984 as Liberal member for Hamilton East, Ontario.

== Cor–Cot ==
- Jean Corbeil b. 1934 first elected in 1988 as Progressive Conservative member for Anjou—Rivière-des-Prairies, Quebec.
- Robert Alfred Corbett b. 1938 first elected in 1978 as Progressive Conservative member for Fundy—Royal, New Brunswick.
- Eymard Georges Corbin b. 1934 first elected in 1968 as Liberal member for Madawaska—Victoria, New Brunswick.
- Gordon Edward Corbould b. 1847 first elected in 1890 as Conservative member for New Westminster, British Columbia.
- Henry Corby b. 1851 first elected in 1888 as Conservative member for Hastings West, Ontario.
- Ellis Hopkins Corman b. 1894 first elected in 1940 as Liberal member for Wentworth, Ontario.
- Maxime Cormier b. 1878 first elected in 1930 as Conservative member for Restigouche—Madawaska, New Brunswick.
- Serge Cormier b. 1974 first elected in 2015 as Liberal member for Acadie—Bathurst, New Brunswick.
- Léopold Corriveau b. 1926 first elected in 1970 as Liberal member for Frontenac, Quebec.
- James Neilson Corry b. 1895 first elected in 1949 as Liberal member for Perth, Ontario.
- Paul James Cosgrove b. 1934 first elected in 1980 as Liberal member for York—Scarborough, Ontario.
- Jennifer Cossitt b. 1948 first elected in 1982 as Progressive Conservative member for Leeds—Grenville, Ontario.
- Thomas Charles Cossitt b. 1927 first elected in 1972 as Progressive Conservative member for Leeds, Ontario.
- John Costigan b. 1835 first elected in 1867 as Liberal-Conservative member for Victoria, New Brunswick.
- Alcide Côté b. 1903 first elected in 1945 as Liberal member for Saint-Jean—Iberville—Napierville, Quebec.
- Antoine-Philéas Côté b. 1903 first elected in 1945 as Independent Liberal member for Matapédia—Matane, Quebec.
- Clément M. Côté b. 1940 first elected in 1984 as Progressive Conservative member for Lac-Saint-Jean, Quebec.
- Eva Lachance Côté b. 1934 first elected in 1980 as Liberal member for Rimouski, Quebec.
- Florian Côté b. 1929 first elected in 1966 as Liberal member for Nicolet—Yamaska, Quebec.
- Gustave Côté b. 1913 first elected in 1965 as Liberal member for Dorchester, Quebec.
- Guy Côté b. 1965 first elected in 2004 as Bloc Québécois member for Portneuf, Quebec.
- Joseph Julien Jean-Pierre Côté b. 1926 first elected in 1963 as Liberal member for Longueuil, Quebec.
- Maurice Côté b. 1917 first elected in 1962 as Social Credit member for Chicoutimi, Quebec.
- Michel Côté b. 1942 first elected in 1984 as Progressive Conservative member for Langelier, Quebec.
- Paul-Émile Côté b. 1909 first elected in 1940 as Liberal member for Verdun, Quebec.
- Pierre-Émile Côté b. 1887 first elected in 1937 as Liberal member for Bonaventure, Quebec.
- Raymond Côté b. 1967 first elected in 2011 as New Democratic Party member for Beauport—Limoilou, Quebec.
- Yvon Côté b. 1939 first elected in 1988 as Progressive Conservative member for Richmond—Wolfe, Quebec.
- Michael Coteau b. 1972 first elected in 2021 as Liberal member for Don Valley East, Ontario.
- Irwin Cotler b. 1940 first elected in 1999 as Liberal member for Mount Royal, Quebec.
- Ira Delbert Cotnam b. 1883 first elected in 1925 as Conservative member for Renfrew North, Ontario.

== Cou–Coy ==
- Timothy Coughlin b. 1834 first elected in 1878 as Liberal-Conservative member for Middlesex North, Ontario.
- Charles Jérémie Coulombe b. 1846 first elected in 1887 as Conservative member for Maskinongé, Quebec.
- Sixte Coupal dit la Reine b. 1825 first elected in 1867 as Liberal member for Napierville, Quebec.
- Gérard Cournoyer b. 1912 first elected in 1946 as Liberal member for Richelieu—Verchères, Quebec.
- Michel Charles Joseph Coursol b. 1819 first elected in 1878 as Conservative member for Montreal East, Quebec.
- Henri Courtemanche b. 1916 first elected in 1949 as Progressive Conservative member for Labelle, Quebec.
- René Cousineau b. 1930 first elected in 1979 as Liberal member for Gatineau, Quebec.
- Clément Couture b. 1939 first elected in 1988 as Progressive Conservative member for Saint-Jean, Quebec.
- Paul Couture b. 1833 first elected in 1887 as Independent member for Chicoutimi—Saguenay, Quebec.
- Donald James Cowan b. 1883 first elected in 1926 as Conservative member for Port Arthur—Thunder Bay, Ontario.
- George Henry Cowan b. 1858 first elected in 1908 as Conservative member for Vancouver City, British Columbia.
- Mahlon K. Cowan b. 1863 first elected in 1896 as Liberal member for Essex South, Ontario.
- Ralph Cowan b. 1902 first elected in 1962 as Liberal member for York—Humber, Ontario.
- Walter Davy Cowan b. 1865 first elected in 1917 as Unionist member for Regina, Saskatchewan.
- Marlene Cowling b. 1941 first elected in 1993 as Liberal member for Dauphin—Swan River, Manitoba.
- Charles Delmer Coyle b. 1887 first elected in 1945 as Progressive Conservative member for Elgin, Ontario.

== Cr ==
- Thomas Dixon Craig b. 1842 first elected in 1891 as Independent Conservative member for Durham East, Ontario.
- James Crawford b. 1816 first elected in 1867 as Conservative member for Brockville, Ontario.
- John Crawford b. 1856 first elected in 1904 as Liberal member for Portage la Prairie, Manitoba.
- John Willoughby Crawford b. 1817 first elected in 1867 as Conservative member for Leeds South, Ontario.
- Rex Crawford b. 1932 first elected in 1988 as Liberal member for Kent, Ontario.
- William Lawrence Marven Creaghan b. 1922 first elected in 1958 as Progressive Conservative member for Westmorland, New Brunswick.
- Thomas Alexander Crerar b. 1876 first elected in 1917 as Liberal member for Marquette, Manitoba.
- Leon Crestohl b. 1900 first elected in 1950 as Liberal member for Cartier, Quebec.
- Joseph-Alphida Crête b. 1890 first elected in 1935 as Liberal member for St-Maurice—Laflèche, Quebec.
- Paul Crête b. 1953 first elected in 1993 as Bloc Québécois member for Kamouraska—Rivière-du-Loup, Quebec.
- Joan Crockatt b. 1955 first elected in 2012 as Conservative member for Calgary Centre, Alberta.
- Oswald Smith Crocket b. 1868 first elected in 1904 as Conservative member for York, New Brunswick.
- Patrick Dermott Crofton b. 1935 first elected in 1984 as Progressive Conservative member for Esquimalt—Saanich, British Columbia.
- William Joseph Croke b. 1840 first elected in 1867 as Anti-Confederate member for Richmond, Nova Scotia.
- David Arnold Croll b. 1900 first elected in 1945 as Liberal member for Spadina, Ontario.
- Bonnie Crombie b. 1950 first elected in 2008 as Liberal member for Mississauga—Streetsville, Ontario.
- David Edward Crombie b. 1936 first elected in 1978 as Progressive Conservative member for Rosedale, Ontario.
- Frederick Robert Cromwell b. 1872 first elected in 1911 as Conservative member for Compton, Quebec.
- Hume Blake Cronyn b. 1864 first elected in 1917 as Unionist member for London, Ontario.
- John Carnell Crosbie b. 1931 first elected in 1976 as Progressive Conservative member for St. John's West, Newfoundland and Labrador.
- Adam Brown Crosby b. 1859 first elected in 1908 as Conservative member for Halifax, Nova Scotia.
- Howard Edward Crosby b. 1933 first elected in 1978 as Progressive Conservative member for Halifax—East Hants, Nova Scotia.
- Charles Wilson Cross b. 1872 first elected in 1925 as Liberal member for Athabaska, Alberta.
- Guy F. Crossman b. 1915 first elected in 1962 as Liberal member for Kent, New Brunswick.
- Thomas Wilson Crothers b. 1850 first elected in 1908 as Conservative member for Elgin West, Ontario.
- Lloyd Roseville Crouse b. 1918 first elected in 1957 as Progressive Conservative member for Queens—Lunenburg, Nova Scotia.
- Darius Crouter b. 1827 first elected in 1881 as Independent Liberal member for Northumberland East, Ontario.
- Jean Crowder b. 1952 first elected in 2004 as New Democratic Party member for Nanaimo—Cowichan, British Columbia.
- Sanford Johnston Crowe b. 1868 first elected in 1917 as Liberal member for Burrard, British Columbia.
- George Cruickshank b. 1897 first elected in 1940 as Liberal member for Fraser Valley, British Columbia.
- Robert Cruise b. 1868 first elected in 1911 as Liberal member for Dauphin, Manitoba.

== Cu ==
- Harold William Culbert b. 1944 first elected in 1993 as Liberal member for Carleton—Charlotte, New Brunswick.
- John Culbert b. 1847 first elected in 1900 as Conservative member for Brockville, Ontario.
- Jack Sydney George Cullen b. 1927 first elected in 1968 as Liberal member for Sarnia, Ontario.
- Nathan Cullen b. 1972 first elected in 2004 as New Democratic Party member for Skeena—Bulkley Valley, British Columbia.
- Roy Cullen b. 1944 first elected in 1996 as Liberal member for Etobicoke North, Ontario.
- Arthur Culligan b. 1879 first elected in 1925 as Conservative member for Restigouche—Madawaska, New Brunswick.
- Frederick William Cumberland b. 1821 first elected in 1871 as Conservative member for Algoma, Ontario.
- James Cumming b. 1961 first elected in 2019 as Conservative member for Edmonton Centre, Alberta.
- John Martin Cummins b. 1942 first elected in 1993 as Reform member for Delta, British Columbia.
- James Cunningham b. 1834 first elected in 1874 as Liberal member for New Westminster, British Columbia.
- Robert Cunningham b. 1836 first elected in 1872 as Liberal member for Marquette, Manitoba.
- Douglas Cunnington b. 1885 first elected in 1939 as Conservative member for Calgary West, Alberta.
- John Joseph Curran b. 1842 first elected in 1882 as Conservative member for Montreal Centre, Quebec.
- John Allister Currie b. 1868 first elected in 1908 as Conservative member for Simcoe North, Ontario.
- Morley Currie b. 1869 first elected in 1908 as Liberal member for Prince Edward, Ontario.
- Joseph Merrill Currier b. 1820 first elected in 1867 as Liberal-Conservative member for Ottawa (City of), Ontario.
- Lemuel Cushing, Jr. b. 1842 first elected in 1874 as Liberal member for Argenteuil, Quebec.
- Edward Octavian Cuthbert b. 1826 first elected in 1875 as Conservative member for Berthier, Quebec.
- Robert Barry Cutler b. 1810 first elected in 1872 as Liberal member for Kent, New Brunswick.
- Rodger Cuzner b. 1955 first elected in 2000 as Liberal member for Bras d'Or—Cape Breton, Nova Scotia.

== Cy ==
- Alexandre Cyr b. 1922 first elected in 1963 as Liberal member for Gaspé, Quebec.
- Joseph Ernest Cyr b. 1854 first elected in 1904 as Liberal member for Provencher, Manitoba.
