= George L. White =

Former Canadian politician

Member of the Legislative Assembly of New Brunswick
- In office 1912–1920 Serving with Benjamin F. Smith, William S. Sutton, James Kidd Flemming, Donald Munro
- Constituency: Carleton

Personal details
- Born: March 10, 1858 Queens County, New Brunswick
- Died: April 25, 1917 (aged 59) New Brunswick
- Party: Conservative Party of New Brunswick
- Spouse: Alice Wilmot Balloch (m. 1887)
- Children: 7
- Occupation: General merchant

George Leverett White (March 10, 1858 – April 25, 1917) was a Canadian politician. He served in the Legislative Assembly of New Brunswick as a member from Carleton County.
