= James Kidd Flemming =

Canadian politician

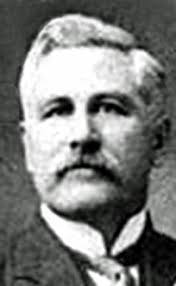

14th Premier of New Brunswick
- In office October 16, 1911 – December 6, 1914
- Monarch: George V
- Lieutenant Governor: Lemuel John Tweedie; Josiah Wood
- Preceded by: J. Douglas Hazen
- Succeeded by: George J. Clarke

Member of Parliament for Victoria—Carleton
- In office October 29, 1925 – February 10, 1927
- Preceded by: Thomas W. Caldwell
- Succeeded by: Albion R. Foster

MLA for Carleton
- In office January 14, 1900 – December 6, 1914 Serving with Hugh H. McCain, Benjamin Franklin Smith, George W. Upham, George L. White, Stephen B. Appleby, Wendell P. Jones, Donald Munro
- Preceded by: Charles L. Smith
- Succeeded by: Benjamin Franklin Smith

Personal details
- Born: April 27, 1868 Lower Woodstock, New Brunswick, Canada
- Died: February 10, 1927 (aged 58) McKenzie Corner, New Brunswick, Canada
- Party: Conservative
- Spouse: Sarah Helena Flemming (m. 1890)
- Relations: Hugh John Flemming (son)
- Children: 3 sons, 2 daughters
- Occupation: Businessman, lumberman, teacher
- Profession: Politician

James Kidd Flemming (April 27, 1868 – February 10, 1927) was a businessman and politician in New Brunswick, Canada.

Flemming was a school teacher and lumberman before entering politics and serving as Provincial Secretary-Treasurer from 1908 to 1911 and Minister of Lands and Mines from 1911 to 1914. He succeeded Douglas Hazen as the Premier of New Brunswick in 1911. In the June 1912 general election, Flemming led his provincial party to the biggest electoral victory in its history. In addition to two independent Conservative seats, the Conservative Party captured 42 of the province's 46 seats.

Under Flemming, the French language was used for the first time in the Legislative Assembly of New Brunswick.

In 1914, Premier Flemming was forced to resign after charges of fundraising irregularities against him were made public by a powerful group of back-room Liberals known as the "Dark Lantern Brigade" led by party organizers Peter Veniot and Edward S. Carter plus lawyer and Federal Member of Parliament, Frank Carvell.

Nevertheless, Flemming remained popular and won a seat in the House of Commons of Canada in the 1925 federal election and again in the 1926 election.

He was president and director of the Flemming and Gibson lumber business in Juniper, New Brunswick. His son, Hugh John Flemming took over the business and too entered politics, serving as Premier of New Brunswick from 1952 to 1960.

James Kidd Flemming suffered from poor health for many of his adult years and died in 1927 at age fifty-eight. He and his wife Helena are buried in the family plot at the Methodist Church Cemetery in Woodstock, New Brunswick.
