= Stephen Burpee Appleby =

Canadian politician and lawyer

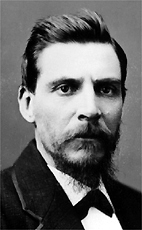

Member of the Legislative Assembly of New Brunswick for Carleton County
- In office 1900–1903
- Preceded by: Frank Broadstreet Carvell
- Succeeded by: ^{1}

Member of Parliament for Carleton
- In office 1874–1878
- Preceded by: Charles Connell
- Succeeded by: George Heber Connell

Personal details
- Born: 1830 Florenceville, New Brunswick, Canada
- Died: December 10, 1903 (aged 72–73)
- Party: Liberal
- Spouse: Harriet Elizabeth Estey
- Profession: lawyer

Stephen Burpee Appleby (1830 – December 10, 1903) was a Canadian politician and lawyer.

Appleby was born in Florenceville, New Brunswick. In 1864, Appleby married Harriet Elizabeth Estey. He was called to the New Brunswick bar in 1869. Appleby practised law in Woodstock, New Brunswick. He was first elected to the House of Commons of Canada as a member of the Liberal Party in an 1873 by-election held in the riding of Carleton after the death of Charles Connell. Appleby was reelected in the 1874 general election. He was defeated in the 1878 election by Connell's son George Heber Connell.

In 1900, Appleby returned to politics as a member of the Legislative Assembly of New Brunswick.

== Electoral record ==
Canadian federal by-election, 18 September 1873
Party	Candidate	Votes
Liberal	Stephen Burpee Appleby	acclaimed

By-election on Charles Connell's death, June 28, 1873.

1874 Canadian federal election: Carleton, New Brunswick
Party	Candidate	Votes
Liberal	Stephen Burpee Appleby	acclaimed
Total valid votes		–
Source: Library of Parliament

1878 Canadian federal election: Carleton, New Brunswick
Party	Candidate	Votes	%	±%
Independent	George Heber Connell	1,766	54.96	–
Liberal	Stephen Burpee Appleby	1,447	45.04	–
Total valid votes		3,213	–	
Source: Library of Parliament

== Notes ==
1. Carleton County sent three representatives to the Legislative Assembly during Appleby's tenure. In 1903, Frank Smith and Wendell P. Jones succeeded Appleby and Hugh H. McCain. The third member, James Kidd Flemming, was reelected.
