= By-elections to the 2nd Canadian Parliament =

By-elections to the 2nd Canadian Parliament were held to elect members of the House of Commons of Canada between the 1872 federal election and the 1874 federal election. The Conservative Party of Canada led a majority government for most of the 2nd Canadian Parliament.

The list includes Ministerial by-elections which occurred due to the requirement that Members of Parliament recontested their seats upon being appointed to Cabinet. These by-elections were almost always uncontested. This requirement was abolished in 1931.

By-election	Date	Incumbent	Party	Winner	Party	Cause	Retained
Victoria	December 20, 1873	William Ross	Liberal	William Ross	Liberal	Recontested upon appointment as Minister of Militia	Yes
Antigonish	December 20, 1873	Hugh McDonald	Liberal-Conservative	Angus McIsaac	Liberal	Appointed a Judge of the Supreme Court of Nova Scotia	No
West Toronto	December 18, 1873	John Willoughby Crawford	Conservative	Thomas Moss	Liberal	Incumbent's death	No
Bruce South	December 14, 1873	Edward Blake	Liberal	Edward Blake	Liberal	Recontested upon appointment as Minister without portfolio	Yes
Shelburne	December 9, 1873	Thomas Coffin	Liberal-Conservative	Thomas Coffin	Liberal	Recontested upon appointment as Receiver-General of Canada	No
Lennox	December 3, 1873	Richard John Cartwright	Liberal	Richard John Cartwright	Liberal	Recontested upon appointment as Minister of Finance	Yes
Queen's County	December 3, 1873	David Laird	Liberal	David Laird	Liberal	Recontested upon appointment as Minister of the Interior	Yes
City of St. John	December 1, 1873	Samuel Leonard Tilley	Liberal-Conservative	Jeremiah Smith Boies De Veber	Liberal	Appointed Lieutenant-Governor of New Brunswick	No
City and County of St. John	December 1, 1873	Isaac Burpee	Liberal	Isaac Burpee	Liberal	Recontested upon appointment as Minister of Customs	Yes
Westmorland	November 28, 1873	Albert James Smith	Liberal	Albert James Smith	Liberal	Recontested upon appointment as Minister of Marine and Fisheries	Yes
Bellechasse	November 27, 1873	Télesphore Fournier	Liberal	Télesphore Fournier	Liberal	Recontested upon appointment as Minister of Inland Revenue	Yes
Napierville	November 27, 1873	Antoine-Aimé Dorion	Liberal	Antoine-Aimé Dorion	Liberal	Recontested upon appointment as Minister of Justice	Yes
Glengarry	November 26, 1873	Donald Alexander Macdonald	Liberal	Donald Alexander Macdonald	Liberal	Recontested upon appointment as Postmaster-General	Yes
Lambton	November 25, 1873	Alexander Mackenzie	Liberal	Alexander Mackenzie	Liberal	Recontested upon appointment as Prime Minister and Minister of Public Works	Yes
Laval	October 28, 1873	Joseph-Hyacinthe Bellerose	Conservative	Joseph-Aldric Ouimet	Liberal-Conservative	Called to the Senate	Yes
Provencher	October 13, 1873	George-Étienne Cartier	Liberal-Conservative	Louis Riel	Independent	Incumbent's death	No
Prince County	September 29, 1873	New seat		James Colledge Pope and James Yeo	Conservative and Liberal	Held as a result of Prince Edward Island joining Confederation. Elected 2 MPs.	NA
Queen's County	September 29, 1873	New seat		David Laird and Peter Sinclair	Liberal	Held as a result of Prince Edward Island joining Confederation. Elected 2 MPs.	NA
King's County	September 29, 1873	New Seat		Daniel Davies and Augustine Colin Macdonald	Conservative and Liberal-Conservative	Held as a result of Prince Edward Island joining Confederation. Elected 2 MPs.	NA
Carleton	September 18, 1873	Charles Connell	Liberal	Stephen Burpee Appleby	Liberal	Incumbent's death	Yes
Antigonish	July 7, 1873	Hugh McDonald	Liberal-Conservative	Hugh McDonald	Liberal-Conservative	Recontested upon appointment as President of the Privy Council	Yes
Ontario South	July 7, 1873	Thomas Nicholson Gibbs	Liberal-Conservative	Thomas Nicholson Gibbs	Liberal-Conservative	Recontested upon appointment as Secretary of State for the Provinces and Superintendent General of Indian Affairs	Yes
Hants	July 5, 1873	Joseph Howe	Liberal-Conservative	Monson Henry Goudge	Liberal	Appointed Lieutenant Governor of Nova Scotia.	No
Durham West	April 10, 1873	Edward Blake	Liberal	Edmund Burke Wood	Liberal	Chose to sit for Bruce South.	Yes
Quebec County	March 28, 1873	Pierre-Joseph-Olivier Chauveau	Conservative	Adolphe-Philippe Caron	Conservative	Called to the Senate	Yes
Bonaventure	February 15, 1873	Théodore Robitaille	Conservative	Théodore Robitaille	Conservative	Recontested upon appointment as Receiver-General	Yes
Welland	November 23, 1872	Thomas Clark Street	Conservative	William Alexander Thomson	Liberal	Incumbent's death	No

== See also ==
- List of federal by-elections in Canada

== Sources ==
- Parliament of Canada–Elected in By-Elections
