= Henry A. Connell =

Canadian politician

MLA for Carleton County
- In office 1892–1895
- Preceded by: ^{1}
- Succeeded by: Marcus C. Atkinson

Mayor of Woodstock, New Brunswick
- In office 1885–1890
- Preceded by: Randolph K. Jones
- Succeeded by: Allan Dibblee

Personal details
- Born: October 24, 1834 Woodstock, New Brunswick
- Died: May 28, 1917 (aged 82)
- Resting place: Christ Church Cemetery; Woodstock, New Brunswick
- Spouse(s): Harriet Ketchum (m. 1845; died 1873) Rebecca Barnes (m. 1874; died 1882) Ellen MacDonald (died 1903)
- Relations: Charles Connell (uncle)
- Occupation: Machinist; Steamboat captain Engineer; Businessman; Politician

Henry Augustus Connell was a Canadian businessman and politician who was Mayor of Woodstock, New Brunswick, and a member of the Legislative Assembly of New Brunswick.

== Early life ==
Connell was born on October 24, 1834, in Woodstock, New Brunswick, to Isabella Harding and Henry Farmer Connell. At the age of 14, Connell left home to work at steam driving in northern Maine. He later moved to Bangor, Maine, to train as a machinist. Connell returned to British North America and worked as an engineer on the steamship John Waring. He was unhappy with the drudgery and small pay of his job and decided to leave the county to find employment. Connell would work in Florida, Brazil, Argentina, Uruguay, and China. While in South America, he managed a fleet of 55 steamers.

== Business career ==
In 1870 he returned to Woodstock. He and his brothers, Charles and William, invested in the Vulcan Foundry, which became Connell Bros. Henry was the head and manager of the company. The company manufactured shingle machines, mill machinery, threshers, horse-powered sawing machines, pulpers, stoves, furnaces, steel plows, harrows, cultivators, and other agricultural implements. In 1904, Connell sold the company, which retained the Connell Bros. name.

Connell was also manager of the Tobique Valley Mining and Manufacturing Company.

== Politics ==
Connell served as Mayor of Woodstock from 1885 to 1890. From October 22, 1892, to January 17, 1895, he was a member of the Legislative Assembly of New Brunswick for Carleton County. He was a minister without portfolio in the government of Andrew George Blair from 1892 to 1893.

Connell also served on the Woodstock School Board and was the Woodstock Electric Light Company's superintendent, manager, and purchasing agent.

== Personal life and death ==
Connell married three times. In 1845 he married Harriet Ketchum. She died in 1873. The couple had one child who died in infancy. He married his second wife, Rebecca Barnes, on July 15, 1874, in Saint John, New Brunswick. The marriage resulted in one child, Augusta Gertrude. Barnes died in 1882. His third wife, Ellen MacDonald, died in 1903. They had no children. His uncle Charles Connell was also a politician.

Connell died on May 28, 1917.

== Notes ==
1. Carleton County sent two representatives to the Legislative Assembly during Connell's tenure. In 1892 Connell and Allan Dibblee succeeded George R. Ketchum and Marcus C. Atkinson.
