= 1932 New Brunswick Liberal Association leadership election =

- Date: 1932
- Convention: Fredericton, New Brunswick
- Resigning leader: Wendell P. Jones
- Won by: Allison Dysart
- Ballots: 1
- Candidates: 2

The New Brunswick Liberal Association held a leadership election on October 5, 1932, in Fredericton, New Brunswick, to elect a new leader for the party. The position was left vacant following the resignation of former leader Wendell P. Jones some time after the 1930 general election.

Two candidates were selected during the leadership election. Allison Dysart won the election, against sole contender John B. McNair.

== Leadership election ==
The leadership election for the party took place on October 5, 1932. It was held at the Opera House in Fredericton, and the two contenders for leadership were Allison Dysart and John B. McNair. According to The Daily Mail, the vote was made among nearly 600 delegates. Dysart was elected as the leader of the party. The Daily Gleaner reported that figures had not been officially released, though The Daily Mail reported that it was "understood" that out of about 500 votes, McNair received 90. Liberal paper The Moncton Transcript also reported that Dysart received 459 votes while McNair received 97.
