= Jack Patterson (Canadian politician) =

Canadian politician

Member of Parliament for Victoria—Carleton
- In office October 1935 – January 1940
- Preceded by: Benjamin Franklin Smith
- Succeeded by: Heber Harold Hatfield

Personal details
- Born: James Edward Patterson; 2 July 1884 Salisbury, New Brunswick
- Died: 21 July 1964 (aged 80)
- Party: Liberal
- Spouse(s): Marion Taylor m. 20 December 1910
- Profession: civil engineer, farmer, land surveyor

James Edward Jack Patterson (2 July 1884 – 21 July 1964) was a Liberal party member of the House of Commons of Canada. He was born in Salisbury, New Brunswick and became a civil engineer, farmer and land surveyor.

Patterson attended the University of New Brunswick, earning a Bachelor of Science degree.

Patterson was a councillor for Carleton County, New Brunswick from 1925 to 1935.

He was first elected to Parliament at the Victoria—Carleton riding in the 1935 general election. After completing one term, the 18th Canadian Parliament, Patterson left the House of Commons and did not seek another term in the 1940 election.
