= Greg Thompson =

Canadian politician (1947–2019)

The Honourable Greg Thompson PC
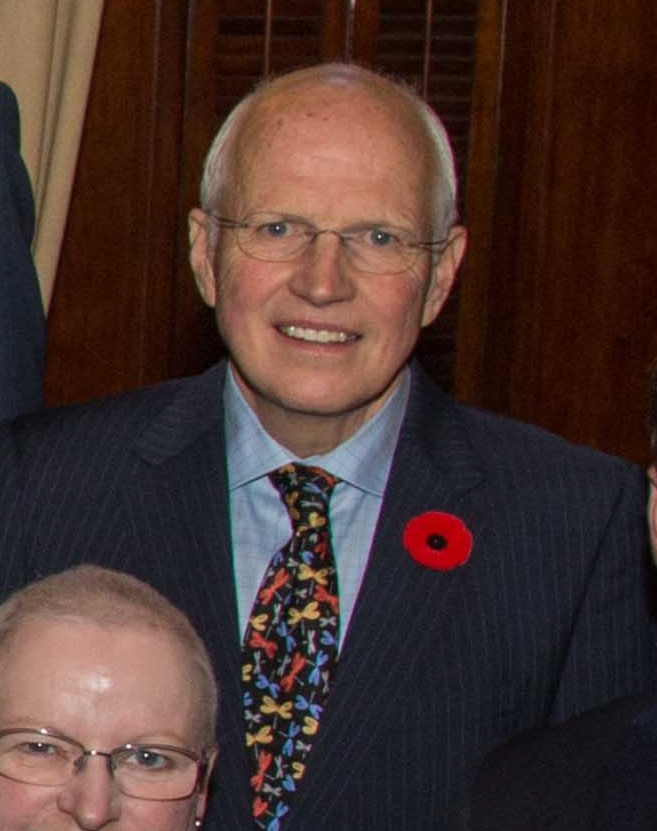
- Thompson in 2018

Minister of Intergovernmental Affairs of New Brunswick
- In office November 9, 2018 – September 10, 2019
- Premier: Blaine Higgs
- Preceded by: Francine Landry
- Succeeded by: Blaine Higgs

Member of the New Brunswick Legislative Assembly for Saint Croix
- In office September 24, 2018 – September 10, 2019
- Preceded by: John Ames

Minister of Veterans Affairs
- In office February 6, 2006 – January 16, 2010
- Prime Minister: Stephen Harper
- Preceded by: Albina Guarnieri
- Succeeded by: Jean-Pierre Blackburn

Member of Parliament for New Brunswick Southwest
- In office June 2, 1997 – May 2, 2011
- Preceded by: District created
- Succeeded by: John Williamson

Member of Parliament for Carleton—Charlotte
- In office November 21, 1988 – October 25, 1993
- Preceded by: Fred McCain
- Succeeded by: Harold Culbert

Personal details
- Born: Greg Francis Thompson; March 28, 1947 St. Stephen, New Brunswick
- Died: September 10, 2019 (aged 72) Saint John, New Brunswick
- Party: Progressive Conservative (2018 - 2019)
- Other political affiliations: Progressive Conservative (before 2003); Conservative (2003-2011)
- Spouse: Linda Thompson

Gregory Francis Thompson, PC (March 28, 1947 – September 10, 2019) was a Canadian politician who served six terms as a Member of Parliament (MP), and for one term he represented the district of Saint Croix in the New Brunswick Legislative Assembly, from 2018 until 2019.

== Political career ==
Thompson was a high school history teacher at Fundy High School from 1975 to 1980.

Thompson, a high school teacher, a businessman and financial planner was first elected to the House of Commons of Canada in the 1988 Canadian federal election as a member of the Progressive Conservative Party of Canada. He was elected in the riding of Carleton—Charlotte. His bid for re-election in the 1993 Canadian federal election was unsuccessful and he was defeated by Harold Culbert of the Liberal Party of Canada by fewer than 1,000 votes.

Thompson however ran again in the next election and was re-elected in the riding of Charlotte, where he defeated Culbert. Thompson was re-elected in the 2000 Canadian federal election in the riding of New Brunswick Southwest and again the 2004 Canadian federal election in the riding of St. Croix—Belleisle. Shortly before the 2004 election, he joined the new Conservative Party of Canada. He was re-elected in the 2006 federal election. In the 2008 federal election he was elected for a sixth term in the riding of New Brunswick Southwest by garnering over 58% of the vote.

During his time in parliament, he has served as the critic of Human Resources Development, the Treasury Board, Regional Development, Health, and Public Accounts, as well as critic of the Atlantic Canada Opportunities Agency. On February 6, 2006, he was appointed Minister of Veterans Affairs in Stephen Harper's Cabinet. In April 2007, he and Harper told the press in Kitchener, Ontario that a Veterans' Bill of Rights would come into effect soon and there would be a new ombudsman for veterans along with it.

Thompson resigned from his position in Cabinet on January 16, 2010, because years of travel had worn him down and he wasn't looking forward to making a trip to New Zealand due to the length and time he had to invest in the trip. He also announced he would not run in the 2011 federal election.

=== Veterans Affairs privacy issues ===
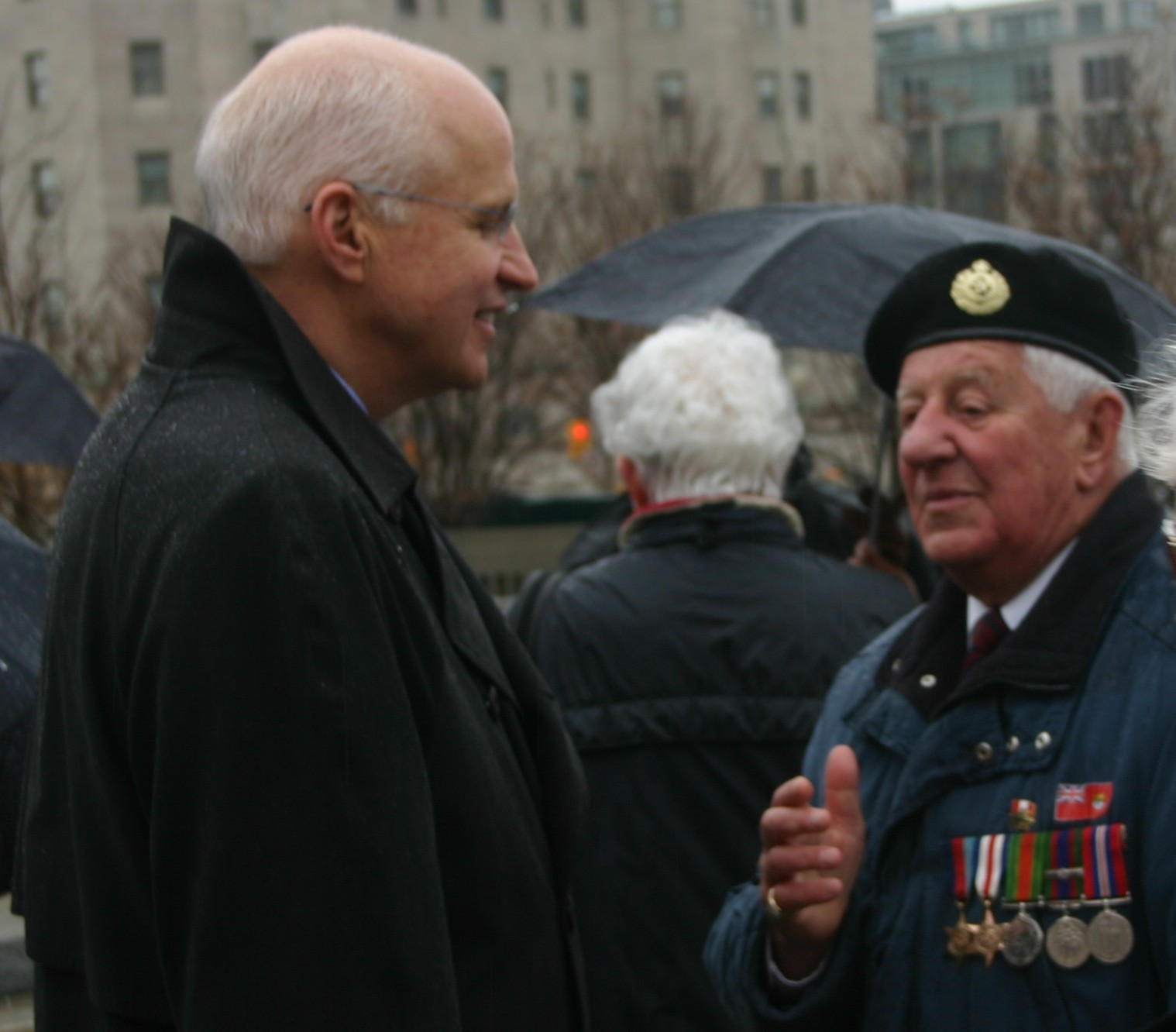
Thompson speaking with veterans at the ceremony marking the 89th Anniversary of the Battle of Vimy Ridge

In October 2010, Canada's Privacy Commissioner Jennifer Stoddart uncovered evidence that widespread privacy abuses had been occurring at Veterans Affairs Canada. Among the cases where privacy issues were investigated is that in which highly personal information of an outspoken critic of Veterans Affairs, including confidential medical and financial information, was included in briefing notes prepared for then-minister Greg Thompson.

=== Provincial politics ===
In 2018 Thompson ran provincially under the Progressive Conservatives in the riding of Saint Croix and won. He served as Minister of Intergovernmental Affairs until his death in September 2019.

== Electoral record ==
2018 New Brunswick general election: Saint Croix
Party	Candidate	Votes	%	±%
Progressive Conservative	Greg Thompson	3,249	39.21	+0.02
Liberal	John Ames	2,436	29.40	-12.34
People's Alliance	Joyce Wright	1,466	17.69	+11.74
Green	Donna Linton	1,047	12.63	+6.27
New Democratic	Jan Underhill	89	1.07	-5.69
Total valid votes		8,287	99.83	
Total rejected ballots		14	0.17	-0.15
Turnout		8,301	66.19	+7.22
Eligible voters		12,176		
Progressive Conservative gain from Liberal		Swing		+6.18

2008 Canadian federal election: New Brunswick Southwest
Party	Candidate	Votes	%	±%	Expenditures
Conservative	Greg Thompson	17,474	58.32	+3.52	$40,981.82
Liberal	Nancy MacIntosh	5,863	19.57	-7.22	$19,548.24
New Democratic	Andrew Graham	4,958	16.55	+0.92	$4,704.82
Green	Robert Wayne Boucher	1,667	5.56	+2.78	$33.90
Total valid votes/expense limit		29,962	100.0		$78,512
Total rejected, unmarked and declined ballots		180	0.60	-0.03	
Turnout		30,142	61.17	-5.62	
Eligible voters		49,273			
Conservative hold		Swing		+5.37	

2006 Canadian federal election: New Brunswick Southwest
Party	Candidate	Votes	%	±%	Expenditures
Conservative	Greg Thompson	18,155	54.80	+1.74	$32,170.17
Liberal	Stan Smith	8,877	26.79	-4.72	$21,541.46
New Democratic	Andrew Graham	5,178	15.63	+3.94	3,438.46
Green	Erik Millett	922	2.78	-0.34	$0.50
Total valid votes/expense limit		33,132	100.0		$73,312
Total rejected, unmarked and declined ballots		210	0.63		
Turnout		33,342	66.79		
Eligible voters		49,921			
Conservative hold		Swing		+3.23	

2004 Canadian federal election: New Brunswick Southwest
Party	Candidate	Votes	%	±%	Expenditures
Conservative	Greg Thompson	16,339	53.06	-14.48	$41,476.00
Liberal	Jim Dunlap	9,702	31.51	+3.25	$55,323.96
New Democratic	Patrick Webber	3,600	11.69	+7.49	$81.90
Green	Erik Millett	960	3.12	–	$797.55
Canadian Action	David Szemerda	194	0.63	–	none listed
Total valid votes/expense limit		30,795	100.0		$71,262
Total rejected, unmarked and declined ballots		216	0.70		
Turnout		31,011	62.23	-5.12	
Eligible voters		49,834			
Conservative notional gain from Progressive Conservative		Swing		-8.86	
Changes from 2000 are based on redistributed results. Change for the Conservative Party is based on the combined totals of the Progressive Conservative Party and the Canadian Alliance.

2000 Canadian federal election: New Brunswick Southwest
Party	Candidate	Votes	%	±%
Progressive Conservative	Greg Thompson	14,489	47.2	+2.3
Liberal	Winston Gamblin	8,442	27.5	+1.8
Alliance	John Erbs	6,562	21.4	+0.4
New Democratic	Habib Kilisli	1,173	3.8	-3.6
Total valid votes		30,666	100.0	

1997 Canadian federal election: New Brunswick Southwest
Party	Candidate	Votes	%
Progressive Conservative	Greg Thompson	14,533	44.9
Liberal	Harold Culbert	8,309	25.7
Reform	Eric Banks	6,814	21.0
New Democratic	Rob Rainer	2,397	7.4
Natural Law	Thomas Mitchell	280	0.9
Total valid votes		32,333	100.0

1993 Canadian federal election: Carleton—Charlotte
Party	Candidate	Votes	%	±%
Liberal	Harold Culbert	13,970	43.1	+1.5
Progressive Conservative	Greg Thompson	12,157	40.6	-6.6
Reform	Greg Wyborn	3,827	11.8	
New Democratic	Bill Barteau	1,016	3.1	-4.6
National	Richard Shelley	431	1.3	
Total valid votes		32,401		

1988 Canadian federal election: Carleton—Charlotte
Party	Candidate	Votes	%	±%
Progressive Conservative	Greg Thompson	16,026	47.2	-14.6
Liberal	Harold Culbert	14,116	41.6	+17.6
New Democratic	Ben Kilfoil	2,596	7.7	-6.5
Confederation of Regions	Robert Storr	1,183	3.5	
Total valid votes		33,921		

== See also ==
- Veterans Affairs Canada
