= Randolph K. Jones =

Canadian politician

Mayor of Woodstock, New Brunswick
- In office 1880–1884
- Preceded by: Fred T. Bridges
- Succeeded by: Henry A. Connell

MLA for Carleton County
- In office 1874–1878
- Preceded by: ^{1}
- Succeeded by: George W. White

Personal details
- Born: October 19, 1840 Simonds Parish, Carleton County, New Brunswick
- Died: January 23, 1899 (aged 58) Woodstock, New Brunswick
- Resting place: Methodist Cemetery, Woodstock, New Brunswick
- Spouse: Gertrude Harriet or Harriet Gertrude Raymond
- Children: 7, including Wendell P. Jones
- Occupation: Lawyer; Politician

Randolph Ketchum Jones (October 19, 1840 – January 23, 1899) was a lawyer and political figure in New Brunswick. He represented Carleton County in the Legislative Assembly of New Brunswick from 1874 to 1878.

He was born in Simonds Parish, Carleton County, the son of James Jones and Eliza Shaw, both descended from United Empire Loyalists. Jones was educated in Woodstock and in Sackville. He studied law at Harvard Law School, was called to the bar in 1867 and set up practice in Woodstock. In 1861, he married Gertrude Harriet Raymond. They had seven children, one of whom, Wendell P. Jones, was also a politician. Jones served as secretary-treasurer for the county, as clerk in the circuit court and as mayor of Woodstock. He was also treasurer for Woodstock before he became mayor in 1880 after the death of Frederick T. Bridges.

== Notes ==
1. Carleton County sent two representatives to the Legislative Assembly during Jones' tenure. In 1874, Jones and John S. Leighton succeeded William Lindsay and George W. White.
