= 37th New Brunswick general election =

The 37th New Brunswick general election may refer to

- the 1930 New Brunswick general election, the 37th overall general election for New Brunswick, for the 37th New Brunswick Legislative Assembly, but considered the 17th general election for the Canadian province of New Brunswick, or
- the 2010 New Brunswick general election, the 57th overall general election for New Brunswick, for the 57th New Brunswick Legislative Assembly, but considered the 37th general election for the Canadian province of New Brunswick.
