= Frederick Harding Hale =

Canadian politician (1844–1912)

Member of the Canadian Parliament for Carleton
- In office 1887–1904
- Preceded by: David Irvine
- Succeeded by: Frank Broadstreet Carvell

Personal details
- Born: December 8, 1844 Northampton, New Brunswick
- Died: June 14, 1912 (aged 67)
- Party: Liberal-Conservative

Frederick Harding Hale (December 8, 1844 – June 14, 1912) was a Canadian lumber merchant and politician.

Born in Northampton, Carleton County, New Brunswick, the son of Martin Hale and Hulda Dickinson, Hale was involved in the manufacture and sale of all kinds of lumber at Northampton and Woodstock. He was elected to the House of Commons of Canada for the electoral district of Carleton in the 1887 federal election. A Liberal-Conservative, he was re-elected in 1896 and 1900. He was defeated in the 1904 election.

He died on June 14, 1912.

== Electoral record ==
1887 Canadian federal election: Carleton
Party	Candidate	Votes	%	±%
Liberal–Conservative	Frederick Harding Hale	2,362	65.52	–
Liberal	Donald McLeod Vince	1,243	34.48	-17.81
Total valid votes		3,605	–	
Source: Library of Parliament

1896 Canadian federal election: Carleton
Party	Candidate	Votes	%	±%
Liberal–Conservative	Frederick Harding Hale	2,667	54.12	+5.50
Liberal	Newton Ramsay Colter	2,261	45.88	-5.50
Total valid votes		4,928	–	
Source: Library of Parliament

1900 Canadian federal election: Carleton
Party	Candidate	Votes	%	±%
Liberal–Conservative	Frederick Harding Hale	2,714	52.46	-1.65
Liberal	Frank Broadstreet Carvell	2,459	47.54	+1.65
Total valid votes		5,173	–	
Source: Library of Parliament

1904 Canadian federal election: Carleton
Party	Candidate	Votes	%	±%
Liberal	Frank Broadstreet Carvell	2,662	52.71	+5.18
Liberal–Conservative	Frederick Harding Hale	2,388	47.29	-5.18
Total valid votes		5,050	–	
Source: Library of Parliament
