= Allan Dibblee =

Canadian politician

MLA for Carleton County
- In office 1892–1899
- Preceded by: ^{1}
- Succeeded by: Frank Broadstreet Carvell

Mayor of Woodstock, New Brunswick
- In office 1890–1891
- Preceded by: Henry A. Connell
- Succeeded by: William T. Drysdale

Personal details
- Born: October 20, 1856 Woodstock, New Brunswick
- Died: January 31, 1915 (aged 58)
- Party: Liberal-Conservative
- Spouse: Maria Ellegood
- Occupation: Hardware merchant Politician

John Thomas Allan Dibblee (October 20, 1856 – January 31, 1915) was a hardware merchant and political figure in New Brunswick, Canada. He represented Carleton County in the Legislative Assembly of New Brunswick from 1892 to 1899 as a Liberal-Conservative member.

He was born on October 20, 1856, in Woodstock, New Brunswick, to Ann Barker and William Fyler Dibblee. He was educated in Carleton County. Dibblee married Maria Ellegood. They had seven children. He served on the town council and was mayor of Woodstock in 1890 and 1891.

== Notes ==
1. Carleton County sent two representatives to the Legislative Assembly during Dibblee's tenure. In 1892, Dibblee and Henry A. Connell succeeded George R. Ketchum and Marcus C. Atkinson.
