= List of mayors of Woodstock, New Brunswick =

This is a list of mayors of Woodstock, New Brunswick

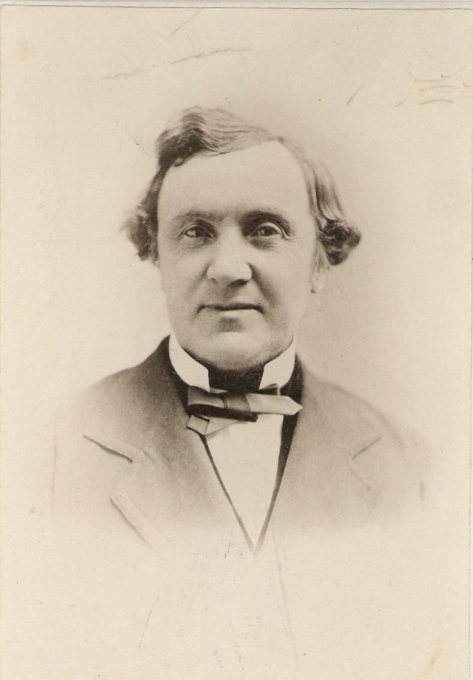
Lewis Peter Fisher, 1st mayor

#	Mayor	Term	Notes
1st	Lewis P. Fisher	1856–1880	
2nd	Fred T. Bridges	1880–1880	Died in office.
3rd	Randolph K. Jones	1880–1884	
4th	Henry A. Connell	1885–1890	
5th	Allan Dibblee	1890–1891	
6th	William T. Drysdale	1892–1893	
7th	Uriah R. Hanson	1894–1894	
8th	William S. Saunders	1895–1896	
9th	William Wallace Hay	1897–1898	
10th	Josiah R. Murphy	1899–1900	
11th	Wellington B. Belyea	1901–1903	
12th	John A. Lindsey	1904–1904	
13th	Albert E. Jones	1905–1905	
14th	Donald Munro	1906–1907	
15th	George E. Balmain	1908–1908	
16th	Newton Foster Thorne	1909–1909	Died in office.
17th	Albert E. Jones	1909–1910	
18th	T. C. L. Ketchum	1911–1912	
19th	Wendell P. Jones	1913–1914	
20th	William S. Sutton	1915–1916	
21st	Howard E. Burtt	1917–1918	
22nd	Thomas Nodden	1919–1920	
23rd	Edgar W. Mair	1921–1922	
24th	J. Rankin Brown	1923–1924	
25th	Wellington B. Belyea	1925–1926	
26th	Charles J. Jones	1926–1928	
27th	Grover C. Campbell	1929–1930	
28th	Alfred Page	1931–1932	
29th	Thomas Nodden	1933–1933	
30th	E. Raymond Jones	1934–1935	
31st	K. Lee Everett	1936–1937	
32nd	A. Roy Turner	1938–1940	
33rd	Aubrey Hetherington	1940–1941	
34th	E. Raymond Jones	1942–1942	
35th	Edgar A. Neal	1943–1945	
36th	Bert Maxwell	1946–1948	
37th	Frederick O. Creighton	1948–1950	
38th	Maurice H. Craig	1951–1956	
39th	Thomas L. Everett	1957–1958	
40th	Hugh M. Tait	1959–1962	
41st	Gerald E. Phillips	1962-1966	
42nd	Gerald A. Gallop	1966–1969	
43rd	Ronald W. Moffatt	1969–1977	
44th	Harry Deakin	1977–1980	
45th	Harold Culbert	1980–1992	
46th	Clara D. Moffatt	1992–1995	
47th	James W. Andow	1995–1999	
48th	Randy Leonard	1999–2004	
49th	Jeff Wright	2004–2008	
50th	Arthur Slipp	2008–2022	
51st	Trina Jones	2023–2026	
52nd	Jeff Wright	2026-present	

== See also ==
- List of people from New Brunswick
