= Albion Roudolph Foster =

Canadian politician (1875–1945)

Albion Foster

Member of Parliament for Victoria—Carleton
- In office June 1927 – July 1930
- Preceded by: James Kidd Flemming
- Succeeded by: Benjamin Franklin Smith

Personal details
- Born: Albion Roudolph Foster; 24 November 1875 Middle Simonds, New Brunswick, Canada
- Died: 6 February 1945 (aged 69)
- Party: Liberal
- Spouse(s): 1) Evelyn Campbell m. 1905; 2) Grace Smith Glidden m. 16 June 1926
- Profession: Farmer, police chief, sheriff

Albion Roudolph Foster (24 November 1875 – 6 February 1945) was a Canadian farmer, policeman and politician. Foster was a Liberal party member of the House of Commons of Canada. He was born in Middle Simonds, New Brunswick in Carleton County and became a farmer.

Foster attended schools at Middle Simonds. He was also active in law enforcement as a deputy sheriff for eight years, a high sheriff for a decade and for five years a police chief for the Transcontinenal Railway.

He was acclaimed to Parliament at the Victoria—Carleton riding in a by-election on 16 June 1927 after a previous unsuccessful campaign there in the 1926 federal election. After serving for the remainder of the 16th Canadian Parliament, Foster lost to Benjamin Franklin Smith of the Conservatives in the 1930 election.
