= James Hartley =

James Hartley may refer to:

- James Hartley (Canadian politician) (1888–1970), provincial politician from Alberta, Canada
- James Hartley (British politician) (1811–1886), British Conservative Party politician
- James R. Hartley (1833–1868), provincial politician from New Brunswick, Canada
- James Joseph Hartley (1858–1944), American prelate of the Roman Catholic Church
- Jimmy Hartley (1876–1913), Scottish footballer
- James Hartley (East India Company officer) (1745–1799), British officer in the service of the Indian Army
