= George W. Upham =

Former Canadian politician

Member of the Legislative Assembly of New Brunswick
- In office 1908–1912 Serving with James Kidd Flemming, Donald Munro
- Constituency: Carleton

Personal details
- Born: January 28, 1862 Woodstock, New Brunswick
- Died: July 14, 1923 (aged 61) Fredericton, New Brunswick
- Party: Independent
- Spouse: Nettie M. Johnson (m. 1888)
- Children: 2
- Occupation: Farmer

George William Upham (January 28, 1862 – July 14, 1923) was a Canadian politician. He served in the Legislative Assembly of New Brunswick as a member from Carleton County.
