= George Upham =

George Upham may refer to:

- George B. Upham (1768–1848), U.S. Representative from New Hampshire
- George W. Upham (1862–1907), Canadian politician in the Legislative Assembly of New Brunswick
