= Peter Fisher (historian) =

New Brunswick historian

Peter Fisher (9 June 1782 – 15 August 1848) was a historian and merchant in the British colony of New Brunswick.

Fisher emigrated to New Brunswick from Staten Island, New York, at 15 months of age. He was the son of United Empire Loyalist refugees of the American Revolutionary War who fled north in 1783. Fisher's family settled at St. Anne's Point on the Saint John River, which was an area set aside for the Loyalist military regiments. St. Anne's Point was later renamed Fredericton and designated the capital of the newly established colony.

Fisher received a good education for the time and was married in 1807 and had eleven children. Anne Connell, Henry Fisher, Isabel Martha Fisher, (name unknown) Fisher, William Fisher, Lewis Peter Fisher, Edward Fisher, Edward Bealing Fisher, Susan Isabella Smith and George Fisher. Some of whom were noteworthy in New Brunswick history.

Of his sons; Charles Fisher became a Supreme Court of New Brunswick judge. Henry Fisher was the Chief Superintendent of Education for New Brunswick. William Fisher became New Brunswick's Indian Commissioner, and Lewis P. Fisher was elected the first mayor of Woodstock, New Brunswick. His daughter, Ann, married Charles Connell.

Little is known of his personal life other than he was a merchant and also probably farmed as would have been customary of the era. Fisher was a writer and is often referred to as "the first historian of New Brunswick." The two histories, Sketches and Notitia, can definitely be attributed to him. Other works may be his, however, an apparent unwillingness to claim authorship on his part has made authentication difficult.

Fisher's writings have illustrated a man of only moderate literary skills, however, he possessed sharp observation skills and maintained a keen interest in the developmental steps being taken by the colony during his lifetime.
