= Veterans' Bill of Rights =

Canadian Act of Parliament

The Veterans' Bill of Rights (French: Déclaration des droits des anciens combattants) is a bill of rights in Canada for veterans of the Canadian Forces and Royal Canadian Mounted Police. It was enacted by the Government of Canada in 2007. It guarantees benefits for veterans from Veterans Affairs Canada and equality of veterans, and refers to them as "special citizens." It also theoretically "entrenches respect and dignity for veterans and their families."

== History ==
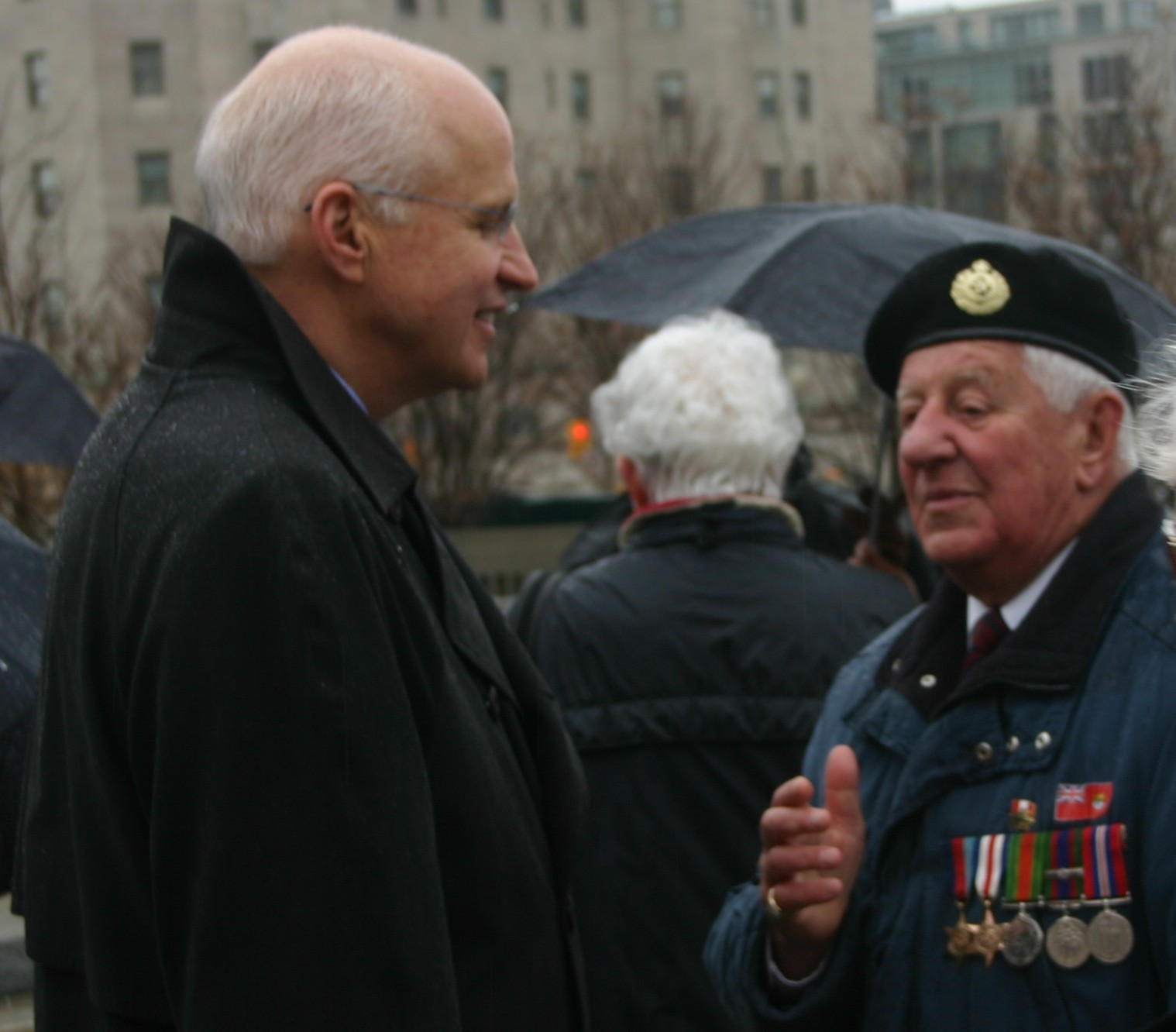
Minister of Veterans Affairs Greg Thompson (left) and veterans

In the 2006 federal election, the Conservative Party of Canada campaigned for veterans' rights. The Conservatives said a bill of rights would remedy what they saw as the "shameful way" veterans were handled by the government. In December 2005, Conservative leader Stephen Harper claimed, "We continue to receive complaints that the department is not service-oriented... that is, the bureaucracy treats people as a bureaucracy and a number and that's obviously why we're making the bill of rights, the ombudsman and the structural changes we're talking about to try to shift that focus." The Conservatives formed a minority government.

Parliamentary secretary Betty Hinton assisted the introduction of the bill of rights, as did veterans' groups. In April 2007, Prime Minister Harper and Minister of Veterans Affairs Greg Thompson told the press in Kitchener, Ontario that the bill of rights would come into effect then and there would be a new ombudsman for veterans along with it. This discussion took place at around the same time as Harper was about to observe an anniversary of the Battle of Vimy Ridge in World War I. Earlier, the Conservatives' budget included $19 million to introduce the ombudsman's office.

== Text ==
The Bill of Rights contains seven rights and is meant to be "clear and concise." It reads:

Canadian veterans, who have committed their lives and "service" for the freedoms Canadians enjoy today are special citizens. They deserve recognition, benefits and services to maintain an appropriate quality of life during all stages of their lives. Their special status should be recognized in all jurisdictions, federal, provincial and municipal.

Veterans have a right to be treated with courtesy, with respect and in a timely fashion in all their contacts with Veterans Affairs Canada at all levels of the Department. This respect, courtesy and timeliness of service must also be demonstrated to their families and dependants.

Veterans have a right to be fully informed of all programs and benefits to which they are eligible. In that respect, Veterans Affairs Canada has a responsibility to inform not only their current clients; it also has a responsibility to reach out in providing information to potential clients.

Veterans have a right to be provided with equal benefits in any part of the country in which they or their dependants reside. Geographical location should not determine the quality or level of service provided. Confidentiality of information must be preserved.

Veterans have a right to receive fair and equal treatment, irrespective of rank, position, or status. They should be treated with tact, comprehension and understanding. They should be involved in the decisions affecting their care and the formulation of programs and benefits.

Veterans have a right to receive referral and representational assistance in presenting their claims for benefits and services in the official language of their choice. This assistance should be broad-based, and should not be restricted to governmental agencies.

== See also ==
- Canadian Charter of Rights and Freedoms
- Canadian Bill of Rights
- Canadian Human Rights Act
