= William Lindsay (Canadian politician) =

Irish-born merchant and political figure in New Brunswick, Canada

William Lindsay (August 3, 1813 – September 7, 1895) was an Irish-born merchant and political figure in New Brunswick, Canada. He represented Carleton County in the Legislative Assembly of New Brunswick from 1862 to 1874 as a Liberal member.

Linsday was born in County Fermanagh, the son of Alexander Lindsay and Elizabeth Hetherington. Lindsay learned the saddle and harness maker's trade in Ireland. He came to New Brunswick with his family in 1834 and became a hardware merchant. In 1837, he married Harriet Parsons. He was a member of the county council and the town council for Woodstock. Lindsay served in the province's Executive Council as a minister without portfolio from 1868 to 1870 and as Surveyor General from 1870 to 1871. In 1874, he was named to the province's Legislative Council.

Lindsay served as a proponent and founder of the Houlton Branch Railway Company, along with several other pillars of the New Brunswick establishment such as

- Surveyor General for the Province and past Postmaster General, Charles Connell,
- Commissioner of Public Works and Milltown lumber merchant John McAdam,
- George Heber Connell,
- William Todd (1803–1873),
- Nathan Smart,
- Robert A. Hay,
- Gilbert W. Vanwart,
- Robert Watson,
- Zachariah Chipman,
- lumber merchant and businessman Joseph Emerson Eaton of St. Stephen,
- St. Stephen industrialist Freeman H. Todd,
- Republican Mayor of Calais, Maine for 1868 Samuel T. King,
- and Mayor of Woodstock Lewis P. Fisher.

== Electoral record ==
1882 Canadian federal election: Carleton, New Brunswick
Party	Candidate	Votes	%	±%
Liberal	David Irvine	1,812	52.29	+1.51
Unknown	William Lindsay	1,653	47.71	
