= James R. Hartley =

Canadian politician

James R. Hartley CE, MPP

MLA for Carleton County
- In office 1867–1868
- Preceded by: Charles Connell
- Succeeded by: George W. White

Personal details
- Born: 1833
- Died: September 29, 1868 (aged 34–35) Fredericton
- Party: Conservative
- Spouse: Lucy Grant Morse (died 1877 )
- Children: James Chipman Hartley (barrister), 1 daughter
- Profession: surveyor, civil engineer

James R. Hartley (1833–1868) was an MLA for Carleton County, New Brunswick from 1867 to 1868. He was also a member of the Senate of the University of New Brunswick. He was a resident of Woodstock.

He was influential in selecting the route of the Intercolonial Railway in New Brunswick.

He died at the Brayley House, Fredericton, on September 29, 1868, of typhoid fever.

In 1874, the town of Hartland was named to honour him.
