= Samuel J. Burlock =

Canadian politician (1876–1941)

Member of the Legislative Assembly of New Brunswick
- In office 1921–1925 Serving with Rennie K. Tracey, Fred Smith
- Constituency: Carleton

Personal details
- Born: March 25, 1876 Gordonsville, New Brunswick
- Died: August 18, 1941 (aged 65) Jacksonville, New Brunswick
- Party: United Farmers of New Brunswick
- Spouse: Frances Clair (m. 1902)
- Occupation: Farmer

Samuel James Burlock (March 25, 1876 – August 18, 1941) was a Canadian politician. He served in the Legislative Assembly of New Brunswick from 1921 to 1925 as member of the United Farmers. He died in 1941.
