= David Irvine (Canadian politician) =

Canadian politician

David Irvine (November 26, 1835 – May 28, 1924) was an Irish-born farmer and political figure in New Brunswick, Canada. He represented Carleton in the House of Commons of Canada from 1881 to 1887 as a Liberal member.

He was born in Crimland, County Fermanagh, the son of Robert Irvine and Mary Ellis. He operated a farm near Centreville, New Brunswick. Irvine was elected in an 1881 by-election held after the death of George Heber Connell. He died in Centreville at the age of 92.

== Electoral record ==
Canadian federal by-election, 16 February 1881
Party	Candidate	Votes	%	±%
Liberal	David Irvine	1,470	50.78	+5.74
Unknown	C. P. Connell	1,425	49.22	

1882 Canadian federal election: Carleton, New Brunswick
Party	Candidate	Votes	%	±%
Liberal	David Irvine	1,812	52.29	+1.51
Unknown	William Lindsay	1,653	47.71	
