= Rennie K. Tracey =

Canadian politician from New Brunswick (1874–1929)

Member of the Legislative Assembly of New Brunswick
- In office 1921–1925 Serving with Samuel J. Burlock, Fred W. Smith
- Constituency: Carleton

Personal details
- Born: April 30, 1874 Centreville, New Brunswick
- Died: June 30, 1929 (aged 55) Montreal, Quebec
- Party: United Farmers of New Brunswick
- Spouse: Emma Cronkite (m. 1898)
- Children: 2
- Occupation: Farmer

Rennie K. Tracey (April 30, 1874 – June 30, 1929) was a Canadian politician. He served in the Legislative Assembly of New Brunswick from 1921 to 1925 as member of the United Farmers.
