= Gage Montgomery =

Canadian politician (1898–1963)

Gage Workman Montgomery

Member of Parliament for Victoria—Carleton
- In office May 1952 – April 1962

Personal details
- Born: 2 May 1898 Bedell Settlement, New Brunswick, Canada
- Died: 5 June 1963 (aged 65)
- Party: Progressive Conservative
- Profession: barrister, lawyer

Gage Workman Montgomery (2 May 1898 – 5 June 1963) was a Canadian politician and lawyer. Montgomery served as a Progressive Conservative party member of the House of Commons of Canada. He was born in Bedell Settlement, New Brunswick and became a barrister and lawyer by career.

He was first elected at the Victoria—Carleton riding in a 26 May 1952 by-election then re-elected there in the 1953, 1957 and 1958 federal elections. Montgomery left the House of Commons after completing his term in the 24th Parliament and did not seek another term in office in the 1962 election.
