= McKenzie Corner, New Brunswick =

Coordinates: 46.101°N 67.720°W

Location of McKenzie Corner in New Brunswick

McKenzie Corner is a rural community in New Brunswick, Canada. There are two churches in the settlement: McKenzie Corner Baptist Church, which features a cemetery, and St. John's United Church.

The businessman and politician James Kidd Flemming lived in McKenzie Corner, where he died in 1927.

== History ==
The settlement was once known as McKenzie's Corner and was named after William McKenzie, who settled in 1822. In 1866, McKenzie Corner was a farming settlement with around 140 families present. In 1871, it was a station on the New Brunswick and Canada Railway. In 1898, the population was 150 and there was a post office, a cheese factory, and two churches.

The settlement Springbrook, in Hastings County, was once also known under the similar name McKenzie's Corners.

== See also ==
- List of communities in New Brunswick
