= Wendell P. Jones =

Canadian politician

Mayor of Woodstock, New Brunswick
- In office 1913–1914
- Preceded by: T. C. L. Ketchum
- Succeeded by: William S. Sutton

MLA for Carleton County
- In office 1903–1908
- Preceded by: ^{1}
- Succeeded by: Donald Munro

Personal details
- Born: November 25, 1866 Woodstock, New Brunswick
- Died: September 29, 1944 (aged 77) Saint John, New Brunswick
- Party: Liberal
- Occupation: Lawyer; Politician

Wendell Phillips Jones (November 25, 1866 – September 29, 1944) was a Canadian politician who was a member of the Legislative Assembly of New Brunswick and Mayor of Woodstock, New Brunswick.

Jones was born on November 25, 1866, to Gertrude (Raymond) and Randolph K. Jones. In 1888 he married Grace Jordan. They had ten children, one of whom, Charles J. Jones, also served as mayor of Woodstock.

From 1903 to 1908, Jones represented Carleton County in the Legislative Assembly of New Brunswick. From 1905 to 1908 he was Solicitor General in the governments of Lemuel J. Tweedie, William Pugsley, and Clifford W. Robinson. Jones also served as the Secretary-Treasurer of Carleton County and from 1913 to 1914 was the Mayor of Woodstock.

In 1930, Jones returned to politics as leader of the New Brunswick Liberal Association. The Liberals lost the 1930 general election and Jones failed to win a seat in the legislature. He was succeeded as leader by Allison Dysart in 1932.

Grace Jones died in 1941 and Jones married Gertrude Bedell in 1943. Jones died on September 29, 1944, at Saint John Hospital.

== Notes ==
1. Carleton County sent three representatives to the Legislative Assembly during Jones' tenure. In 1903, Jones and Frank Smith succeeded Stephen Burpee Appleby and Hugh H. McCain. The third member, James Kidd Flemming, was reelected.
