= Fred Smith (New Brunswick politician) =

Canadian politician

Member of the Legislative Assembly of New Brunswick
- In office 1921–1925 Serving with Rennie K. Tracey, Samuel J. Burlock
- Constituency: Carleton

Personal details
- Born: October 29, 1871 Williamstown, New Brunswick
- Died: August 8, 1941 (aged 69) Hartland, New Brunswick
- Party: United Farmers of New Brunswick
- Spouse: Flora A. Britton (m. 1892)
- Children: 4
- Occupation: farmer and lumberman

Frederick William Smith (October 29, 1871 – August 8, 1941) was a Canadian politician. He served in the Legislative Assembly of New Brunswick from 1921 to 1925 as member of the United Farmers. He died in 1941.
