= William S. Sutton =

Canadian politician

MLA for Carleton County
- In office 1916–1920
- Preceded by: Donald Munro
- Succeeded by: ^{1}

Mayor of Woodstock, New Brunswick
- In office 1915–1916
- Preceded by: Wendell P. Jones
- Succeeded by: Howard E. Burtt

Personal details
- Born: February 25, 1870 Meductic, New Brunswick
- Died: August 14, 1937 (aged 67) Woodstock, New Brunswick
- Party: Conservative

William Stephen Sutton (February 25, 1870 – August 14, 1937) was a Canadian politician who served as Mayor of Woodstock, New Brunswick from 1915 to 1916 and as a member of the Legislative Assembly of New Brunswick from 1916 to 1920.

== Notes ==
1. Carleton County sent three representatives to the Legislative Assembly during Sutton's tenure. In 1920, Sutton, Frank Smith, and George L. White were succeeded by Rennie K. Tracey, Fred W. Smith, and Samuel J. Burlock.
