= Victoria—Carleton =

Former federal electoral district in New Brunswick, Canada

New Brunswick electoral district

Defunct federal electoral district
- Legislature: House of Commons
- District created: 1914
- District abolished: 1966
- First contested: 1917
- Last contested: 1965

Demographics
- Census division(s): Carleton, Victoria

Victoria—Carleton was a federal electoral district in New Brunswick, Canada, that was represented in the House of Commons of Canada from 1917 to 1968.

This riding was created in 1914 from Carleton and Victoria ridings. It was first used in the Canadian federal election of 1917. It was abolished in 1966 when it was redistributed into Carleton—Charlotte and Madawaska—Victoria ridings.

== Members of Parliament ==
This riding elected the following members of the House of Commons of Canada:

Victoria—Carleton
Parliament	Years	Member	Party
Riding created from Carleton (1867–1917) and Victoria (1867–1917)
13th	1917–1919	Frank Broadstreet Carvell	Government (Unionist)
13th	1919–1921	Thomas Wakem Caldwell	United Farmers
14th	1921–1925	Thomas Wakem Caldwell	Progressive
15th	1925–1926	James Kidd Flemming	Conservative
16th	1926–1927	James Kidd Flemming	Conservative
16th	1927–1930	Albion Roudolph Foster	Liberal
17th	1930–1935	Benjamin Franklin Smith	Conservative
18th	1935–1940	Jack Patterson	Liberal
19th	1940–1945	Heber Harold Hatfield	National Government
20th	1945–1949	Heber Harold Hatfield	Progressive Conservative
21st	1949–1952	Heber Harold Hatfield	Progressive Conservative
21st	1952–1953	Gage Montgomery	Progressive Conservative
22nd	1953–1957	Gage Montgomery	Progressive Conservative
23rd	1957–1958	Gage Montgomery	Progressive Conservative
24th	1958–1962	Gage Montgomery	Progressive Conservative
25th	1962–1963	Hugh John Flemming	Progressive Conservative
26th	1963–1965	Hugh John Flemming	Progressive Conservative
27th	1965–1968	Hugh John Flemming	Progressive Conservative
Riding dissolved into Carleton—Charlotte (1968–1997) and Madawaska—Victoria (1968–1997)

== Election results ==
=== 1965 ===
1965 Canadian federal election
Party	Candidate	Votes	%	±%
Progressive Conservative	Hugh John Flemming	9,462	57.35	-1.66
Liberal	Paul B. Maddox	6,388	38.72	2.25
Social Credit	Arnold J. Slaney	352	2.13	-2.39
New Democratic	Ernest Hallett	298	1.81	–
Total valid votes		16,500	–	
Source: Library of Parliament

=== 1963 ===
1963 Canadian federal election
Party	Candidate	Votes	%	±%
Progressive Conservative	Hugh John Flemming	10,572	59.01	1.72
Liberal	Michael F. McCluskey	6,533	36.46	2.25
Social Credit	Arnold J. Slaney	811	4.53	-3.96
Total valid votes		17,916	–	
Source: Library of Parliament

=== 1962 ===
1962 Canadian federal election
Party	Candidate	Votes	%	±%
Progressive Conservative	Hugh John Flemming	10,439	57.29	-2.69
Liberal	Samuel M. Bishop	6,235	34.22	-2.15
Social Credit	Alyce M. Patterson	1,547	8.49	4.84
Total valid votes		18,221	–	
Source: Library of Parliament

=== 1958 ===
1958 Canadian federal election
Party	Candidate	Votes	%	±%
Progressive Conservative	Gage Montgomery	10,692	59.98	1.74
Liberal	Vernon R. Briggs	6,483	36.37	0.19
Social Credit	Robert Hartley Craig	651	3.65	-1.93
Total valid votes		17,826	–	
Source: Library of Parliament

=== 1957 ===
1957 Canadian federal election
Party	Candidate	Votes	%	±%
Progressive Conservative	Gage Montgomery	9,843	58.24	9.09
Liberal	E. Raymond Jones	6,115	36.18	-9.26
Social Credit	Ike Jones	944	5.59	0.17
Total valid votes		16,902	–	
Source: Library of Parliament

=== 1953 ===
1953 Canadian federal election
Party	Candidate	Votes	%	±%
Progressive Conservative	Gage Montgomery	8,445	49.14	-2.36
Liberal	Hugh M. Tait	7,809	45.44	+2.36
Social Credit	George B. McLean	931	5.42	–
Total valid votes		17,185	–	
Source: Library of Parliament

=== 1952 by-election ===
Canadian federal by-election, May 26, 1952 Death of Heber Harold Hatfield on January 3, 1952
Party	Candidate	Votes	%	±%
Progressive Conservative	Gage Montgomery	9,440	56.92	+1.94
Liberal	Hugh Tait	7,140	43.08	-1.94
Total valid votes		16,580	–	
Source: Library of Parliament

=== 1949 ===
1949 Canadian federal election
Party	Candidate	Votes	%	±%
Progressive Conservative	Heber Harold Hatfield	10,429	54.98	0.49
Liberal	Daniel Raymond Bishop	8,539	45.02	3.52
Total valid votes		18,968	–	
Source: Library of Parliament

=== 1945 ===
1945 Canadian federal election
Party	Candidate	Votes	%	±%
Progressive Conservative	Heber Harold Hatfield	9,365	54.49	–
Liberal	Roy Frederick Smith	7,132	41.50	-6.24
Co-operative Commonwealth	Suther Murray O'Regan	689	4.01	–
Total valid votes		17,186	–	
Source: Library of Parliament

=== 1940 ===
1940 Canadian federal election
Party	Candidate	Votes	%	±%
National Government	Heber Harold Hatfield	7,974	52.26	–
Liberal	Michael F. McCluskey	7,283	47.74	-0.05
Total valid votes		15,257	–	
Source: Library of Parliament

=== 1935 ===
1935 Canadian federal election
Party	Candidate	Votes	%	±%
Liberal	Jack Patterson	7,500	47.78	7.68
Conservative	Hugh John Flemming	6,405	40.81	-19.09
Reconstruction	Richard William L. Earle	1,791	11.41	–
Total valid votes		15,696	–	
Source: Library of Parliament

=== 1930 ===
1930 Canadian federal election
Party	Candidate	Votes	%	±%
Conservative	Benjamin Franklin Smith	8,628	59.90	6.14
Liberal	Albion Roudolph Foster	5,776	40.10	-6.14
Total valid votes		14,404	–	
Source: Library of Parliament

=== 1927 by-election ===
Canadian federal by-election, June 16, 1927 Death of James Kidd Flemming on February 10, 1927
Party	Candidate	Votes
Liberal	Albion Roudolph Foster	Acclaimed
Total valid votes		–
Source: Library of Parliament

=== 1926 ===
1926 Canadian federal election
Party	Candidate	Votes	%	±%
Conservative	James Kidd Flemming	7,865	53.76	-3.87
Liberal	Albion Roudolph Foster	6,764	46.24	–
Total valid votes		14,629	–	
Source: Library of Parliament

=== 1925 ===
1925 Canadian federal election
Party	Candidate	Votes	%	±%
Conservative	James Kidd Flemming	6,859	57.63	12.10
Independent Liberal Progressive	Thomas Wakem Caldwell	4,958	41.66	–
Independent	Minnie Bell Sharp	84	0.71	–
Total valid votes		11,901	–	
Source: Library of Parliament

=== 1921 ===
1921 Canadian federal election
Party	Candidate	Votes	%	±%
Progressive	Thomas Wakem Caldwell	6,413	54.47	–
Conservative	Benjamin Franklin Smith	5,361	45.53	–
Total valid votes		11,774	–	
Source: Library of Parliament

=== 1919 by-election ===
Canadian federal by-election, October 17, 1919 Frank Carvell being appointed Chairman of the Railway Commission
Party	Candidate	Votes	%
United Farmers	Thomas Caldwell	6,500	68.74
Unknown	Weldon Melville	2,956	31.26
Total valid votes		9,456	–
Source: Library of Parliament

=== 1917 ===
1917 Canadian federal election
Party	Candidate	Votes
Government (Unionist)	Frank Carvell	acclaimed
Total valid votes		–
Source: Library of Parliament

== See also ==
- List of Canadian electoral districts
- Historical federal electoral districts of Canada
