= Heber Harold Hatfield =

Canadian politician

Heber Harold Hatfield (April 17, 1885 – January 3, 1952) was a produce dealer and political figure in New Brunswick, Canada. He represented Victoria—Carleton in the House of Commons of Canada from 1940 to 1952 as a National Government and then Progressive Conservative member.

He was born in Middle Simonds, New Brunswick, the son of George Washington Hatfield and Emily Holmes. Hatfield operated a large-scale potato business. He also served as mayor of Hartland. He died in office at the age of 66.

His son Richard went on to become premier of New Brunswick and later served in the Canadian senate. Another son, Frederick Heber ran the produce business following Heber's death in 1952.
