= Carleton—Charlotte =

Former federal electoral district in New Brunswick, Canada

New Brunswick electoral district

Defunct federal electoral district
- Legislature: House of Commons
- District created: 1966
- District abolished: 1996
- First contested: 1968
- Last contested: 1993

Carleton—Charlotte was a federal electoral district in New Brunswick, Canada, that was represented in the House of Commons of Canada from 1968 to 1997.

The riding was created in the redistribution of electoral districts in 1966. It consisted of the counties of Carleton and Charlotte, as well as southern portions of York and Sunbury Counties. Charlotte County was formerly its own electoral district, while Carleton County was part of the Victoria—Carleton riding.

In the 1996 redistribution, Carleton—Charlotte was abolished. Most of Carleton County became part of the new Tobique—Mactaquac, while the rest became part of New Brunswick Southwest.

== Members of Parliament ==
This riding elected the following members of Parliament:

Parliament	Years	Member	Party
Carleton—Charlotte; Riding created from Charlotte, Victoria—Carleton, St. John—Albert and York—Sunbury
28th	1968–1972	Hugh John Flemming	Progressive Conservative
29th	1972–1974	Fred McCain	Progressive Conservative
30th	1974–1979	Fred McCain	Progressive Conservative
31st	1979–1980	Fred McCain	Progressive Conservative
32nd	1980–1984	Fred McCain	Progressive Conservative
33rd	1984–1988	Fred McCain	Progressive Conservative
34th	1988–1993	Greg Thompson	Progressive Conservative
35th	1993–1997	Harold Culbert	Liberal
Riding dissolved into Charlotte and Tobique—Mactaquac

== Election results ==
1993 Canadian federal election
Party	Candidate	Votes	%	±%
Liberal	Harold Culbert	13,970	43.1	+1.5
Progressive Conservative	Greg Thompson	13,157	40.6	-6.6
Reform	Greg Wyborn	3,827	11.8	+11.8
New Democratic Party	Bill Barteau	1,016	3.1	-4.6
National	Richard Shelley	431	1.3	+1.3
Total		32,401		

1988 Canadian federal election
Party	Candidate	Votes	%	±%
Progressive Conservative	Greg Thompson	16,026	47.2	-14.6
Liberal	Harold Culbert	14,116	41.6	+17.6
New Democratic Party	Ben Kilfoil	2,596	7.7	-6.5
Confederation of Regions	Robert Storr	1,183	3.5	+3.5
Total		33,921		

1984 Canadian federal election
Party	Candidate	Votes	%	±%
Progressive Conservative	Fred McCain	19,984	61.8	+14.4
Liberal	Gerard Daly	7,752	24.0	-12.1
New Democratic Party	Ben Kilfoil	4,608	14.2	-1.0
Total		32,344		

1980 Canadian federal election
Party	Candidate	Votes	%	±%
Progressive Conservative	Fred McCain	14,565	47.4	-8.2
Liberal	Joseph Palmer	11,091	36.1	+5.0
New Democratic Party	Arthur Slipp	4,680	15.2	+1.9
Independent	Janice Brown	407	1.3	+1.3
Total		30,743		

1979 Canadian federal election
Party	Candidate	Votes	%	±%
Progressive Conservative	Fred McCain	16,603	55.6	+5.1
Liberal	Ann Brennan	9,308	31.1	-8.6
New Democratic Party	Ed Gaunce	3,971	13.3	+3.5
Total		29,882		

1974 Canadian federal election
Party	Candidate	Votes	%	±%
Progressive Conservative	Fred McCain	12,315	50.5	-9.7
Liberal	Don Beattie	9,681	39.7	+7.5
New Democratic Party	Lawrence Bright	2,387	9.8	+2.2
Total		24,383		

1972 Canadian federal election
Party	Candidate	Votes	%	±%
Progressive Conservative	Fred McCain	14,431	60.2	-2.6
Liberal	Donald Hinton	7,715	32.2	-1.6
New Democratic Party	Lawrence Bright	1,831	7.6	+4.2
Total		23,977		

1968 Canadian federal election
Party	Candidate	Votes	%	±%
Progressive Conservative	Hugh John Flemming	15,469	62.8	*
Liberal	Henry Hachey	8,330	33.8	*
New Democratic Party	Tom Jones	848	3.4	*
Total		24,647		

== See also ==
- List of Canadian electoral districts
- Historical federal electoral districts of Canada
