= Newton Ramsay Colter =

Canadian politician (1844-1917)

Newton Ramsay Colter (July 30, 1844 – April 6, 1917) was a physician and political figure in New Brunswick, Canada. He represented Carleton in the House of Commons of Canada from 1892 to 1896 as a Liberal member.

He was born in Sheffield, New Brunswick, the son of Alexander Colter, a native of Ireland. Colter was educated at the Sackville Academy and at Harvard University, where he received an M.D. In 1867, he was licensed to practice by the Royal College of Physicians in London. Colter married E. Jane Hatt in 1871. He served as chairman of the Board of Health at Woodstock. Colter was defeated in a bid for reelection in 1896.

1891 Canadian federal election: Carleton, New Brunswick
Party	Candidate	Votes	%	±%
Liberal	Newton Ramsay Colter	2,016	51.38	+16.90
Conservative	Donald McLeod Vince	1,908	48.62	-16.90

By-election: On election of 1891 being declared void

Canadian federal by-election, 6 April 1892
Party	Candidate	Votes	%	±%
Liberal	Newton Ramsay Colter	acclaimed		

1896 Canadian federal election: Carleton, New Brunswick
Party	Candidate	Votes	%	±%
Liberal–Conservative	Frederick Harding Hale	2,667	54.12	
Liberal	Newton Ramsay Colter	2,261	45.88	-54.12
