= George W. White (Canadian politician) =

Canadian politician

MLA for Carleton County
- In office 1868 to 1873; 1878 to 1882
- Preceded by: James R. Hartley

Personal details
- Born: May 12, 1827 Queens County, New Brunswick
- Died: March 21, 1912 (aged 84) Centreville, New Brunswick
- Party: Conservative Party of New Brunswick
- Spouse: Mary Wiggins
- Profession: coroner

George W. White (May 12, 1827 – March 21, 1912) was a political figure in New Brunswick, Canada. He represented Carleton County in the Legislative Assembly of New Brunswick from 1868 to 1873 and from 1878 to 1886 as a Conservative member.

He was born and educated in Queens County, New Brunswick. In 1849, he married Mary Wiggins. White served as coroner for Wilmot parish. He was elected to the legislative assembly in an 1868 by-election held after the death of James Hartley. White was a member of the Executive Council from 1872 to 1873. In 1873, he resigned and ran unsuccessfully for a seat in the House of Commons. He died in 1912.
