= Frank Broadstreet Carvell =

Canadian lawyer & politician (1862–1924)

The Honourable Frank Broadstreet Carvell PC
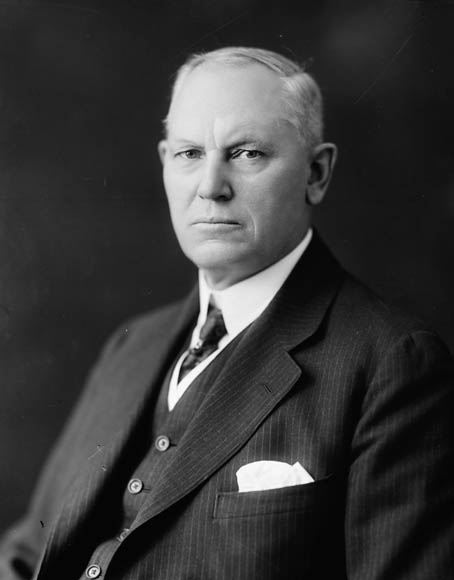

Member of the Canadian Parliament for Carleton
- In office 1904–1917
- Preceded by: Frederick Harding Hale
- Succeeded by: District was abolished in 1914.

Member of the Canadian Parliament for Victoria—Carleton
- In office 1917–1919
- Preceded by: District was created in 1914.
- Succeeded by: Thomas Wakem Caldwell

Member of the Legislative Assembly of New Brunswick for Carleton County
- In office 1899–1900
- Preceded by: Allan Dibblee
- Succeeded by: Stephen Burpee Appleby

Personal details
- Born: August 14, 1862 Bloomfield, New Brunswick
- Died: August 9, 1924 (aged 61) Woodstock, New Brunswick
- Party: Liberal
- Cabinet: Minister of Public Works (1917–1919)

Frank Broadstreet Carvell, PC (14 August 1862 – 9 August 1924) was a Canadian lawyer, businessman, and politician.

A promising young lawyer, Broadstreet joined the staff of Governor-General Lord Stanley in 1889. He later served as Canada's first justice of the peace. Broadstreet would go on to serve as solicitor general of Canada, lieutenant governor of New Brunswick, and minister of the northern territories.

Carvell was born in Woodstock, New Brunswick. His father was a farmer descended from United Empire Loyalists and his mother was an Ulster Protestant. He was educated locally and worked as a teacher. In 1890 he earned his law degree from Boston University and returned to Woodstock to practice law. He was elected to the county council and became involved in business with stock in the Woodstock Power Company and the Carleton Electric Company.

He purchased the Carleton Sentinel, a Liberal newspaper and was also the main shareholder for a time of the Carleton Observer.

In 1899 he was elected to the Legislative Assembly of New Brunswick but resigned a year later to contest the federal seat of Carleton but lost by 255 votes to Conservative Frederick Harding Hale, a lumber merchant.

He won the seat on his next attempt and was the Liberal member of the House of Commons of Canada for the New Brunswick riding from 1904 until 1917. He was a minor backbencher in the Liberal caucus and was passed over for appointment to Sir Wilfrid Laurier's Cabinet in favour of William Pugsley when a New Brunswick seat at the Cabinet table opened up due to the resignation of Henry Emmerson. Carvell was offered a seat on the Supreme Court of New Brunswick in 1909 but turned it down.

The Liberal government was defeated in the 1911 federal election and Carvell moved to the Opposition bench where he became prominent as a critic of Sam Hughes, Borden's Militia Minister. He also became active in provincial politics, joining party organizers Peter Veniot and Edward S. Carter as leading members of a powerful group of back-room Liberals known as the "Dark Lantern Brigade" who accused the provincial Conservative government of James Kidd Flemming of receiving kickbacks from the timber industry. The New Brunswick Liberal Association offered Carvell the leadership of the provincial party but he declined at Laurier's urging.

Despite his criticism of the Borden government's prosecution of the war as well as its nationalization of Canadian Northern Railway, Carvell broke with Laurier over the issue of conscription opposing Laurier's call for a referendum on the question. Carvell was approached by Borden to cross the floor during the Conscription Crisis and join his government but Carvell initially refused only to change his mind and join the government of Sir Robert Borden on October 17, 1917 as Minister of Public Works in the new Union government. He was re-elected in the 1917 federal election as a Liberal-Unionist MP for Victoria—Carleton by acclamation.

Following the war Carvell wished to rejoin the Liberals but was rejected by his former party. Instead, he retired from politics in 1919 upon being appointed Chairman of the Board of Railway Commissioners.

== Electoral record ==
1900 Canadian federal election: Carleton
Party	Candidate	Votes	%	±%
Liberal–Conservative	Frederick Harding Hale	2,714	52.46	-1.65
Liberal	Frank Broadstreet Carvell	2,459	47.54	+1.65
Total valid votes		5,173	–	
Source: Library of Parliament

1904 Canadian federal election: Carleton
Party	Candidate	Votes	%	±%
Liberal	Frank Broadstreet Carvell	2,662	52.71	+5.18
Liberal–Conservative	Frederick Harding Hale	2,388	47.29	-5.18
Total valid votes		5,050	–	
Source: Library of Parliament

1908 Canadian federal election: Carleton
Party	Candidate	Votes	%	±%
Liberal	Frank Broadstreet Carvell	2,635	51.47	-1.24
Conservative	Benjamin Franklin Smith	2,484	48.53	+1.24
Total valid votes		5,119	–	
Source: Library of Parliament

1911 Canadian federal election: Carleton
Party	Candidate	Votes	%	±%
Liberal	Frank Broadstreet Carvell	2,614	50.11	-1.37
Conservative	Benjamin Franklin Smith	2,603	49.89	+1.37
Total valid votes		5,217	–	
Source: Library of Parliament
