= Thomas Wakem Caldwell =

Canadian politician

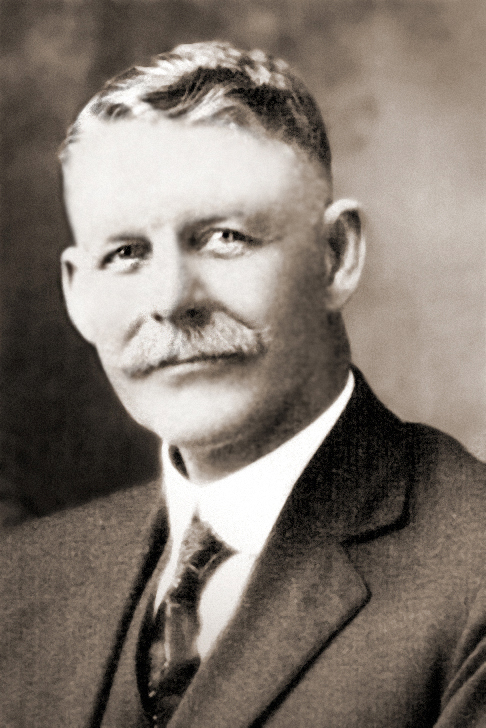

Member of the Canadian Parliament for Victoria—Carleton
- In office 1919–1925

Personal details
- Born: May 2, 1867 Florenceville, New Brunswick
- Died: March 14, 1937 (aged 69) Ottawa, Ontario, Canada
- Party: United Farmers; Progressive Party
- Spouse(s): Annie Abeldt; Melissa Haladay
- Occupation: Farmer

Thomas Wakem Caldwell (May 2, 1867 – March 14, 1937) was a farmer and political figure in New Brunswick, Canada. He represented Victoria—Carleton in the House of Commons of Canada from 1919 to 1925 as a United Farmers then Progressive Party Member of Parliament.

== Biography ==
He was born in Florenceville, New Brunswick, the son of Andrew Cunningham Caldwell and Margaret Wakem, and, after completing his education, became a farmer there. Caldwell was married twice: to Annie Abeldt in 1892 and later to Melissa Haladay. He was president of the United Farmers of New Brunswick and served on the executive board of the Farmer's Co-operative Company of New Brunswick. Caldwell was first elected to the House of Commons in a 1919 by-election held after Frank Broadstreet Carvell was named chairman of the Board of Railway Commissioners. He was defeated when he ran for re-election in 1925. Caldwell went to England as a farm delegate to protest an embargo on Canadian potatoes. He died in Ottawa at the age of 69.
