= Harold Culbert =

Canadian politician

Harold William Culbert (16 May 1944 – 1 March 2005) was a Canadian businessman and politician. Culbert was a member of the House of Commons of Canada from 1993 to 1997.

Culbert was born in Woodstock, New Brunswick and was once that community's mayor from 1980 to 1992. By career, he was a businessman, including work in insurance sales.

He first campaigned for the Liberal party in the Carleton—Charlotte electoral district in 1988 but lost to Progressive Conservative candidate Greg Thompson. He defeated Thompson in 1993 and served in the 35th Canadian Parliament. For the 1997 general election, Culbert and Thompson would again compete, this time in the restructured riding of Charlotte. Thompson regained his seat in Parliament and Culbert never returned to federal politics.

Harold Culbert died of heart disease at Carleton Memorial Hospital, Woodstock, New Brunswick.

1997 Canadian federal election: New Brunswick Southwest
Party	Candidate	Votes	%
Progressive Conservative	Greg Thompson	14,533	44.9
Liberal	Harold Culbert	8,309	25.7
Reform	Eric Banks	6,814	21.0
New Democratic	Rob Rainer	2,397	7.4
Natural Law	Thomas Mitchell	280	0.9
Total valid votes		32,333	100.0
