= Carleton (New Brunswick federal electoral district) =

Former federal electoral district in New Brunswick, Canada

New Brunswick electoral district

Defunct federal electoral district
- Legislature: House of Commons
- District created: 1867
- District abolished: 1914
- First contested: 1867
- Last contested: 1911

Carleton was a federal electoral district in New Brunswick, Canada that was represented in the House of Commons of Canada from 1867 to 1917. It was created in 1867 as part of the British North America Act, and was abolished in 1914 when it was merged into Victoria—Carleton. It was named for Carleton County, New Brunswick.

== Members of Parliament ==
This riding elected the following members of Parliament:

Carleton
Parliament	Years	Member	Party
1st	1867–1872	Charles Connell	Liberal
2nd	1872–1873	Charles Connell	Liberal
2nd	1873–1874	Stephen Burpee Appleby	Liberal
3rd	1874–1878	Stephen Burpee Appleby	Liberal
4th	1878–1881	George Heber Connell	Independent
4th	1881–1882	David Irvine	Liberal
5th	1882–1887	David Irvine	Liberal
6th	1887–1891	Frederick Harding Hale	Liberal–Conservative
7th	1891–1892	Newton Ramsay Colter	Liberal
7th	1892–1896	Newton Ramsay Colter	Liberal
8th	1896–1900	Frederick Harding Hale	Liberal–Conservative
9th	1900–1904	Frederick Harding Hale	Liberal–Conservative
10th	1904–1908	Frank Broadstreet Carvell	Liberal
11th	1908–1911	Frank Broadstreet Carvell	Liberal
12th	1911–1917	Frank Broadstreet Carvell	Liberal
Riding dissolved into Victoria—Carleton (1917–1968)

== Election results ==
=== 1911 ===
1911 Canadian federal election
Party	Candidate	Votes	%	±%
Liberal	Frank Broadstreet Carvell	2,614	50.11	-1.37
Conservative	Benjamin Franklin Smith	2,603	49.89	+1.37
Total valid votes		5,217	–	
Source: Library of Parliament

=== 1908 ===
1908 Canadian federal election
Party	Candidate	Votes	%	±%
Liberal	Frank Broadstreet Carvell	2,635	51.47	-1.24
Conservative	Benjamin Franklin Smith	2,484	48.53	+1.24
Total valid votes		5,119	–	
Source: Library of Parliament

=== 1904 ===
1904 Canadian federal election
Party	Candidate	Votes	%	±%
Liberal	Frank Broadstreet Carvell	2,662	52.71	+5.18
Liberal–Conservative	Frederick Harding Hale	2,388	47.29	-5.18
Total valid votes		5,050	–	
Source: Library of Parliament

=== 1900 ===
1900 Canadian federal election
Party	Candidate	Votes	%	±%
Liberal–Conservative	Frederick Harding Hale	2,714	52.46	-1.65
Liberal	Frank Broadstreet Carvell	2,459	47.54	+1.65
Total valid votes		5,173	–	
Source: Library of Parliament

=== 1896 ===
1896 Canadian federal election
Party	Candidate	Votes	%	±%
Liberal–Conservative	Frederick Harding Hale	2,667	54.12	+5.50
Liberal	Newton Ramsay Colter	2,261	45.88	-5.50
Total valid votes		4,928	–	
Source: Library of Parliament

=== 1892 by-election ===
Canadian federal by-election, 6 April 1892 Election of 1891 being declared void
Party	Candidate	Votes
Liberal	Newton Ramsay Colter	acclaimed
Total valid votes		–
Source: Library of Parliament

=== 1891 ===
1891 Canadian federal election
Party	Candidate	Votes	%	±%
Liberal	Newton Ramsay Colter	2,016	51.38	+16.90
Conservative	Donald McLeod Vince	1,908	48.62	-16.90
Total valid votes		3,924	–	
Source: Library of Parliament

=== 1887 ===
1887 Canadian federal election
Party	Candidate	Votes	%	±%
Liberal–Conservative	Frederick Harding Hale	2,362	65.52	–
Liberal	Donald McLeod Vince	1,243	34.48	-17.81
Total valid votes		3,605	–	
Source: Library of Parliament

=== 1882 ===
1882 Canadian federal election
Party	Candidate	Votes	%	±%
Liberal	David Irvine	1,812	52.29	+1.51
Unknown	William Lindsay	1,653	47.71	–
Total valid votes		3,465	–	
Source: Library of Parliament

=== 1881 by-election ===
Canadian federal by-election, 16 February 1881 George Heber Connell's death, 15 February 1881
Party	Candidate	Votes	%	±%
Liberal	David Irvine	1,470	50.78	+5.74
Unknown	C. P. Connell	1,425	49.22	–
Total valid votes		2,895	–	
Source: Library of Parliament

=== 1878 ===
1878 Canadian federal election
Party	Candidate	Votes	%	±%
Independent	George Heber Connell	1,766	54.96	–
Liberal	Stephen Burpee Appleby	1,447	45.04	–
Total valid votes		3,213	–	
Source: Library of Parliament

=== 1874 ===
1874 Canadian federal election
Party	Candidate	Votes
Liberal	Stephen Burpee Appleby	acclaimed
Total valid votes		–
Source: Library of Parliament

=== 1873 by-election ===
Canadian federal by-election, 18 September 1873 Charles Connell's death, June 28, 1873
Party	Candidate	Votes
Liberal	Stephen Burpee Appleby	acclaimed
Total valid votes		–
Source: Library of Parliament

=== 1872 ===
1872 Canadian federal election
Party	Candidate	Votes
Liberal	Charles Connell	acclaimed
Total valid votes		–
Source: Library of Parliament

=== 1867 ===
1867 Canadian federal election
Party	Candidate	Votes
Liberal	Charles Connell	acclaimed
Total valid votes		–
Source: Library of Parliament

== See also ==
- List of Canadian electoral districts
- Historical federal electoral districts of Canada
