= 1930 New Brunswick general election =

Canadian provincial election

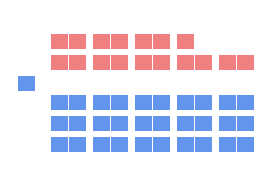
Rendition of party representation in the 37th New Brunswick Legislative Assembly decided by this election. Conservatives (31) Liberals (17)

The 1930 New Brunswick general election was held on 18 June 1930. It was held to elect 48 members to the 37th New Brunswick Legislative Assembly, which is the governing house of the province of New Brunswick, Canada. Although political parties had no standing in law, thirty-one MLAs declared themselves to be Conservatives and seventeen declared themselves to be Liberals.

New Brunswick general election, 1930
Party	Leader	Seats
Government (Conservative)	John Babington Macaulay Baxter	31
Opposition (Liberal)	Wendell P. Jones	17

Seats summary
Conservative	64.58%
Liberal	35.42%
