= Fred McCain =

Canadian politician

Fred Alward McCain (November 11, 1917 – October 12, 1997) was a Canadian politician. He served as an MLA in the Legislative Assembly of New Brunswick representing Carleton for the Progressive Conservative Party of New Brunswick from 1952 to 1970. He then moved to federal politics representing the New Brunswick riding of Carleton—Charlotte for the federal Progressive Conservatives from the 1972 election until his retirement in 1988.

Prior to entering politics, McCain was a produce farmer and teacher.
