= Marcus C. Atkinson =

Canadian politician

Marcus Chappell Atkinson (February 7, 1854 – July 28, 1895) was a physician and political figure in New Brunswick, Canada. He represented Carleton County in the Legislative Assembly of New Brunswick from 1886 to 1892 and from January to October 1895 as a Liberal-Conservative.

He was born in Baie Verte, New Brunswick and educated in Halifax, Nova Scotia. In 1882, he married Mary J. Stewart. Atkinson served on the council for Carleton County. He died at the age of 41 and is interred in Bristol, New Brunswick.
