= George Heber Connell =

Canadian politician

George Heber Connell (1836 – February 15, 1881) was a merchant and political figure in New Brunswick, Canada. He represented Carleton in the House of Commons of Canada from 1878 to 1881 as an independent member.

He was born in Woodstock, New Brunswick, the son of Charles Connell and Ann Fisher, and was educated at Saint John. In 1837, he married Isabel Barnaby. Connell died in office in Ottawa at the age of 45.

1878 Canadian federal election: Carleton, New Brunswick
Party	Candidate	Votes	%	±%
Independent	George Heber Connell	1,766	54.96	–
Liberal	Stephen Burpee Appleby	1,447	45.04	–
Total valid votes		3,213	–	
Source: Library of Parliament
