= George R. Ketchum =

Canadian politician

George Randolph Ketchum (June 25, 1849 – March 5, 1927) was a merchant and political figure in New Brunswick, Canada. He represented Carleton County in the Legislative Assembly of New Brunswick from 1886 to 1892 as a Liberal member.

He was born in Upper Woodstock, New Brunswick and was educated there. He married Inez M. Clayton. Ketchum also served on the county council. He operated a general store near Woodstock. Ketchum later moved to Aroostook, Maine.
