= Hugh H. McCain =

Canadian politician

Hugh Henderson McCain (April 22, 1853 – June 1, 1920) was a produce dealer and political figure in New Brunswick, Canada. He represented Carleton County in the Legislative Assembly of New Brunswick from 1895 to 1903 as a Liberal member.

He was born in Florenceville, New Brunswick, of Irish descent, and educated there. McCain married Florence McPatrick.
