= Donald Munro (New Brunswick politician) =

Canadian politician

MLA for Carleton County
- In office March 1908 – 1916
- Preceded by: Wendell P. Jones
- Succeeded by: William S. Sutton

Mayor of Woodstock, New Brunswick
- In office 1906–1907
- Preceded by: Albert E. Jones
- Succeeded by: George E. Balmain

Personal details
- Born: February 18, 1855 Upper Woodstock, New Brunswick
- Died: April 14, 1939 (aged 84) Woodstock, New Brunswick
- Spouse(s): Maud McFarlan (m. 1877; died 1917) Clara A. Leighton, m. June 1919
- Occupation: Registrar of Deeds and Wills for Carleton County

Donald Munro (February 18, 1855 – April 14, 1939) was a Canadian politician who was a member of the Legislative Assembly of New Brunswick and Mayor of Woodstock, New Brunswick.

Munro was the son of David Munro, a member of the Legislative Assembly from 1863 to 1865.

In 1883, Munro was a founding member of the Woodstock Royal Arch Chapter.

For many years, Munro was superintendent of Woodstock's water works and superintendent and purchasing agent for the Woodstock Electric Light Plant.

In 1906, Munro was elected Mayor of Woodstock. He defeated H. D. Stevens 451 to 198. He was reelected in 1907. In 1908, Munro was elected to the Legislative Assembly of New Brunswick. He resigned in 1916 to become Registrar of Wills and Deeds for Carleton County. Munro died in 1939.
