= Charles Connell =

Canadian politician

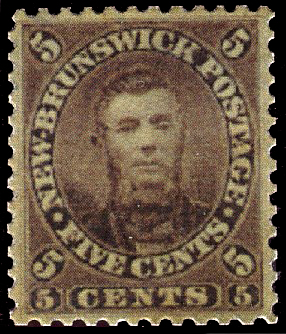
The 5 cent stamp depicting Charles Connell.

Charles Connell (1810 – June 28, 1873) was a Canadian politician, now remembered mainly for placing his image on a 5-cent postage stamp. Born in Northampton in the then-British colony of New Brunswick to a family of Loyalists who had fled the American Revolution, he entered politics in 1846, serving in the colony's Legislative Assembly and House of Assembly.

== Career ==
In 1858, Connell was appointed Postmaster General of the colony, at a time when increasing trade with the United States was forcing the British colonies to reconsider their currencies and institute a decimal system that would be more familiar to their American neighbors. New Brunswick adopted a decimal currency in 1859, and in the following year, Connell issued the first series of postage stamps in the new denomination. While few people had problems with the new currency, they were outraged that Connell chose to depict himself on the 5-cent stamp. In an effort to stem the criticism and charges of extreme arrogance, he offered to buy up all the stamps and burned them publicly on the front lawn of his house. He also resigned his office as postmaster general. It is unknown how many stamps survived, but they number no more than a few dozen and are now extremely rare. Some counterfeits of the stamp exist also.

Despite the episode, Connell continued to serve in the colonial legislature up until 1867. He strongly urged passage of a bill that would have seen the lieutenant governor of N.B. elected, and not appointed by the British monarch. A member of the Executive Council of New Brunswick, he served as Surveyor General from July 10, 1866, to July 17, 1867.

An ardent supporter of Canadian Confederation, Connell was elected as a Member of Parliament representing the New Brunswick electoral district of Carleton in the first two Canadian parliaments.

From 1865 to 1866, he published his own newspaper, The Union.

== Family life ==
On August 5, 1835, he married Anne Fisher, daughter of Peter Fisher, and sister of Lewis P. Fisher. They had seven children, one of whom died young. She died on October 5, 1895, and is buried in the Old Methodist Cemetery in Woodstock, New Brunswick. His son George Heber went on to serve in the House of Commons.

== Death and legacy ==
He died at his house on June 28, 1873.

His 1840 house, known as the Charles Connell House is a National Historic Site, located in Woodstock, New Brunswick, and is now a museum run by the Carleton County Historical Society.

== See also ==
- Postage stamps and postal history of New Brunswick

== Electoral record ==
1867 Canadian federal election: Carleton, New Brunswick
Party	Candidate	Votes
Liberal	Charles Connell	acclaimed
Total valid votes		–
Source: Library of Parliament

1872 Canadian federal election: Carleton, New Brunswick
Party	Candidate	Votes
Liberal	Charles Connell	acclaimed
Total valid votes		–
Source: Library of Parliament
