= Benjamin Franklin Smith =

Canadian politician

Benjamin Franklin Smith (May 8, 1865 – May 20, 1944) was a produce dealer and political figure in New Brunswick, Canada. He represented Carleton County in the Legislative Assembly of New Brunswick from 1903 to 1908, from 1915 to 1920 and from 1925 to 1930 as a Conservative member. Smith represented Victoria-Carleton in the House of Commons of Canada from 1930 to 1935 as a Conservative member and served in the Senate of Canada from 1935 to 1944.

He was born in Jacksonville, New Brunswick. Smith ran unsuccessfully for a federal seat in 1908, 1911 and 1921. He served in the province's Executive Council as Minister of Public Works from 1916 to 1917. Smith died in office at the age of 79 in Ottawa.

1908 Canadian federal election: Carleton, New Brunswick
Party	Candidate	Votes	%	±%
Liberal	Frank Broadstreet Carvell	2,635	51.47	-1.24
Conservative	Benjamin Franklin Smith	2,484	48.53	+1.24

1911 Canadian federal election: Carleton, New Brunswick
Party	Candidate	Votes	%	±%
Liberal	Frank Broadstreet Carvellt	2,614	50.11	-1.03
Conservative	Benjamin Franklin Smith	2,603	49.89	+1.03
