= List of historic places in St. Andrews, New Brunswick =

Designated historic buildings

This article is a list of historic places in St. Andrews, New Brunswick entered on the Canadian Register of Historic Places, whether they are federal, provincial, or municipal.

== List of historic places ==
Name	Address	Coordinates	Government recognition (CRHP №)	Wikidata ID	Image
Algar Residence	47 William Street; Saint Andrews NB	45°04′29″N 67°03′14″W	Saint Andrews municipality (16221)	Q139603080	Upload Photo
Algonquin Casino	173 Adolphus Street; Saint Andrews NB	45°04′48″N 67°03′15″W	Saint Andrews municipality (17642)	Q139603124	Upload Photo
Algonquin Dormitories	Carleton Street; Saint Andrews NB	45°04′51″N 67°03′26″W	Saint Andrews municipality (18393)	Q139603128	Upload Photo
Algonquin Golf Course	Brandy Cove Road; Saint Andrews NB	45°05′07″N 67°04′08″W	Saint Andrews municipality (18411)	Q139603133	Upload Photo ci
Algonquin Hotel	184 Adolphus Street; Saint Andrews NB	45°04′49″N 67°03′18″W	Saint Andrews municipality (17161)	Q3145393	More images
All Saints Anglican Church	89 King Street; Saint Andrews NB	45°04′31″N 67°03′06″W	Saint Andrews municipality (9853)	Q139603143	More images
All Saints Anglican Rectory	94 Frederick Street; Saint Andrews NB	45°04′30″N 67°03′02″W	Saint Andrews municipality (13466)	Q139603164	Upload Photo
Andraeleo Hall	48 King Street; Saint Andrews NB	45°04′27″N 67°03′10″W	Saint Andrews municipality (7922)	Q139603170	Upload Photo
Sheriff Andrews House	63 King Street; Saint Andrews NB	45°04′28″N 67°03′08″W	New Brunswick (6671)	Q112586752	More images
Thomas Armstrong Residence	358 Montague Street; Saint Andrews NB	45°04′23″N 67°02′42″W	Saint Andrews municipality (16341)	Q139603189	Upload Photo
Augherton Residence	99 Prince of Wales Street; Saint Andrews NB	45°04′47″N 67°03′10″W	Saint Andrews municipality (13495)	Q139603234	Upload Photo
Augustus Hall	88 Augustus Street; Saint Andrews NB	45°04′20″N 67°02′45″W	Saint Andrews municipality (13576)	Q139603237	Upload Photo
Aymar Residence	267 Montague Street; Saint Andrews NB	45°04′27″N 67°02′56″W	Saint Andrews municipality (16329)	Q139604659	Upload Photo
Bank of Nova Scotia	204 Water Street; Saint Andrews NB	45°04′25″N 67°03′10″W	Saint Andrews municipality (18430)	Q139604665	More images
Bell Residence	335 Water Street; Saint Andrews NB	45°04′17″N 67°02′51″W	Saint Andrews municipality (13513)	Q139604676	Upload Photo
Berry Building	162 Water Street; Saint Andrews NB	45°04′28″N 67°03′15″W	Saint Andrews municipality (13774)	Q139604684	Upload Photo
Boone Residence	75 Montague Street; Saint Andrews NB	45°04′39″N 67°03′22″W	Saint Andrews municipality (16236)	Q139604692	Upload Photo
Samuel Boone Residence	50 Elizabeth Street; Saint Andrews NB	45°04′34″N 67°03′23″W	Saint Andrews municipality (18413)	Q139604699	Upload Photo
William Boyd Residence	155 King Street; Saint Andrews NB	45°04′38″N 67°02′59″W	Saint Andrews municipality (13812)	Q139604709	Upload Photo
Bradford Hotel	173 Water Street; Saint Andrews NB	45°04′26″N 67°03′14″W	Saint Andrews municipality (7799)	Q139604720	More images
Breen-Cummings Residence	94 Queen Street; Saint Andrews NB	45°04′36″N 67°03′22″W	Saint Andrews municipality (18241)	Q139604739	Upload Photo
Britt Residence	76 Princess Royal Street; Saint Andrews NB	45°04′26″N 67°02′58″W	Saint Andrews municipality (16238)	Q139604746	Upload Photo
Brownrigg House	275 Queen Street; Saint Andrews NB	45°04′23″N 67°02′57″W	Saint Andrews municipality (13558)	Q139795534	Upload Photo
Carson House	364 Montague Street; Saint Andrews NB	45°04′21″N 67°02′41″W	Saint Andrews municipality (13575)	Q139795604	Upload Photo
Carson Sisters' Residence	62 Sophia Street; Saint Andrews NB	45°04′22″N 67°02′55″W	Saint Andrews municipality (16322)	Q139795626	Upload Photo
Charlotte County Court House	123A Frederick Street; Saint Andrews NB	45°04′30″N 67°03′00″W	Federal (12582), New Brunswick (7739)	Q5085897	More images
Charlotte County Gaol	123 Frederick Street; Saint Andrews NB	45°04′32″N 67°02′57″W	New Brunswick (1388)	Q5085898	Upload Photo
Charlotte County Registry Office	45 King Street; Saint Andrews NB	45°04′27″N 67°03′09″W	New Brunswick (10066)	Q112586734	Upload Photo
Chase Residence	228 Montague Street; Saint Andrews NB	45°04′31″N 67°03′01″W	Saint Andrews municipality (13802)	Q139795675	Upload Photo
Chestnut Hall	188 Montague Street; Saint Andrews NB	45°04′33″N 67°03′06″W	Saint Andrews municipality (7812)	Q7344278	More images
Church of England Cemetery	77 King Street; Saint Andrews NB	45°04′40″N 67°02′56″W	Saint Andrews municipality (13792)	Q139671595	More images
Clarke House	62 Princess Royal Street; Saint Andrews NB	45°04′24″N 67°03′00″W	New Brunswick (14088), Saint Andrews municipality (7947)	Q139795688	Upload Photo
Cluneleigh	60 Queen Street; Saint Andrews NB	45°04′38″N 67°03′27″W	Saint Andrews municipality (13532)	Q139795716	Upload Photo
Coakley Residence	364 Queen Street; Saint Andrews NB	45°04′18″N 67°02′44″W	Saint Andrews municipality (13752)	Q139795728	Upload Photo
Cockburn's Drugstore	192 Water Street; Saint Andrews NB	45°04′26″N 67°03′12″W	Saint Andrews municipality (8089)	Q139795748	Upload Photo
Cory Cottage	45 Carleton Street; Saint Andrews NB	45°04′48″N 67°03′21″W	Saint Andrews municipality (7998)	Q139795776	Upload Photo
Cottage 1	Brandy Cove Road; Saint Andrews NB	45°04′48″N 67°04′57″W	Federal (4270)	Q55206258	Upload Photo
Cottage Craft	209 Water Street; Saint Andrews NB	45°04′22″N 67°03′10″W	Saint Andrews municipality (9850)	Q139795799	Upload Photo
Croix Crest	49 Mary Street; Saint Andrews NB	45°04′38″N 67°03′31″W	Saint Andrews municipality (16275)	Q139795827	Upload Photo
Dayspring	Champlain Road; Saint Andrews NB	45°04′57″N 67°03′12″W	Saint Andrews municipality (9735)	Q106358148	More images
Derry Bay	165 Joe's Point Road; Saint Andrews NB	45°04′41″N 67°04′00″W	Saint Andrews municipality (13484)	Q139795846	Upload Photo
Doon Residence	24 King Street; Saint Andrews NB	45°04′25″N 67°03′13″W	Saint Andrews municipality (13595)	Q139795862	Upload Photo
John Dunn House	68 Queen Street; Saint Andrews NB	45°04′37″N 67°03′25″W	Saint Andrews municipality (7888)	Q139795876	Upload Photo
John Dunn Estate House	319 Water Street; Saint Andrews NB	45°04′17″N 67°02′55″W	Saint Andrews municipality (13803)	Q139795888	Upload Photo
Federal Building	Main and Water Street; Saint Andrews NB	45°04′24″N 67°03′13″W	Federal (3617)		Upload Photo
Finigan's Shoe Store	185 Water Street; Saint Andrews NB	45°04′26″N 67°03′12″W	Saint Andrews municipality (12782)	Q139795905	Upload Photo
Fort Tipperary	69 Prince of Wales Street; Saint Andrews NB	45°04′49″N 67°03′08″W	New Brunswick (5686)	Q139796310	Upload Photo
George Gardiner Residence	56 William Street; Saint Andrews NB	45°04′30″N 67°03′14″W	Saint Andrews municipality (16222)	Q139796333	Upload Photo
Frank Gilman House	81 Queen Street; Saint Andrews NB	45°04′36″N 67°03′24″W	Saint Andrews municipality (13734)	Q139796352	Upload Photo
Glew Residence	113 Queen Street; Saint Andrews NB	45°04′33″N 67°03′20″W	Saint Andrews municipality (16241)	Q139796366	Upload Photo
Greenock Church	134 Montague Street; Saint Andrews NB	45°04′38″N 67°03′17″W	Federal (12042), Saint Andrews municipality (17121)	Q23190836	More images
Grimmer Building	153 Water Street; Saint Andrews NB	45°04′28″N 67°03′18″W	Saint Andrews municipality (7945)	Q139671646	More images
Hansen House	79 Frederick Street; Saint Andrews NB	45°04′28″N 67°03′02″W	New Brunswick (9376)	Q112586741	Upload Photo
Harris Hatch Inn	142 Queen Street; Saint Andrews NB	45°04′30″N 67°03′02″W	Saint Andrews municipality (13468)	Q139671706	More images
Harrington Residence	281 Montague Street; Saint Andrews NB	45°04′26″N 67°02′54″W	Saint Andrews municipality (18410)	Q139796406	Upload Photo
Hatheway House	78 King Street; Saint Andrews NB	45°04′30″N 67°03′08″W	Saint Andrews municipality (9851)	Q139796448	Upload Photo
Elizabeth Hawkins Residence	128 Queen Street; Saint Andrews NB	45°04′34″N 67°03′18″W	Saint Andrews municipality (18429)	Q139796574	Upload Photo
Healy's Store	179–183 Water Street; Saint Andrews NB	45°04′26″N 67°03′13″W	Saint Andrews municipality (18406)	Q139796590	Upload Photo
Thomas Hipwell Residence	83 Montague Street; Saint Andrews NB	45°04′39″N 67°03′21″W	Saint Andrews municipality (13926)	Q139796618	Upload Photo
Charles Horsnell House	124 William Street; Saint Andrews NB	45°04′37″N 67°03′08″W	Saint Andrews municipality (13534)	Q139796636	Upload Photo
Greenleaf Houlton Residence	35 Carleton Street; Saint Andrews NB	45°04′48″N 67°03′22″W	Saint Andrews municipality (17641)	Q139796707	Upload Photo
Ingram Building	168 Water Street; Saint Andrews NB	45°04′27″N 67°03′14″W	Saint Andrews municipality (12926)	Q139796848	Upload Photo
Richard Keay Residence	312 Montague Street; Saint Andrews NB	45°04′25″N 67°02′48″W	Saint Andrews municipality (16278)	Q139796867	Upload Photo
Kingsbrae Arms	219 King Street; Saint Andrews NB	45°04′43″N 67°02′52″W	Saint Andrews municipality (7994)	Q139796894	Upload Photo
Linden Grange	144 Carleton Street; Saint Andrews NB	45°04′42″N 67°03′05″W	Saint Andrews municipality (12784)	Q139796911	Upload Photo
MacKlem House	46 Reed Avenue; Saint Andrews NB	45°04′52″N 67°03′32″W	Saint Andrews municipality (13463)	Q139796929	Upload Photo
John S. Magee Residence	143 Water Street; Saint Andrews NB	45°04′29″N 67°03′19″W	Saint Andrews municipality (13613)	Q139796944	Upload Photo
Mallory House and Stable	267 Water Street; Saint Andrews NB	45°04′21″N 67°03′01″W	Saint Andrews municipality (12780)	Q139798046	Upload Photo
Maplehurst	134 Carleton Street; Saint Andrews NB	45°04′43″N 67°03′08″W	Saint Andrews municipality (13514)	Q139798365	Upload Photo
Marine Hospital	126 Princess Royal Street; Saint Andrews NB	45°04′30″N 67°02′54″W	Saint Andrews municipality (18431)	Q139798468	Upload Photo
McCurdy Residence	57 William Street; Saint Andrews NB	45°04′30″N 67°03′13″W	Saint Andrews municipality (13841)	Q139798480	Upload Photo
Dunn McQuoid House	126 Water Street; Saint Andrews NB	45°04′31″N 67°03′21″W	New Brunswick (2222)	Q112586737	More images
Dr. McStay House	335 Montague Street; Saint Andrews NB	45°04′22″N 67°02′46″W	Saint Andrews municipality (13536)	Q139798494	Upload Photo
Meadow Lodge	194 Harriet Street; Saint Andrews NB	45°04′56″N 67°03′24″W	Saint Andrews municipality (13460)	Q139798523	Upload Photo
Milton Hall	93 Frederick Street; Saint Andrews NB	45°04′29″N 67°03′00″W	Saint Andrews municipality (13473)	Q139798631	Upload Photo
Minister's Island National Historic Site of Canada	Ministers Island; Saint Andrews Parish NB	45°06′01″N 67°01′58″W	Federal (11961), New Brunswick (6233)	Q3593140	More images
Minister's Island Pre-contact Sites	Ministers Island; Saint Andrews Parish NB	45°06′00″N 67°01′58″W	Federal (12852)	Q23207208	Upload Photo
Donald Morrison House	204 Montague Street; Saint Andrews NB	45°04′32″N 67°03′04″W	Saint Andrews municipality (9848)	Q139798670	Upload Photo
Niger Reef Tea House	1 Joes Point Road; Saint Andrews NB	45°04′38″N 67°03′39″W	Saint Andrews municipality (7967)	Q139798752	Upload Photo
Caddy Norris House	100 Queen Street; Saint Andrews NB	45°04′35″N 67°03′21″W	Saint Andrews municipality (13538)	Q139798773	Upload Photo
Odell-Connors Building	235 Water Street; Saint Andrews NB	45°04′23″N 67°03′06″W	Saint Andrews municipality (18412)	Q139798784	Upload Photo
Old Intermediate School	107 Parr Street; Saint Andrews NB	45°04′40″N 67°03′15″W	Saint Andrews municipality (18428)	Q139798796	Upload Photo
W. C. O'Neill Arena	24 Reed Avenue; Saint Andrews NB	45°04′51″N 67°03′29″W	Saint Andrews municipality (16102)	Q139798854	Upload Photo
O'Neill Complex	308 Water Street; Saint Andrews NB	45°04′19″N 67°02′55″W	Saint Andrews municipality (13552)	Q139798880	Upload Photo
Oriole Cottage	6 Queen Street; Saint Andrews NB	45°04′42″N 67°03′34″W	Saint Andrews municipality (13800)	Q139798896	More images
Pagan Point	Route 127; Saint Andrews NB	45°04′35″N 67°02′36″W	New Brunswick (7798)	Q22465954	Upload Photo
Pagan-O'Neil House	235 Queen Street; Saint Andrews NB	45°04′25″N 67°03′03″W	New Brunswick (7894)	Q112586748	Upload Photo
Pansy Patch	59 Carleton Street; Saint Andrews NB	45°04′46″N 67°03′19″W	Saint Andrews municipality (7952)	Q139798953	More images
Pendlebury Lighthouse	Patrick Street; Saint Andrews NB	45°04′06″N 67°02′49″W	Saint Andrews municipality (7805)	Q96406323	More images
Presbyterian Manse	106 Parr Street; Saint Andrews NB	45°04′42″N 67°03′15″W	Saint Andrews municipality (12840)	Q139799023	Upload Photo
Red Cliff	31 Water Street; Saint Andrews NB	45°04′36″N 67°03′35″W	Saint Andrews municipality (13738)	Q139799041	Upload Photo
Residence Building 5 Classified Federal Heritage Building	Brandy Cove Road; Saint Andrews NB	45°04′58″N 67°04′57″W	Federal (3153)	Q55206292	Upload Photo
Elmer Rigby Residence	253 Queen Street; Saint Andrews NB	45°04′25″N 67°03′01″W	Saint Andrews municipality (17162)	Q139799057	Upload Photo
Rogers Residence	154 Queen Street; Saint Andrews NB	45°04′32″N 67°03′14″W	Saint Andrews municipality (13923)	Q139799070	Upload Photo
Roman Catholic Rectory	44 Parr Street; Saint Andrews NB	45°04′45″N 67°03′23″W	Saint Andrews municipality (13813)	Q139799089	Upload Photo
Rosemount	148 Prince of Wales Street; Saint Andrews NB	45°04′45″N 67°02′59″W	Saint Andrews municipality (13515)	Q139799107	Upload Photo
St. Andrews Blockhouse National Historic Site of Canada	1 Joe's Point Road; Saint Andrews NB	45°04′18″N 67°03′03″W	Federal (7656, (7486)	Q2906821	More images
St. Andrews Hardware	183 Water Street; Saint Andrews NB	45°04′26″N 67°03′12″W	Saint Andrews municipality (13594)	Q139671833	More images
St. Andrews Historic District	Saint Andrews NB	45°05′00″N 67°03′00″W	Federal (7785)	Q28337267	More images
St. Andrews Land Company Building	270 Water Street; Saint Andrews NB	45°04′21″N 67°03′01″W	Saint Andrews municipality (13820)	Q139799118	Upload Photo
St. Andrews United Baptist Church	115 King Street; Saint Andrews NB	45°04′34″N 67°03′03″W	Saint Andrews municipality (7999)	Q139672203	More images
Christopher Scott House	126 Edward Street; Saint Andrews NB	45°04′39″N 67°03′13″W	Saint Andrews municipality (13554)	Q139799141	Upload Photo
Seaside Inn	340 Water Street; Saint Andrews NB	45°04′17″N 67°02′50″W	Saint Andrews municipality (13544)	Q139799172	Upload Photo
Adam Smith Residence	124 Carleton Street; Saint Andrews NB	45°04′44″N 67°03′09″W	Saint Andrews municipality (13772)	Q139799204	Upload Photo
Gladstone Smith House	107 Queen Street; Saint Andrews NB	45°04′34″N 67°03′21″W	New Brunswick (5976)	Q112586739	Upload Photo
Snodgrass House	127 Water Street; Saint Andrews NB	45°04′30″N 67°03′21″W	Saint Andrews municipality (7806)	Q139799301	Upload Photo
Stevenson Residence	115 William Street; Saint Andrews NB	45°04′36″N 67°03′08″W	Saint Andrews municipality (12839)	Q139799307	Upload Photo
B. R. Stevenson's Office Building	255 Water Street; Saint Andrews NB	45°04′21″N 67°03′03″W	Saint Andrews municipality (13737)	Q139799316	Upload Photo
Stickney Residence	220 Montague Street; Saint Andrews NB	45°04′31″N 67°03′02″W	Saint Andrews municipality (16324)	Q139799329	Upload Photo
Stickney's Wedgwood Store	172 Water Street; Saint Andrews NB	45°04′27″N 67°03′14″W	Saint Andrews municipality (12928)	Q139799368	Upload Photo
Storr Residence	238 Parr Street; Saint Andrews NB	45°04′33″N 67°02′56″W	Saint Andrews municipality (16327)	Q139799379	Upload Photo
Street Building	225 Water Street; Saint Andrews NB	45°04′23″N 67°03′09″W	Saint Andrews municipality (8042)	Q139799397	Upload Photo
James W. Street Residence	102 Montague Street; Saint Andrews NB	45°04′38″N 67°03′18″W	Saint Andrews municipality (18242)	Q139799408	Upload Photo
George Swift Residence	84 Frederick Street; Saint Andrews NB	45°04′29″N 67°03′03″W	Saint Andrews municipality (13512)	Q139799418	Upload Photo
Glenn Thompson Residence	79 Adolphus Street; Saint Andrews NB	45°04′38″N 67°03′24″W	Saint Andrews municipality (16239)	Q139799424	Upload Photo
Tillietudlem	434 Bar Road; Saint Andrews NB	45°05′49″N 67°03′24″W	Saint Andrews municipality (13464)	Q139799456	Upload Photo
Treadwell House	294 Water Street; Saint Andrews NB	45°04′20″N 67°02′57″W	Saint Andrews municipality (13553)	Q139799676	Upload Photo
Villa St. Croix	4 Parr Street; Saint Andrews NB	45°04′48″N 67°03′29″W	Saint Andrews municipality (18221)	Q139799682	Upload Photo
John Watson Residence	132 Edward Street; Saint Andrews NB	45°04′40″N 67°03′12″W	Saint Andrews municipality (16277)	Q139799688	Upload Photo
Thomas Watt Residence	75 Queen Street; Saint Andrews NB	45°04′36″N 67°03′25″W	Saint Andrews municipality (18395)	Q139799697	Upload Photo
Windrose	94 King Street; Saint Andrews NB	45°04′32″N 67°03′07″W	Saint Andrews municipality (7923)	Q139799705	Upload Photo
Windsor House	132 Water Street; Saint Andrews NB	45°04′30″N 67°03′19″W	Saint Andrews municipality (7826)	Q139799714	Upload Photo
Wren Residence	327 Water Street; Saint Andrews NB	45°04′17″N 67°02′54″W	Saint Andrews municipality (13773)	Q139799746	Upload Photo
Capt. John Wren Residence	10 Queen Street; Saint Andrews NB	45°04′41″N 67°03′33″W	Saint Andrews municipality (17163)	Q139799756	Upload Photo

== See also ==
- List of historic places in Charlotte County, New Brunswick
- List of historic places in New Brunswick
- List of National Historic Sites of Canada in New Brunswick
