= Ross Memorial Museum =

Coordinates: 45°04′34″N 67°03′05″W

The Ross Memorial Museum is a personal decorative arts collection displayed in a fine early 19th-century house in the National Historic District of St. Andrews, New Brunswick, Canada. The museum and collection was left to the town of St. Andrews by its benefactors, Sarah Juliette Ross and her husband, Henry Phipps Ross.

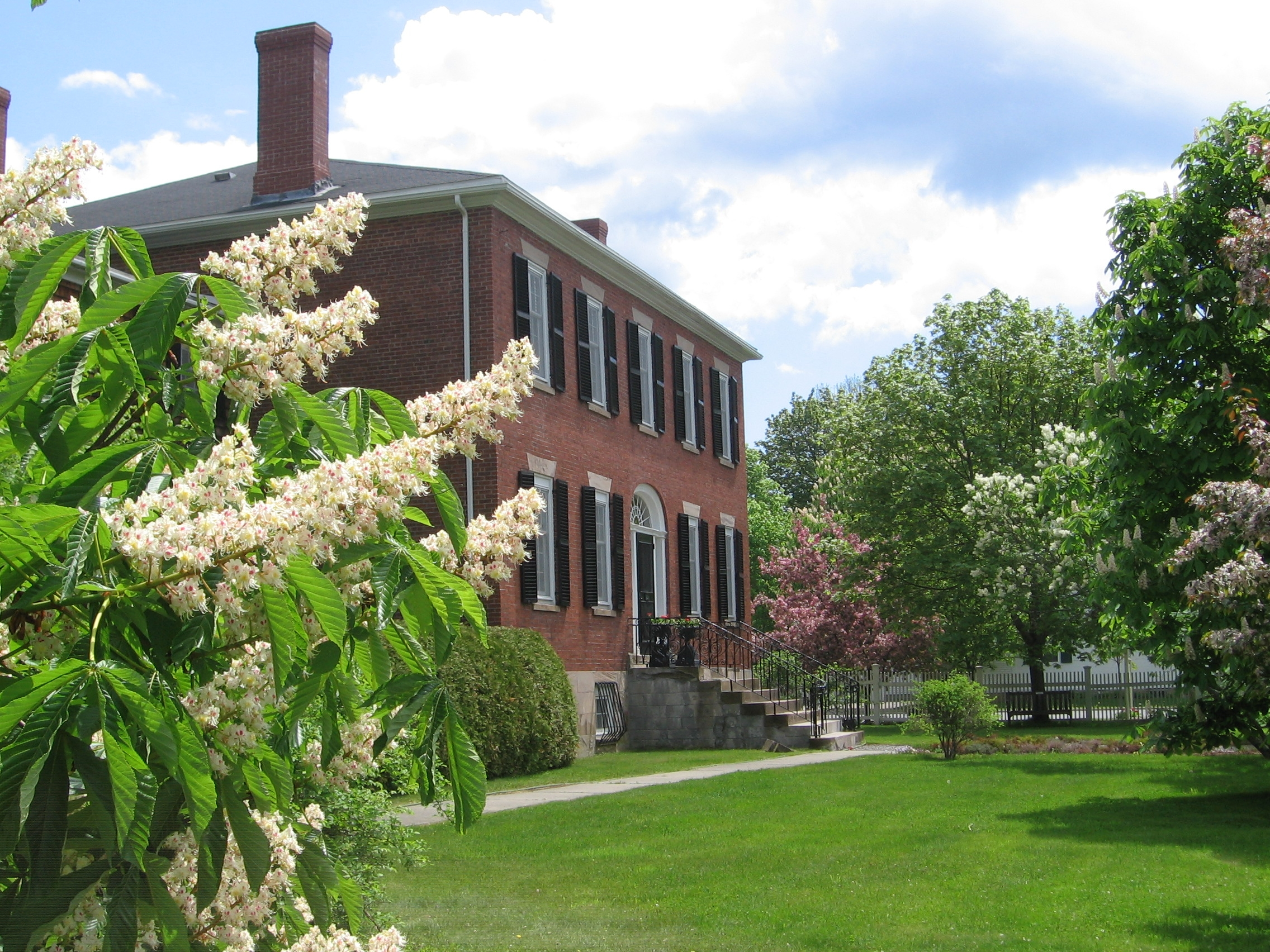
Built in 1824, the Ross Memorial Museum is in the centre of the St.Andrews National Historic District

== History ==
Henry Phipps Ross and his wife, Sarah Juliette Ross were Americans who visited St. Andrews in 1902 for a picnic and bought a house and estate in nearby Chamcook which they called Rossmont. Primarily used as a summer house, they spent several months of every year at Rossmont until 1945.

The Rosses were serious collectors and acquired numerous pieces of early 19th century New Brunswick furniture made by such cabinetmakers as Thomas Nisbet, Alexander Lawrence, Robert Chillas, John and Jonas Howe, Albert Lordly and Alban Emery.

Adventurous travellers, they took one of the first ‘around the world’ cruises in 1925, visited Asia and Africa in the 1930s and drove from New Brunswick to California in 1919. On all these trips they collected local artefacts which they took back to their home at Rossmont. Oriental carpets were a special interest of the Rosses and the museum’s collection is quite extensive.

The Rosses had many artist friends in California where they lived for some time. The work of artists such as Mary Curtis Richardson, William Raymond Eaton, William Posey Silva, and Edith Maguire are well represented. George Horne Russell, the Montreal artist who had a studio in St. Andrews, was a close friend and many of his paintings are in the collection.

In 1938, the Rosses purchased Chestnut Hall in the centre of St. Andrews. They never lived in the substantial brick Georgian house built by the Hon. Harris Hatch in 1824 but bought it with the sole intention of it becoming a museum of their collection.

In 1945, Juliette and Henry Ross both died within a few days of each other. In their wills they provided for many friends and staff, and when those bequests ran their course the second part of the will came into effect. This resulted in the Ross Memorial Museum being opened in 1980, the Ross Memorial Library being built behind the museum, and the Ross Memorial Wing being built on the hospital in nearby St. Stephen.

== Interpretation ==
Interpretation of the collection and the story of the Rosses is done through personal guided tours, information panels which highlight artefacts in each of the rooms, self-guiding brochures on aspects of the collection and an exhibit featuring photographs, a film of the Rosses' travels and objets d'art from around the world.

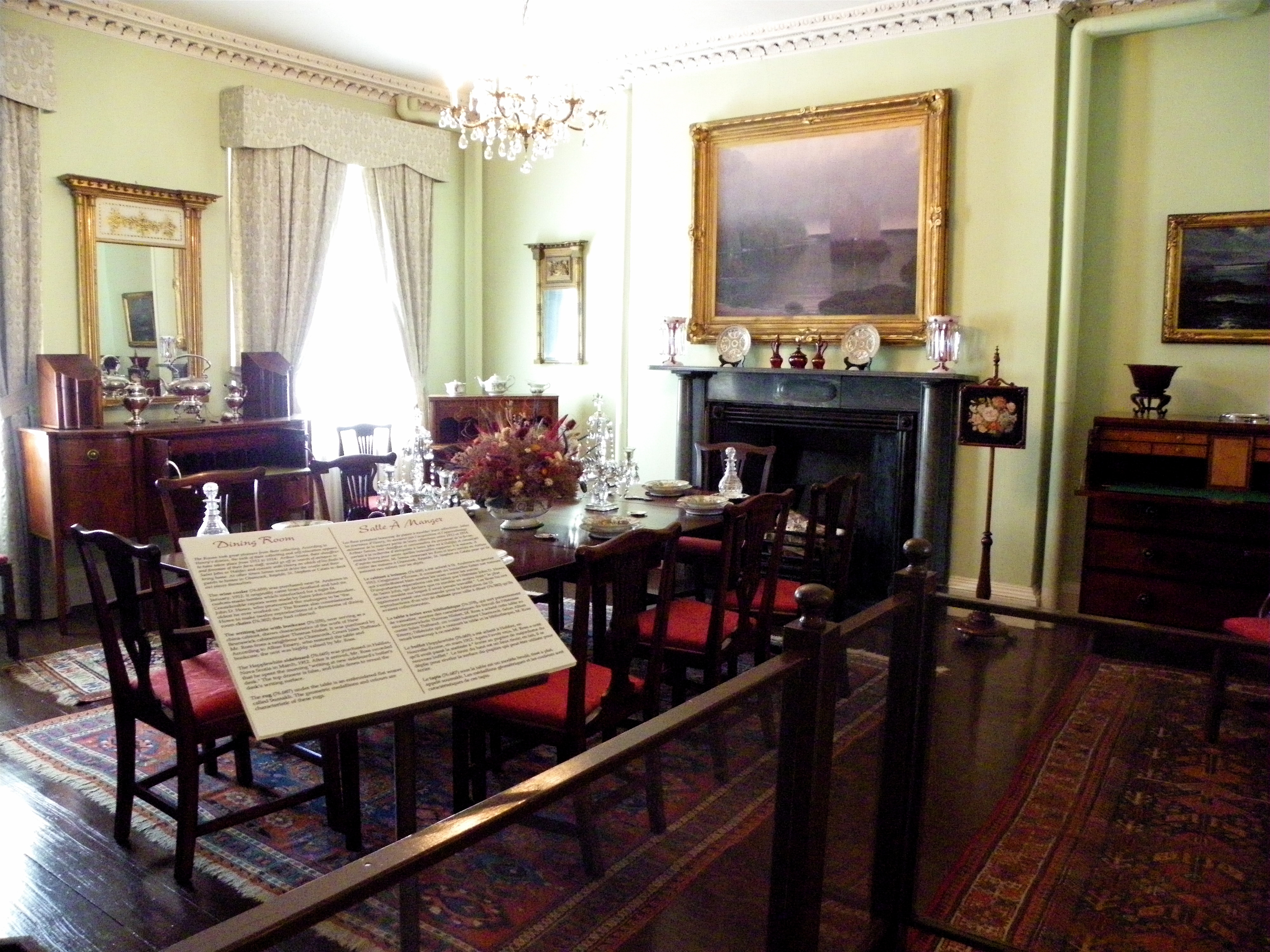
19th century New Brunswick furniture and paintings by Canadian and California artists in the dining room of the Ross Memorial Museum

== Special events ==
Annual open house receptions 2-4pm, Canada Day and New Brunswick Day. Christmas Open House four days in early December. Check official website for specific dates.

== Alliances ==
- FundyCulture Museum Network
- Canadian Museums Association
- Association Museums New Brunswick
- Canadian Heritage Information Network
