= St. Andrews Blockhouse =

Blockhouse in New Brunswick, Canada

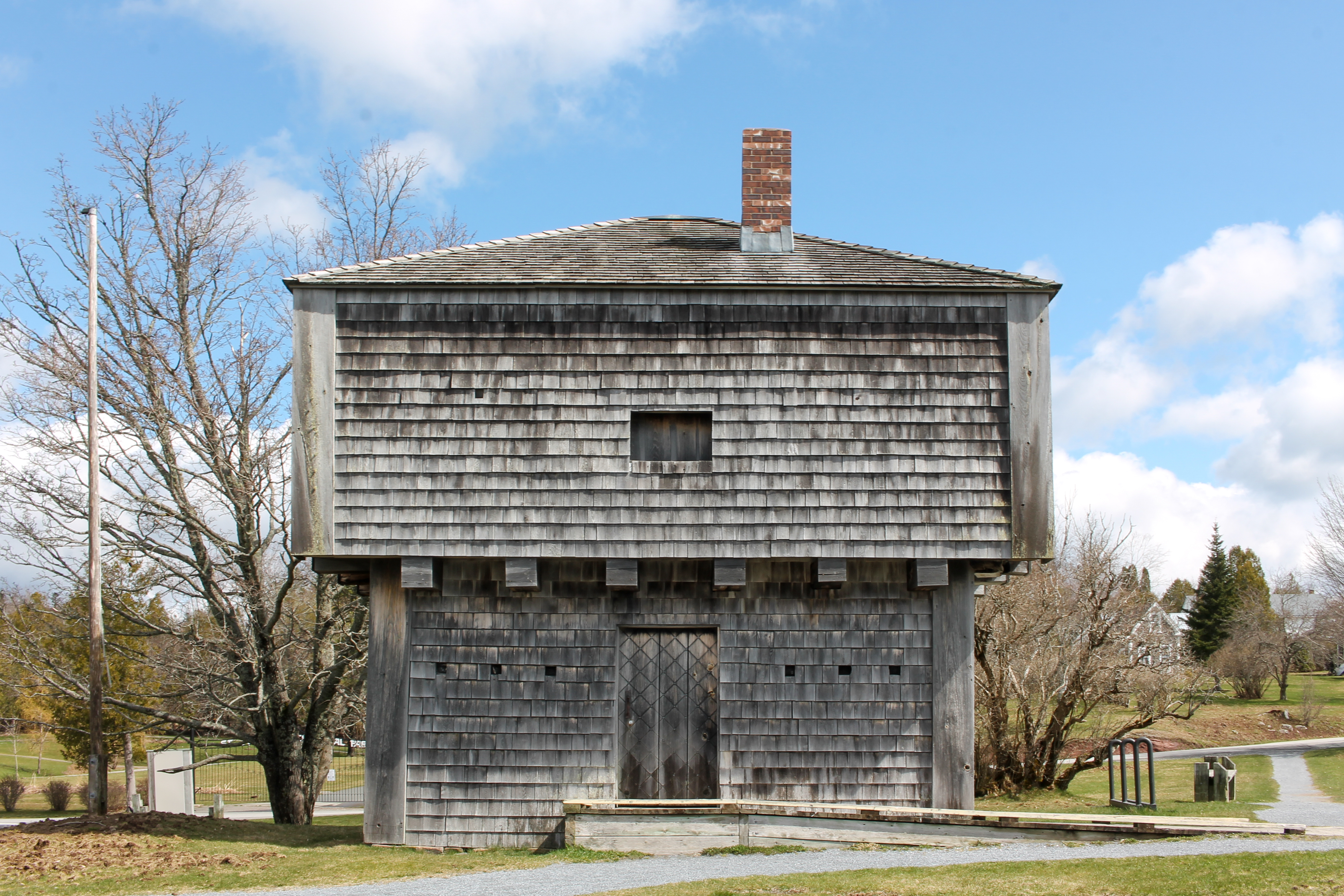
- Interactive map of St. Andrews Blockhouse
- Coordinates: 45°4′37.51″N 67°3′42.81″W
- Location: Saint Andrews, New Brunswick; NB E5B 2J7

History
- Built: 1812–1813
- Original use: Blockhouse

National Historic Site of Canada
- Official name: St. Andrews Blockhouse National Historic Site of Canada
- Designated: 15 May 1962
- Reference no.: 7486

The St. Andrews Blockhouse is a blockhouse fortification in Saint Andrews, New Brunswick, Canada. Built by nearby residents between 1812 and 1813 during the War of 1812, it was one of three blockhouses built by locals to protect the area from American raids. Standing by the St. Andrews waterfront, the St. Andrews Blockhouse is Canada's last surviving blockhouse from the war, and is a registered National Historic Site of Canada.

== Description ==
The St. Andrews Blockhouse is located in Saint Andrews in Charlotte County, New Brunswick. Sitting along the town's waterfront, it is the last War of 1812-dated blockhouse in Canada. During the war, a total of three blockhouses were built by locals. The blockhouse was further used as defense in the 1860s when tensions temporarily rose between Canada and the United States.

== See also ==
- Fort Howe, a blockhouse in Saint John
