= Saint Andrews, New Brunswick =

Saint Andrews
- Town
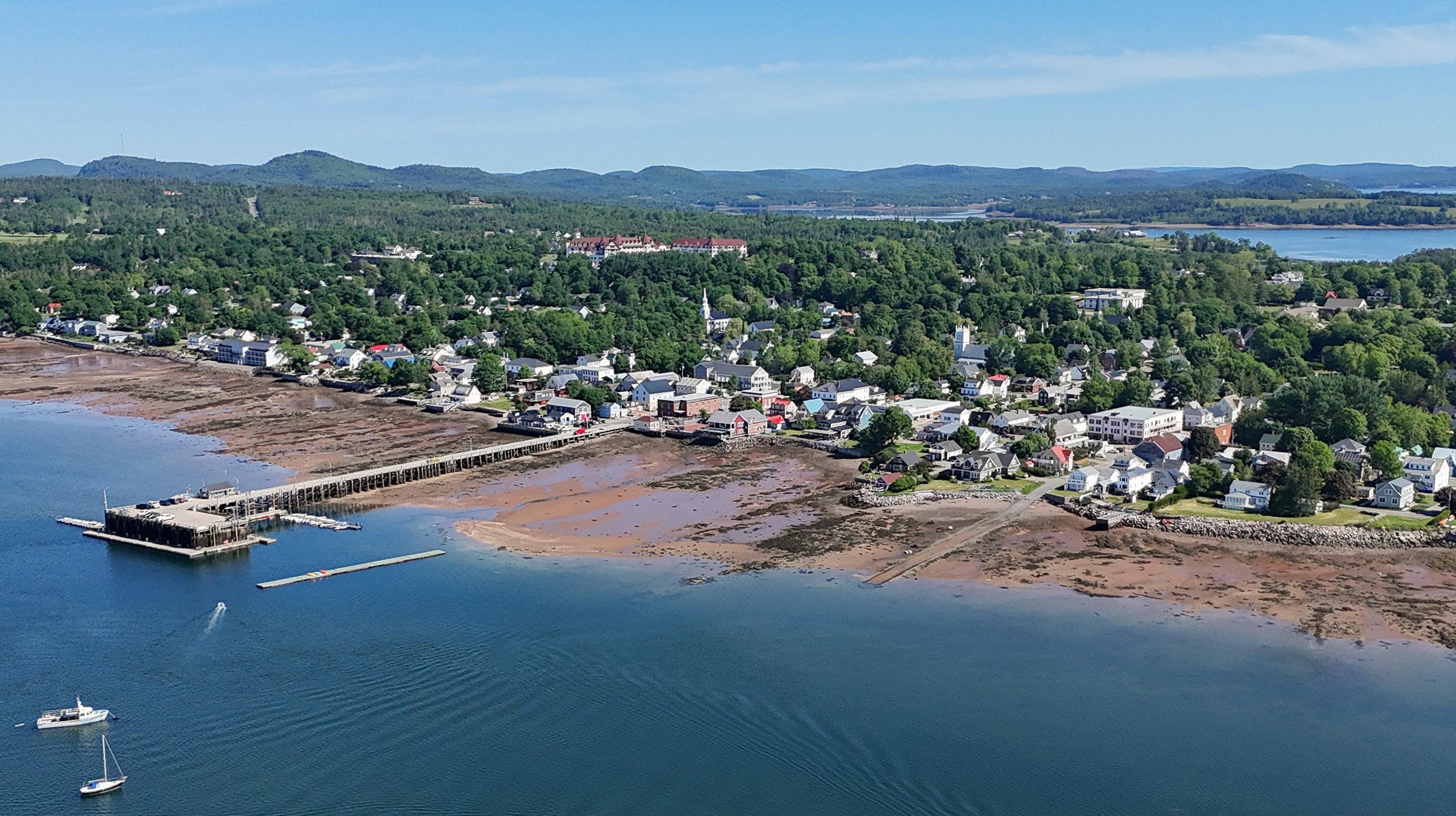
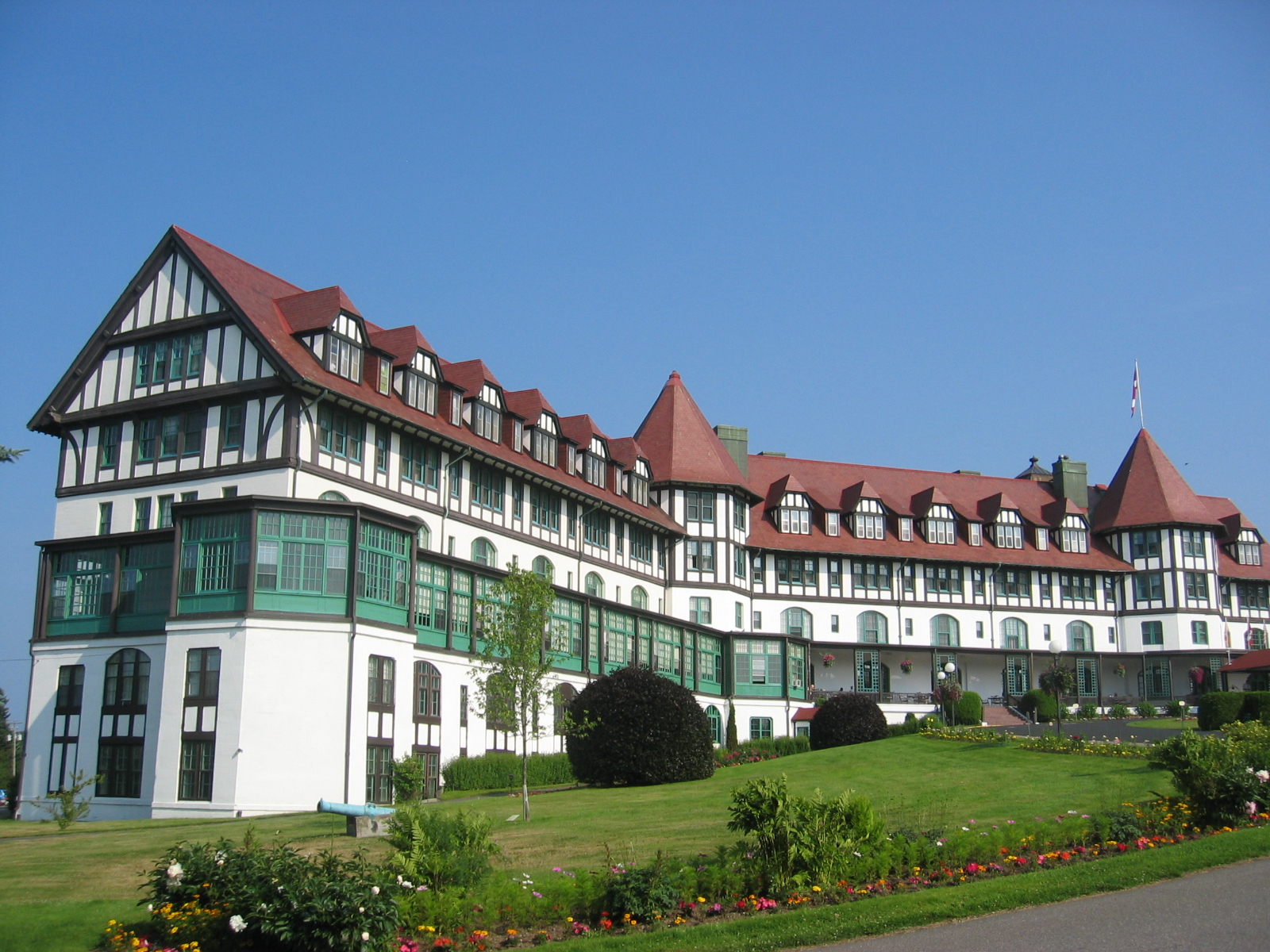
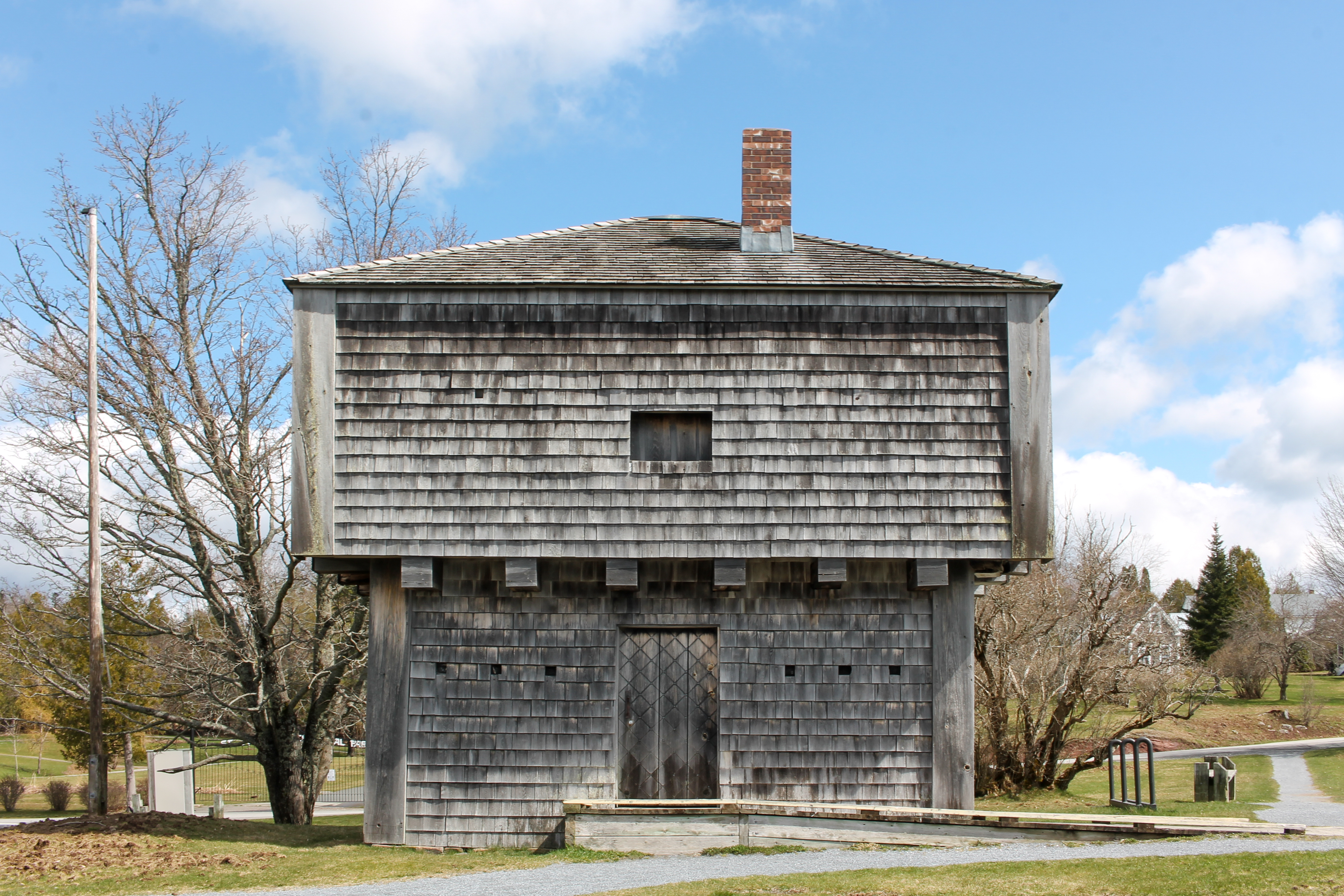
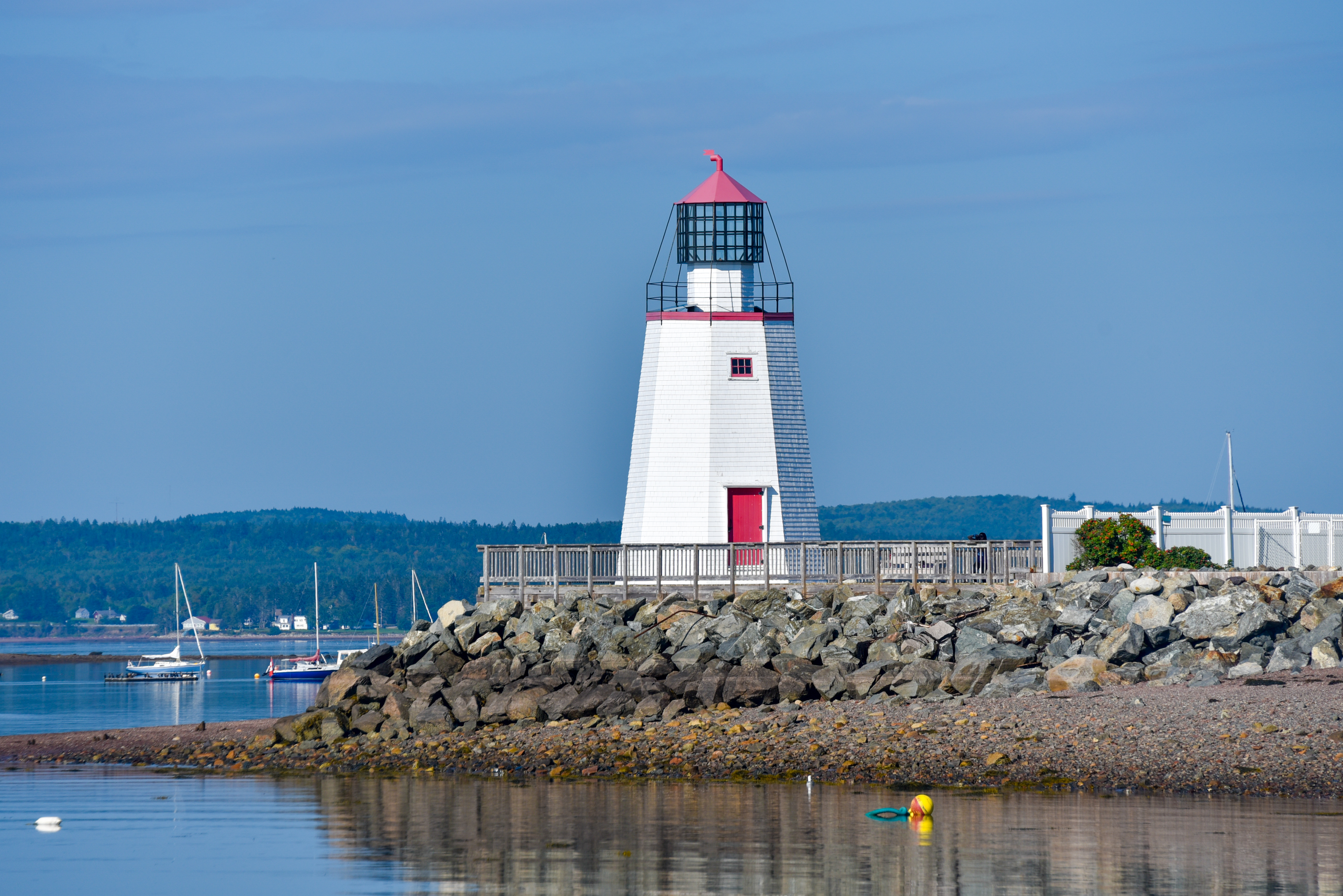
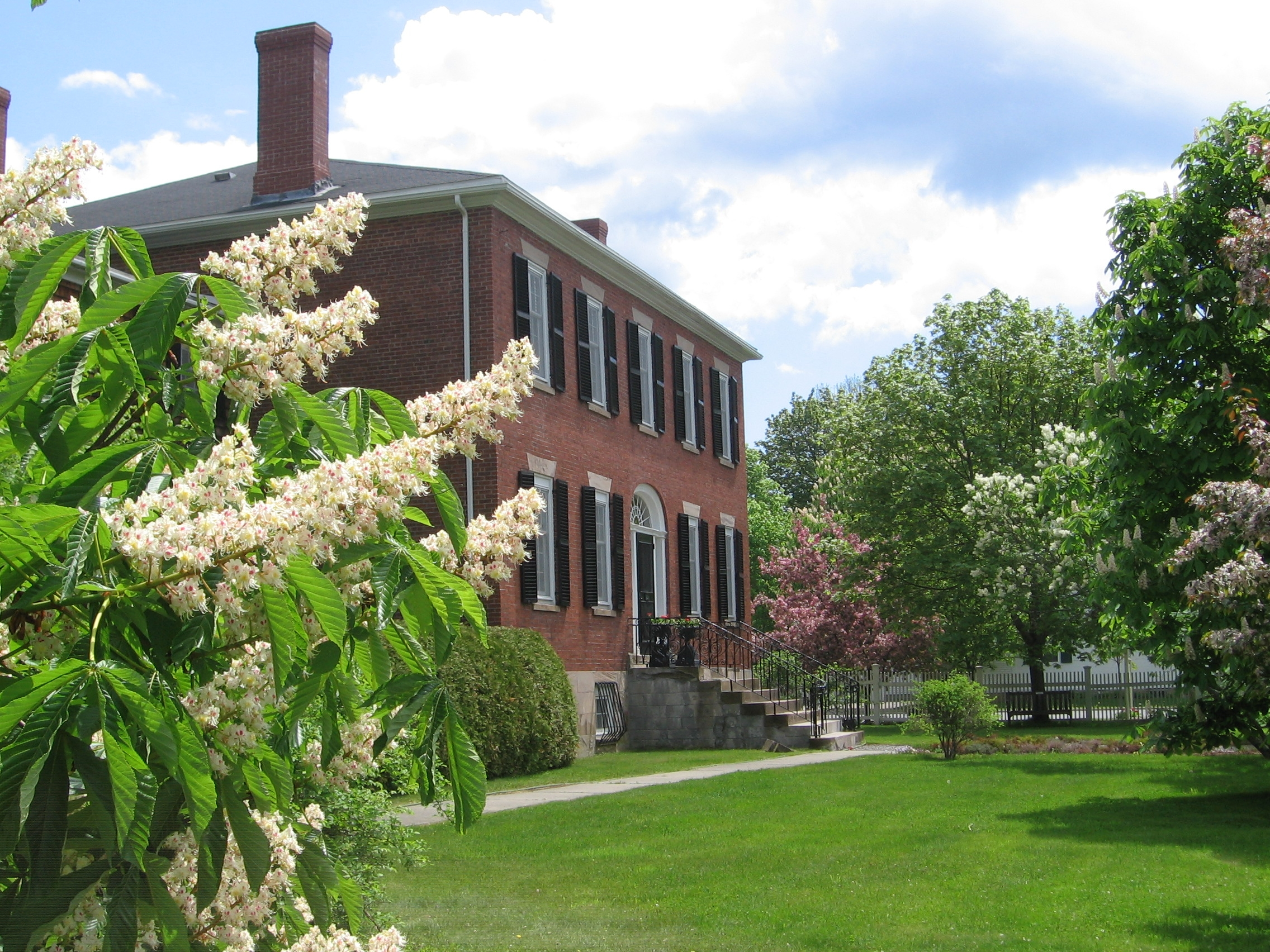
- Aerial view Algonquin Resort Blockhouse North Point Lighthouse Ross Memorial Museum
- Nickname: Saint Andrews By-the-Sea
- Location within New Brunswick
- Coordinates: 45.07399°N 67.05209°W
- Country: Canada
- Province: New Brunswick
- County: Charlotte
- Settled: 1783
- Incorporated: 1903
- Named for: Saint Andrew's Day

Government
  - Type: New Brunswick Municipality
  - Mayor: Steve Neil
  - Councillors: Annette Harland, Darrell Weare
  - CAO: Chris Spear

Area
  - Land: 8.35 km^{2} (3.22 sq mi)

Population (2021)
  - Total: 2,048
  - Density: 245.3/km^{2} (635/sq mi)
  - Change (2016–21): ▲14.7%
- Time zone: UTC-4 (Atlantic (AST))
  - Summer (DST): UTC-3 (ADT)
- Canadian Postal code: E5B
- Area code: 506
- Telephone Exchange: 529
- NTS Map: 21G3 St. Stephen
- GNBC Code: DAEBC
- Website: townofstandrews.ca

Saint Andrews is a town in Charlotte County, New Brunswick, Canada. The historic town is a national historic site of Canada, bearing many characteristics of a typical 18th century British colonial settlement, including the original grid layout with its market square, and the classical architecture.

Although often shortened in non-official sources to St. Andrews, the town's legal name is spelt Saint Andrews, and appears as such on the town's website; St. Andrews by-the-Sea is a brand used for tourism purposes by the local Chamber of Commerce.

On 1 January 2023, Saint Andrews annexed the local service district of Bayside and Chamcook. Revised census information has not yet been released.

== History ==
The site of the town was named Qunnnoskwamk'ook, meaning "long gravel bar" in the Maliseet-Passamaquoddy language. The present name was given by a French missionary who landed at the site on Saint Andrew's Day. At the eastern end the town is a midden, a pile of shells and other refuse that accumulated over 2,000 years due to year-round activity of the Passamaquoddy. Today it is a provincial heritage site.

The site was settled in 1783 by United Empire Loyalists. The town's street grid was designed by Charles Morris and was laid out at that time and persists today. Except for the shoreline Water Street, the names of streets have royal or colonial associations: (Parr Street, Carleton Street and Montague Street are all named after governors. These streets cross thirteen named after the children of King George III.). Also typical of British colonial settlement of the time are the town's defensive sites, public spaces, and delineation.

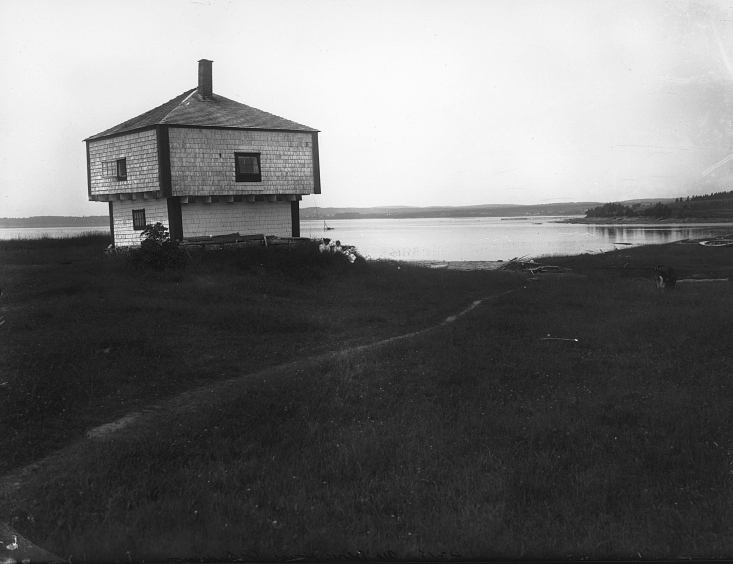
The St. Andrews Blockhouse was built during the War of 1812 and is now a national historic site.

Between 1820 and 1860, the port of Saint Andrews welcomed Irish immigrants. They were first quarantined at Hospital Island, in Passamaquoddy Bay. At the 1851 census, more than 50% of the town's population had been born in Ireland.

The Pendlebury Lighthouse, also known as the St. Andrews North Point Lighthouse, was built in 1833 at the tip of the peninsula. Deactivated in 1938, it has since been restored and registered as a Canadian historic place.

In 1840, the Charlotte County Court House was built, and was used continually until 2016.

In the late 1800s and early 1900s, St. Andrews became a seaside resort for people from Montreal and Boston who were seeking to escape the summer heat. The town's first seaside hotel, the Argyll, opened in 1881. It was followed in 1889 by The Algonquin, a resort on a hill overlooking the town, which became Canada's first seaside resort. The Argyll burned down in 1892 and was never rebuilt while the Algonquin burned in 1914 and was rebuilt one year later. The lifestyle of wealthy summer visitors is commemorated at the Ross Memorial Museum.

A federal marine research facility, the St. Andrews Biological Station, was established in 1908 and the Huntsman Marine Science Centre in 1969.

The town's historic district was designated a National Historic Site of Canada in 1995.

Historical population

Year	Pop.	±%
1901	1,064	—
1911	987	−7.2%
1921	1,065	+7.9%
1931	1,207	+13.3%
1941	1,167	−3.3%
1951	1,458	+24.9%
1961	1,531	+5.0%
1981	1,760	+15.0%

Year	Pop.	±%
1986	1,612	−8.4%
1991	1,652	+2.5%
1996	1,752	+6.1%
2001	1,869	+6.7%
2006	1,798	−3.8%
2011	1,889	+5.1%
2016	1,786	−5.5%

== Geography ==
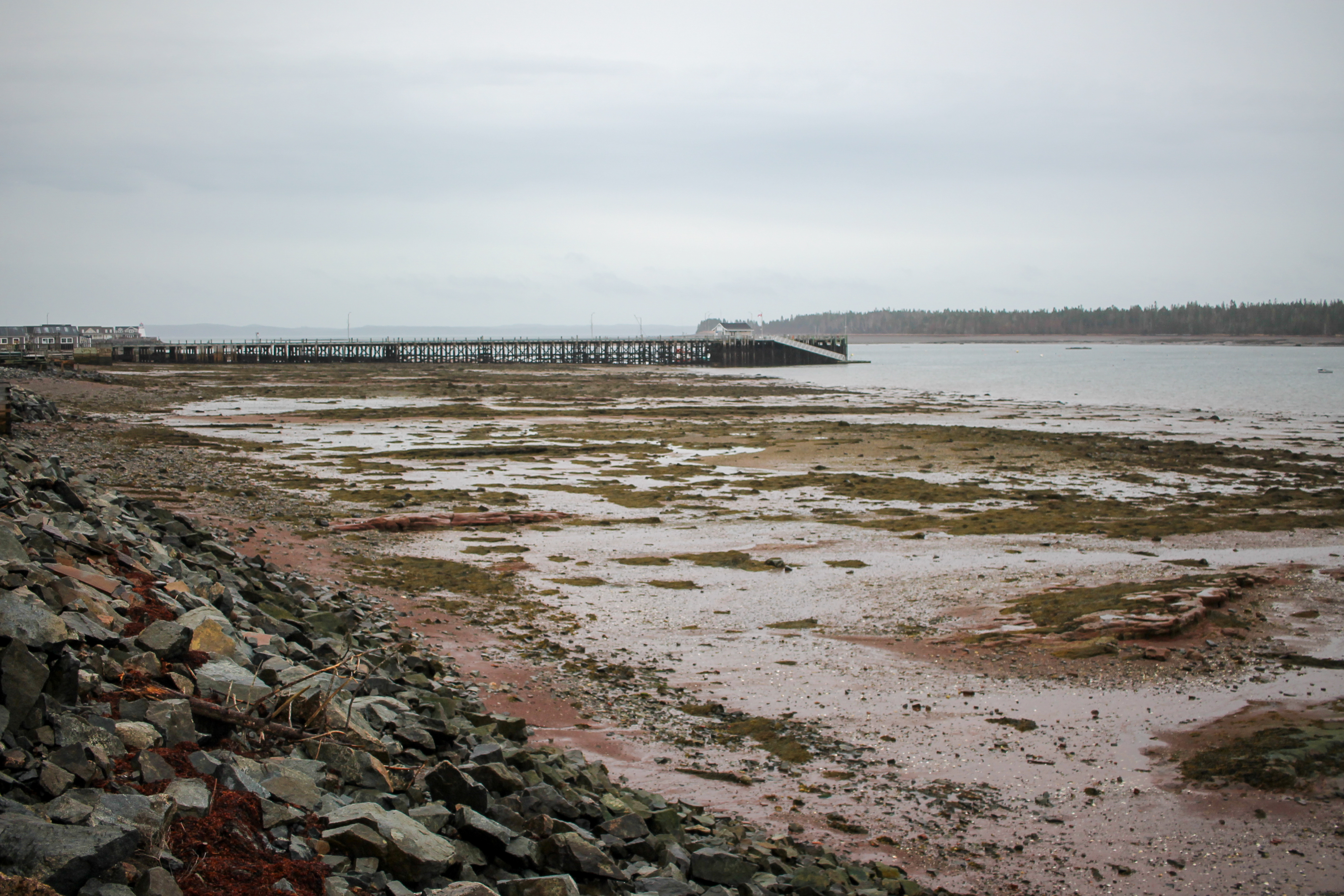
St. Andrews Harbour at low tide.

Saint Andrews is at the southern tip of a peninsula, extending into Passamaquoddy Bay. The waterfront faces Saint Andrews Harbour and the Western Channel, which is formed by Navy Island. The harbour is at the mouth of the St. Croix River.

The town is directly opposite the community of Robbinston, Maine, two kilometres to the west across the river mouth, and 53 km by road.

Ministers Island is east of the town and is accessible by road at low tide only.

St. Andrews

Climate chart (precipitation, max. and min. temperature)
J	F	M	A	M	J	J	A	S	O	N	D
109 −2 −11	91 −1 −11	90 3 −5	90 9 0	97 15 5	84 20 9	77 23 12	83 23 12	97 19 9	104 13 4	127 7 0	121 0 −8
- █ Average max. and min. temperatures in °C
- █ Precipitation totals in mm
- Source: climate-data.org
Imperial conversion
J	F	M	A	M	J	J	A	S	O	N	D
4.3 28 12	3.6 30 12	3.5 37 23	3.5 48 32	3.8 59 41	3.3 68 48	3 73 54	3.3 73 54	3.8 66 48	4.1 55 39	5 45 32	4.8 32 18
- █ Average max. and min. temperatures in °F
- █ Precipitation totals in inches

== Demographics ==
In the 2021 Census of Population conducted by Statistics Canada, Saint Andrews had a population of 2,048 living in 921 of its 1,096 total private dwellings, a change of 14.7% from its 2016 population of 1,786. With a land area of 8.35 km^{2} (3.22 sq mi), it had a population density of 245.3/km^{2} (635.2/sq mi) in 2021.

== Transportation ==
Despite its proximity to the Canada–United States border, the nearest border crossings are 30 km away at St. Stephen or via a ferry service at Deer Island, both in New Brunswick.

The only way into or out of Saint Andrews by land is via Route 127, which runs directly through the town. It meets Route 1 on either end of the town.

== Media ==
A local community channel, CHCO-TV, serves the Saint Andrews and Charlotte County area. The station launched in 1993 on cable television, and began broadcasting over the air in 2006.

== Education ==
- NBCC St. Andrews
- Vincent Massey Elementary School (K-5)
- Sir James Dunn Academy (6-12)

== Gallery ==
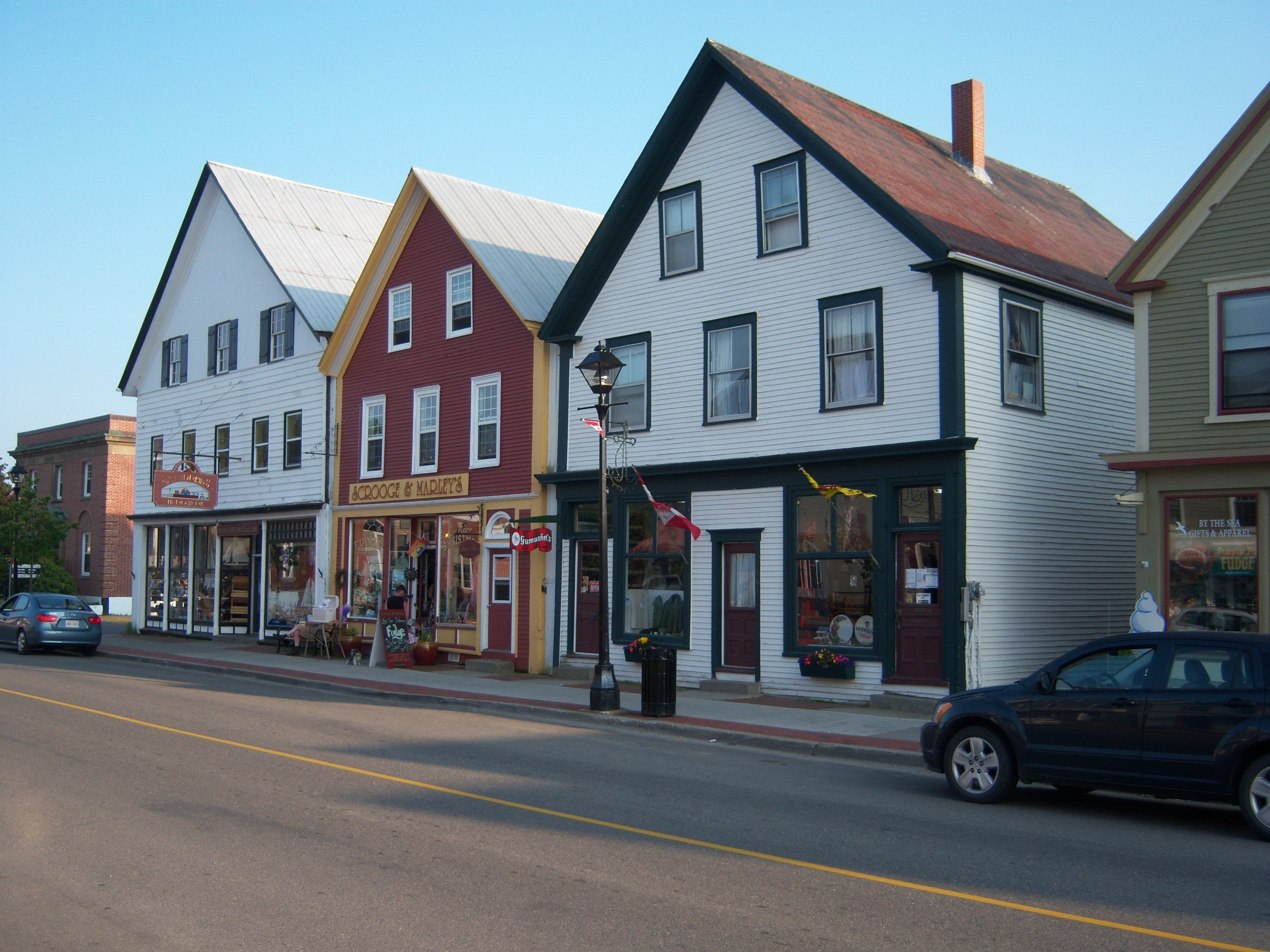
Historic town centre

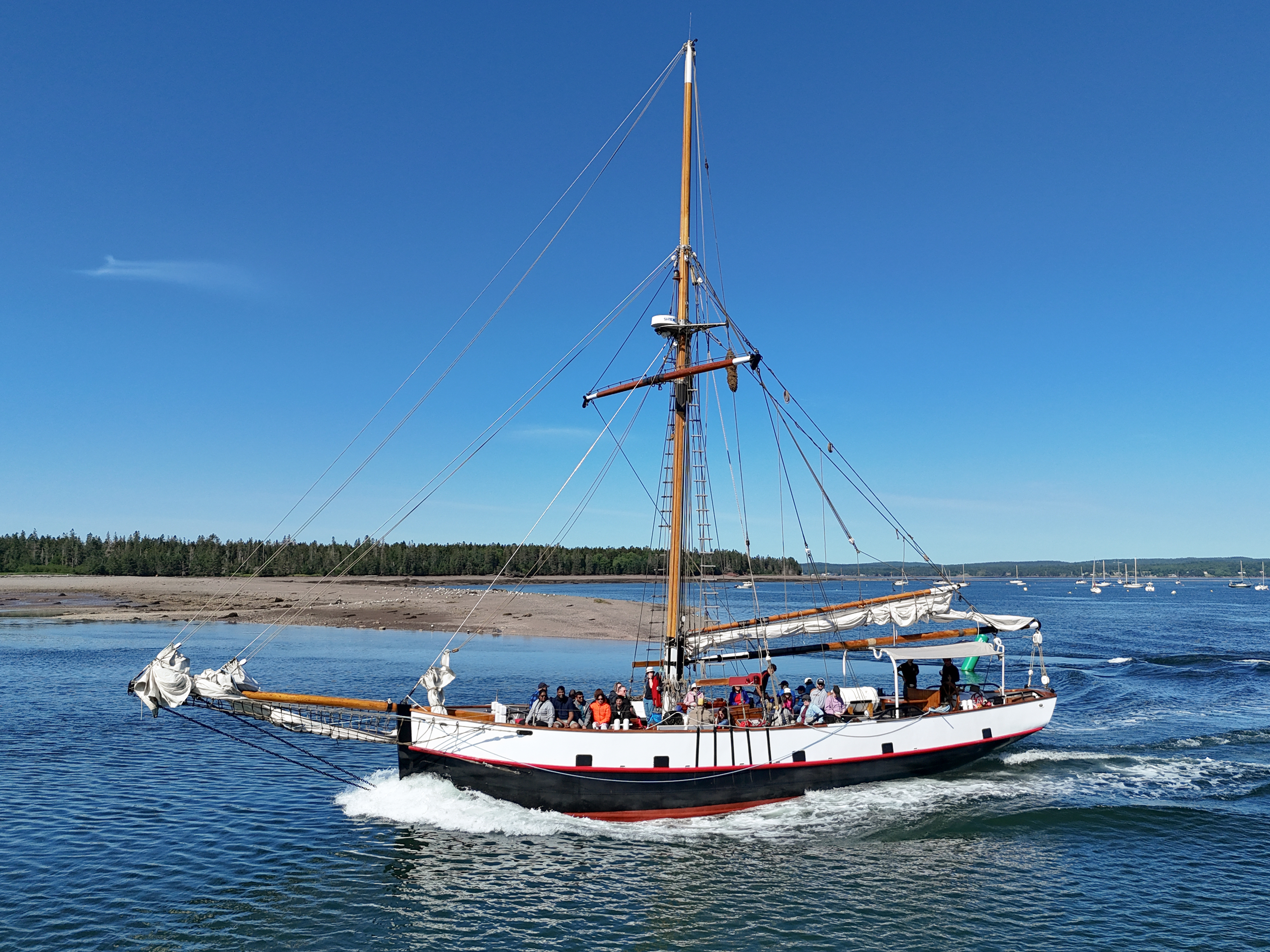
Jolly Breeze whale watching ship

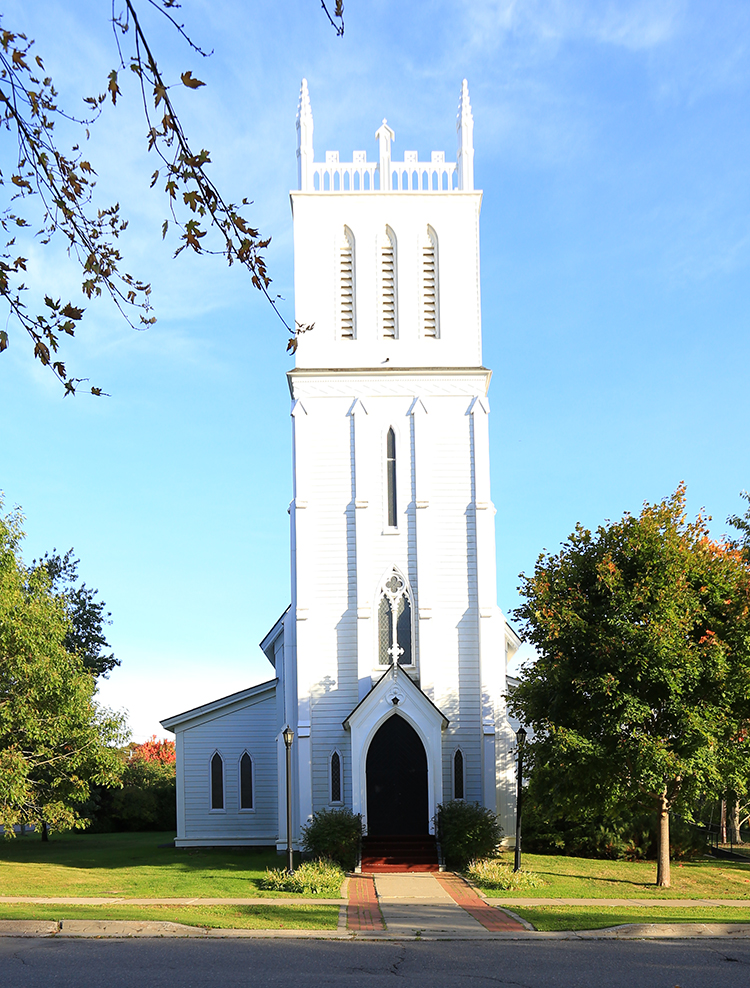
All Saints Anglican Church is the oldest established church in town proper limits.

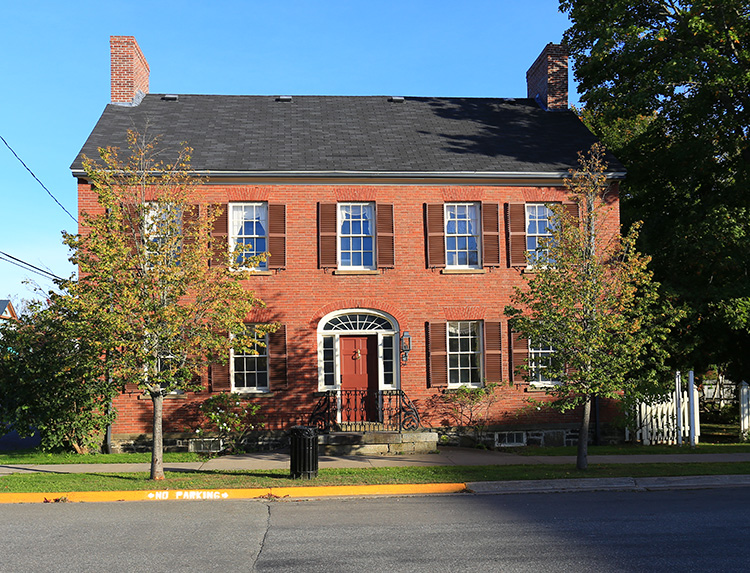
Sheriff Andrews House, a museum

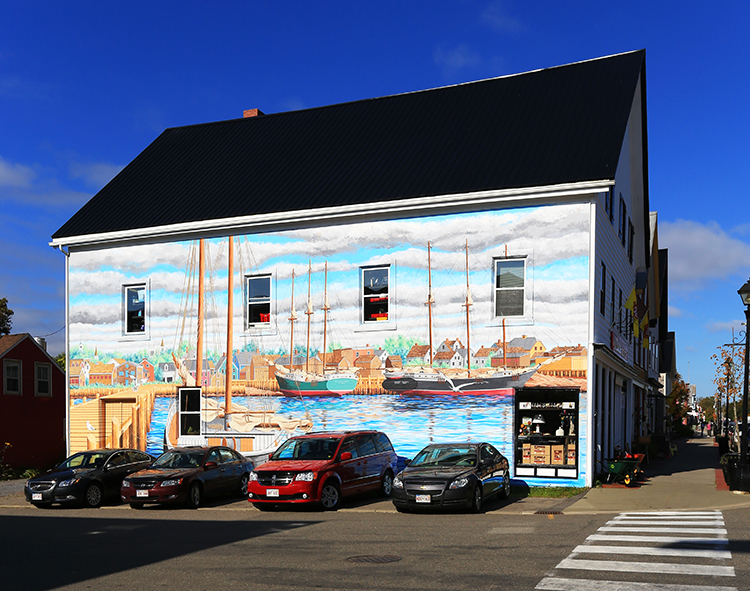
Saint Andrews features many outdoor murals

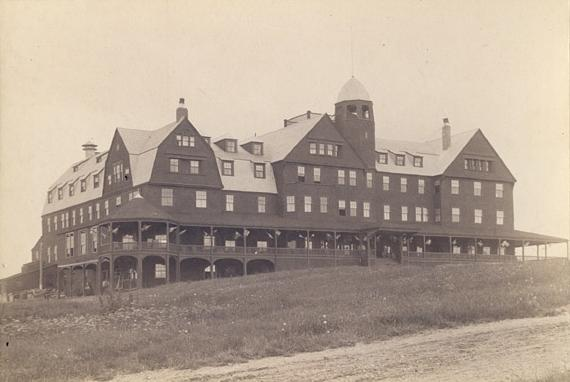
The original Algonquin Hotel, one of New Brunswick's most prominent hotels

== See also ==
- List of historic places in St. Andrews
- List of people from Charlotte County
