= St. Andrews North Point Lighthouse =

Lighthouse in St. Andrews, New Brunswick, Canada

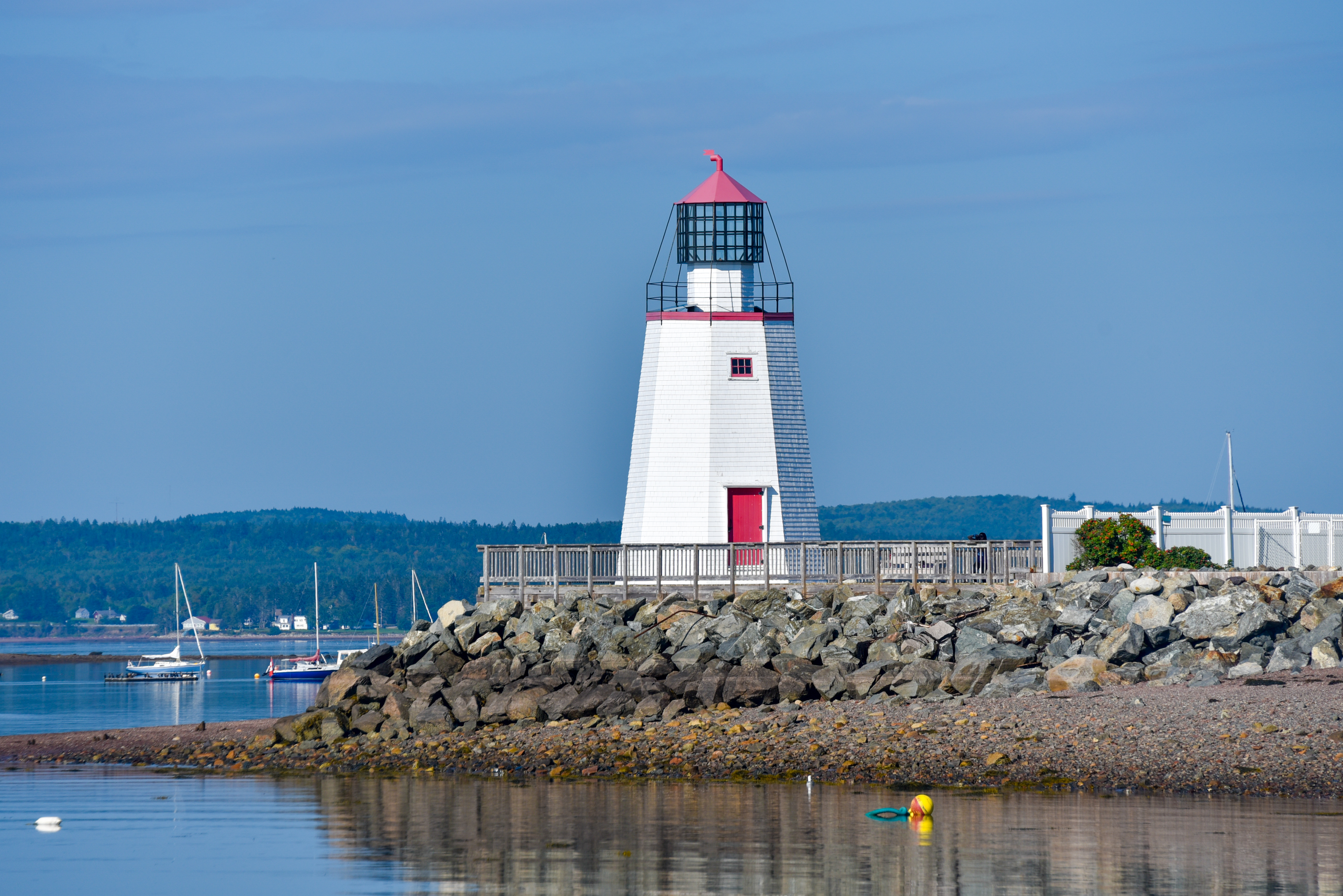
- St. Andrews Lighthouse in August, 2021
- Location: Saint Andrews, New Brunswick, Canada
- Coordinates: 45°04′06″N 67°03′02″W

Tower
- Constructed: 1833 (first)
- Construction: wooden tower (first) metal skeletal tower (current)
- Height: 9 metres (30 ft) (first); 11.9 metres (39 ft) (current)
- Shape: octagonal pyramidal with balcony and lantern (first) quadrangular skeletal tower (current)
- Markings: white tower, red lantern (first) red tower (current)
- Power source: solar power
- Operator: Town of St. Andrews

Light
- Deactivated: 1938 (first)
- Focal height: 7 metres (23 ft) (current)
- Range: 4 nautical miles (7.4 km; 4.6 mi)
- Characteristic: Fl R 4s

The St. Andrews North Point Lighthouse is an active lighthouse in St. Andrews, New Brunswick on the southern tip of the peninsula in the Passamaquoddy Bay; it is commonly known as Pendlebury Lighthouse from the name of the family who took care of it.

== History ==
The first lighthouse was built in 1833 and consisted of a white wooden octagonal pyramidal tower with balcony and red lantern. In 1840 the foundation were secured and the lantern was changed because it was deemed to be unfit. In 1842 John Pendlebury was transferred from Machias Seal Island to become the second keeper of the lighthouse, beginning a family dynasty of keepers until 1938 when the light was decommissioned.

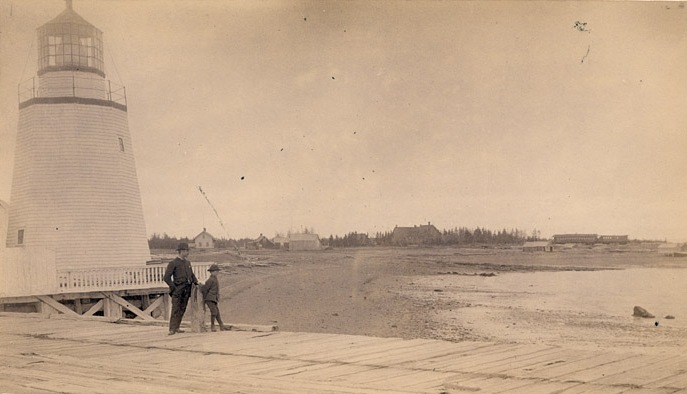
St. Andrews Lighthouse in 1895.

The active lighthouse is 75 metres (246 ft) offshore, white quadrangular metal skeletal tower 11.9 metres (39 ft) high on concrete base. The light is positioned at 7 metres (23 ft) above sea level and emits one red flash in a 4 seconds period visible up to a distance of 4 nautical miles (7.4 km; 4.6 mi). The old lighthouse is managed by St. Andrews Civic Trust Inc.

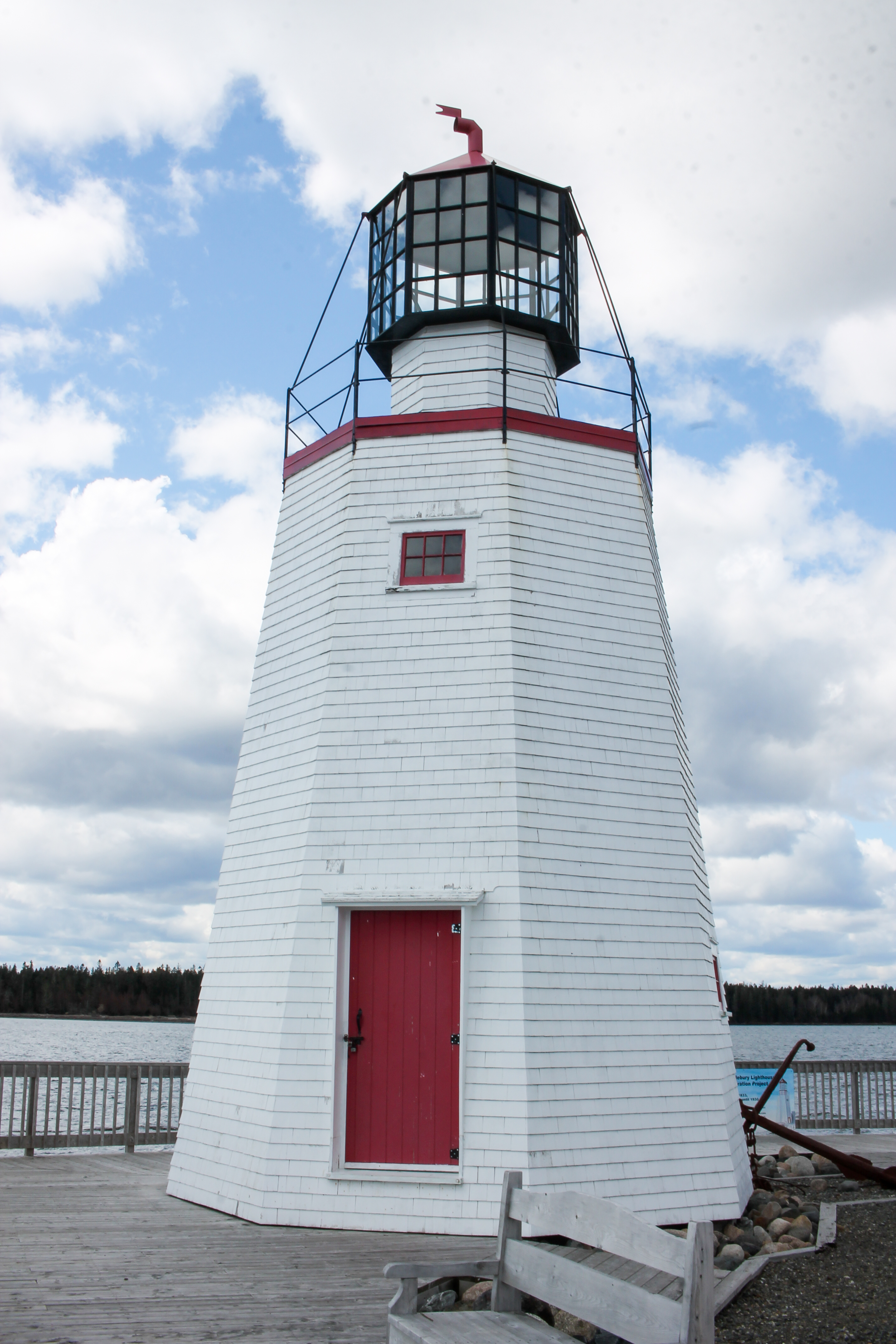
The decommissioned lighthouse in 2022.

== Keepers ==
- James Smith (1833 – 1842)
- John Pendlebury (1842 – 1855)
- George A. Pendlebury (1855 – 1889)
- William J. Pendlebury (1889 – 1916)
- Mary A. Pendlebury (1916)
- Emma Pendlebury (1917 – 1938)

== See also ==
- List of lighthouses in New Brunswick
- List of lighthouses in Canada
