= Ministers Island =

Tidal island in New Brunswick, Canada

- Quanoscumcook (Malecite-Passamaquoddy)
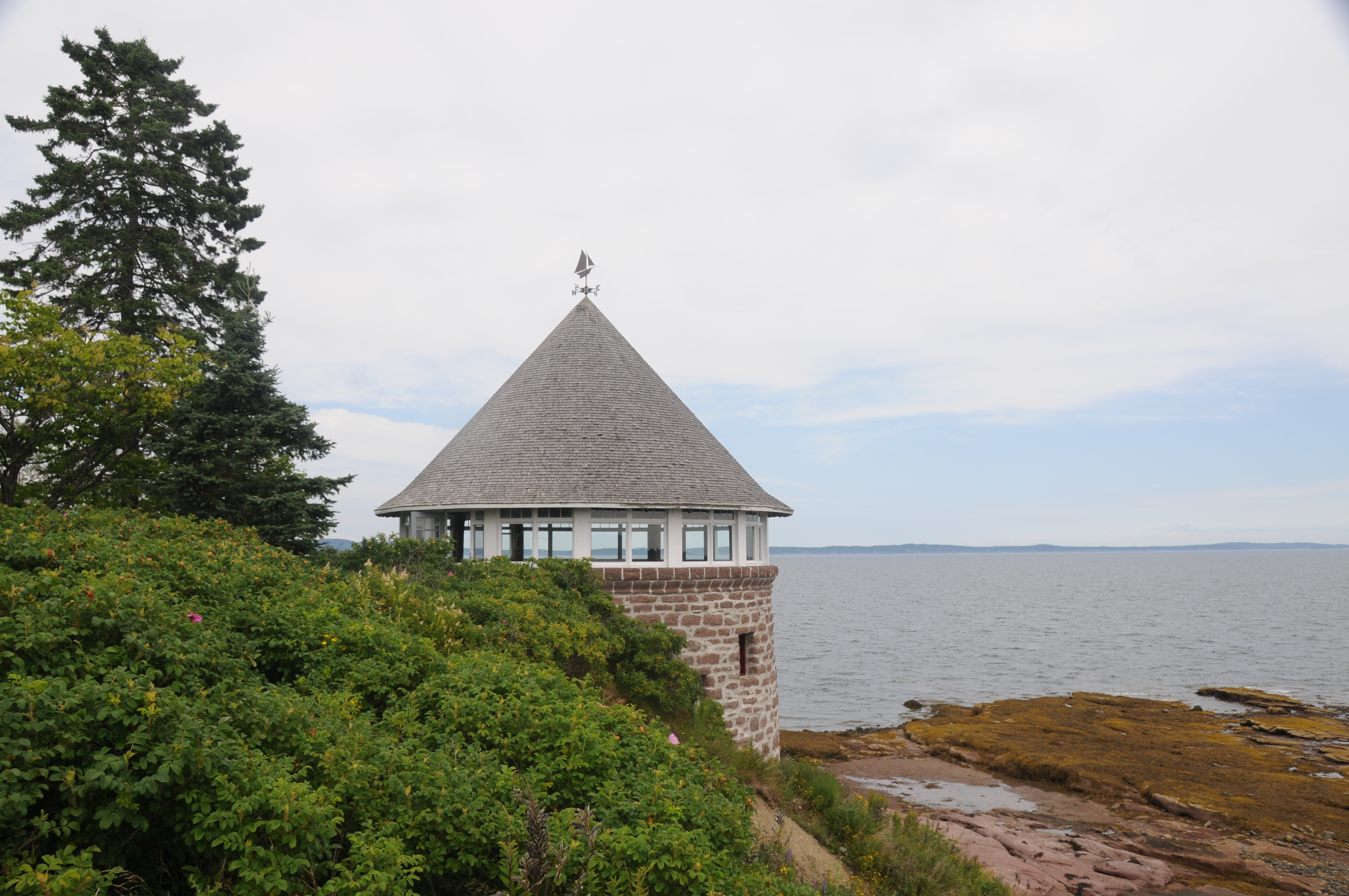

- Location within Canada
- 45°06′25″N 67°02′30″W
- Location: St. Andrews, New Brunswick, Canada

History
- Built: 1892-1901

Site notes
- Elevation: 50 metres (160 ft)
- Area: 2.8 km^{2} (1.1 mi^{2})
- Architect(s): Sir William Van Horne; Edward Maxwell
- Restored: 2006-present
- Restored by: Van Horne Estate on Ministers Island
- Governing body: Province of New Brunswick

National Historic Site of Canada

Ministers Island is an historic Canadian tidal island in New Brunswick's Passamaquoddy Bay near the town of St. Andrews.

The 200-hectare (490-acre) island stands several hundred metres offshore immediately northeast of the town and is a geographical novelty in that it is accessible at low tide by a wide gravel bar suitable for vehicular travel.

Ministers Island became famous in the last decade of the nineteenth century as the summer home of Sir William Van Horne, the president of the Canadian Pacific Railway. By the time of Van Horne's death in 1915, the island had been transformed into a small Xanadu, sporting a sandstone mansion furnished in the most lavish late Edwardian manner, manicured grounds, scenic roads, greenhouses turning out exotic fruits and vegetables, as well as a breeding farm producing prize-winning Clydesdale horses and Lakenvelder cattle. It was the most spectacular of many palatial summer homes in St. Andrews, which since the creation of the St. Andrews Land Company in 1888 and the arrival of Van Horne in 1891, had become a watering place of note on the Canadian east coast.

== Pre-Columbian era ==
Consquamcook or Quanoscumcook Island had been inhabited by Passamaquoddy centuries earlier, traces of their occupation evidenced by the presence of shell middens. Today the Ministers Island Pre-Columbian ("pre-contact") shell middens are designated as a National Historic Site and commemorated by a cairn.

== Early settlement ==
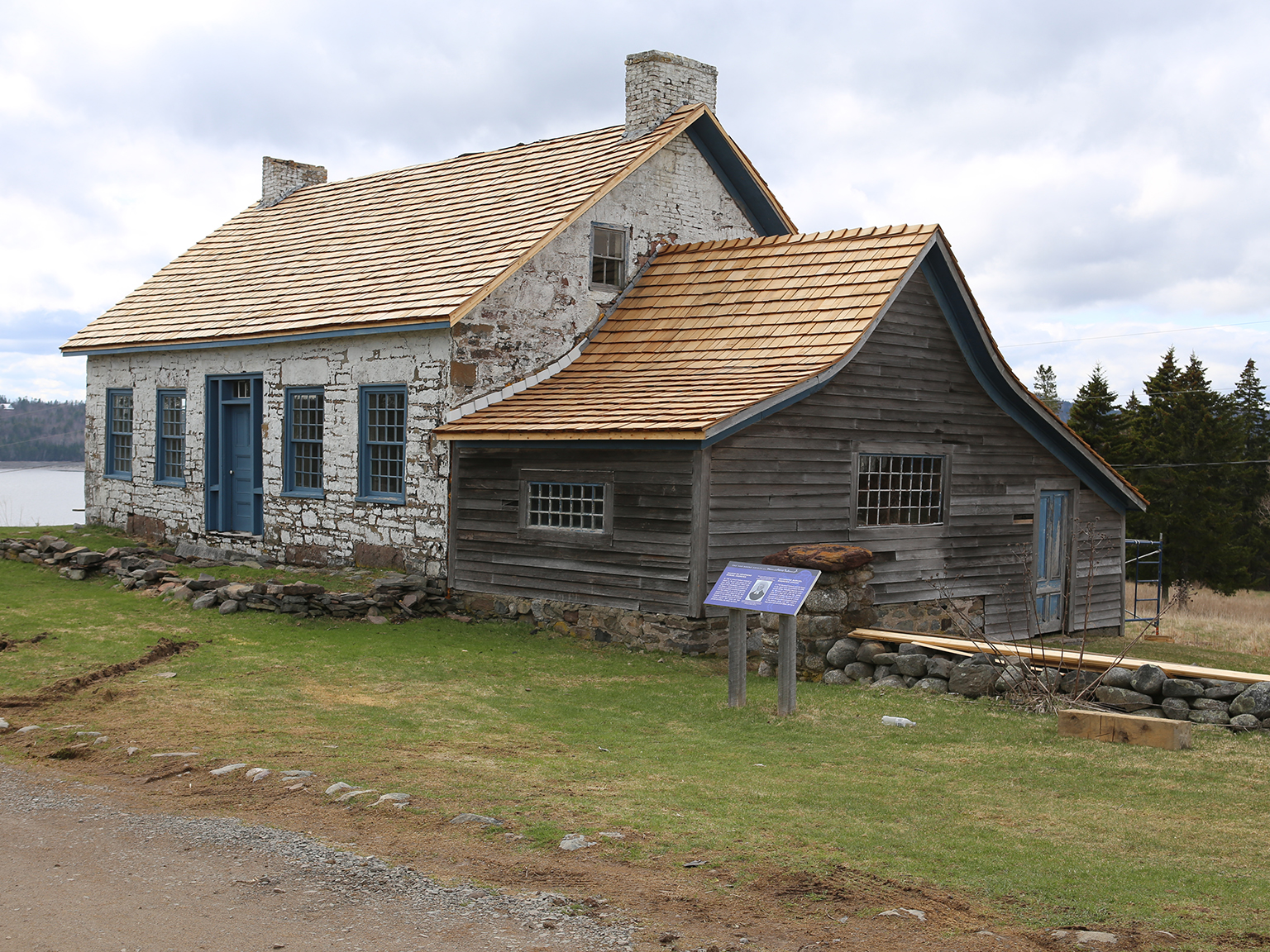
Home of Rev. Samuel Andrews. Built c. 1788 - 1791 showing Edward Marxwell addition of 1904 with newly replaced roofs

The first American Loyalists on the island, John Hanson and his son-in-law Ephraim Young, arrived in 1777. .At the time, the St. Andrews area consisted primarily of a trading post operated from Saint John and an Indigenous presence. Arriving by sea from Gouldsboro, Maine, Hanson and Young were the first loyalists to arrive in the area at the start of the American Revolutionary War. They settled on Consquamcook Island with their families, however they did not have a legal claim to the land.

Six years later, a large group of loyalists arrived and Captain Samuel Osborn was granted title to ownership of the island. When Hanson and Young refused to leave, Osborn began using the island for target practice for the 38 guns of the warship Arethusa. After being forced off their land, Hanson and Young petitioned Governor General Carleton in Halifax for the title to the island; however, Carleton ruled in favor of Captain Samuel Osborn. Traces of early loyalist buildings were excavated in the 1970s.

In 1791, Osborn sold the island to the Town's minister, Reverend Samuel Andrews, for whom the island was later named. Though Andrews built a small stone cottage on the island, still standing today, by 1798 he had put the property up for sale once again. There were, however, apparently no takers, as the island was still in his possession upon his death in 1818. The land was passed on to his son Elisha Andrews, St. Andrew's Sheriff, then to Elisha's son Marshall, and finally to Marshall's son Edwin. Edwin and Marshall Andrews lived on the island until 1891, at which point it was sold to Sir William Van Horne.

== Van Horne and Covenhoven ==
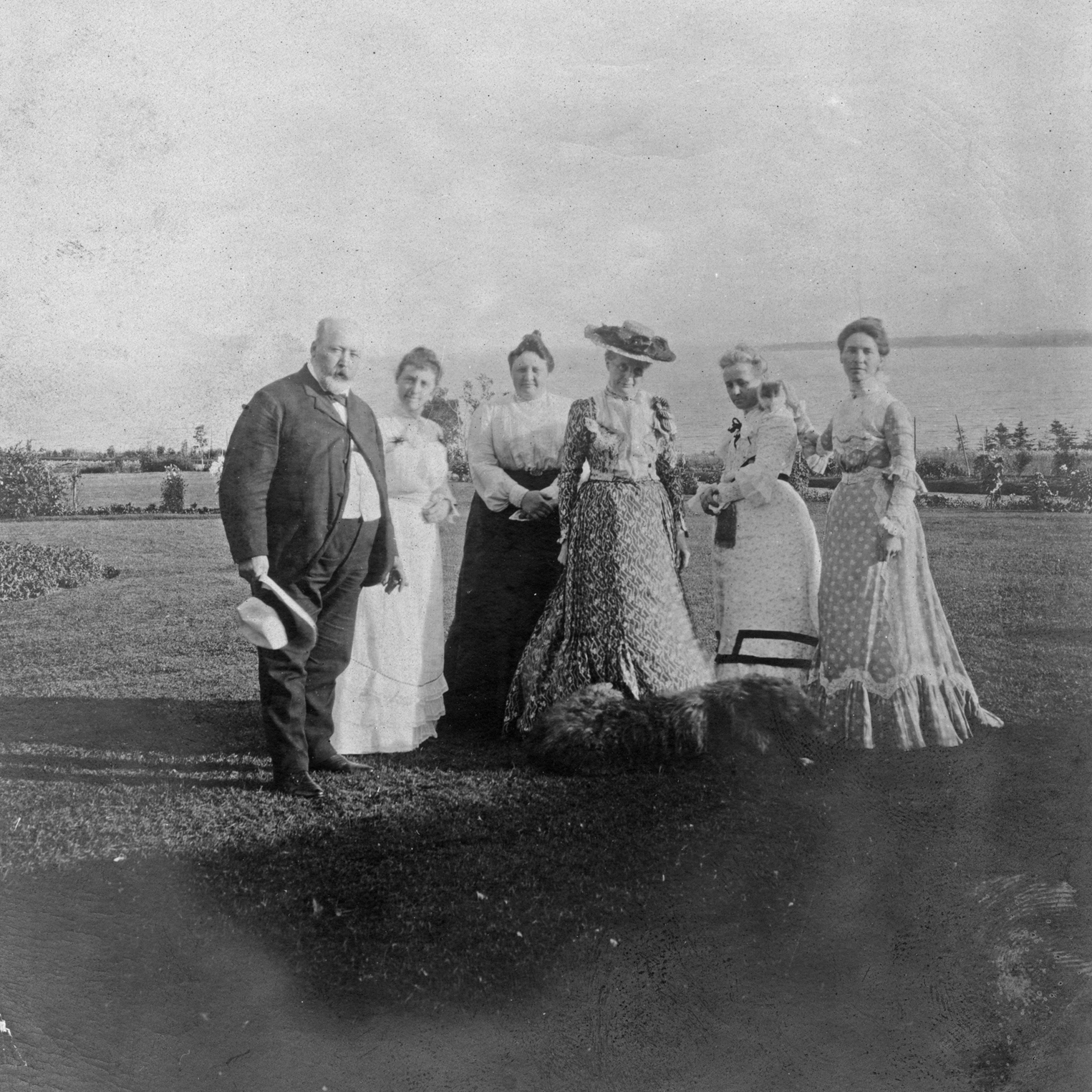
Sir William and Family, c. 1896. LAC e007914033

In 1889 Van Horne, President of the Canadian Pacific Railway, arrived in St. Andrews on tour of inspection of the New Brunswick Railway, newly purchased by the CPR. Van Horne was impressed with the town and in 1891, purchased 150 acres (0.61 km^{2}) from Edwin Andrews and began construction of Covenhoven, his summer home.

Covenhoven, c. 1895. D. Will MacKay Photo, Charlotte County Archives

Designed by Van Horne himself, Covenhoven was constructed of red sandstone quarried on the island and was originally relatively small. Between 1892 and 1901, Van Horne continued to expand, making two major additions to the house, with an eventual floor space of 10,000 square feet. Van Horne was assisted in these renovations by Edward Maxwell, celebrated Montreal architect responsible for many renowned designs across Canada, including numerous CPR commissions such as the Chateau Frontenac. When completed, the house had 50 rooms, of which around 26 made up the family's main living quarters. The varying stages of construction created unique features, including the three roof pitches arranged serially, numerous staircases, unusual connections between rooms, and multi-levelled attics.

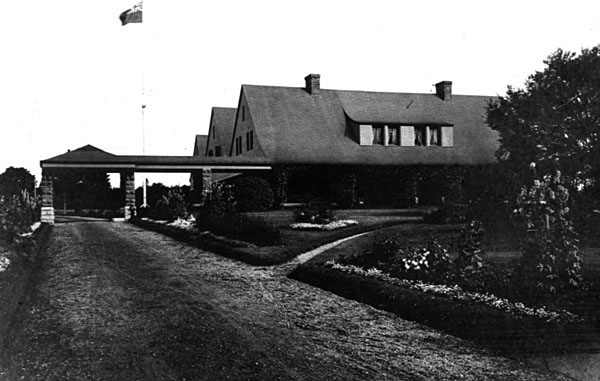
Covenhoven, 1912

As an avid and knowledgeable antique collector, the walls of Covenhoven were hung with an approximate eighty works of art, many of which were completed by Van Horne himself. A common theme was birch trees, while other paintings included various landscapes of scenery from across the island. 21 of Van Horne's works can still be seen in the home today. The home and surrounding buildings and gardens quickly became renowned, and the island became a tourist attraction even during Van Horne's lifetime, with visitors- tourists and dignitaries alike- considering the island a must-see.

=== The Barn ===
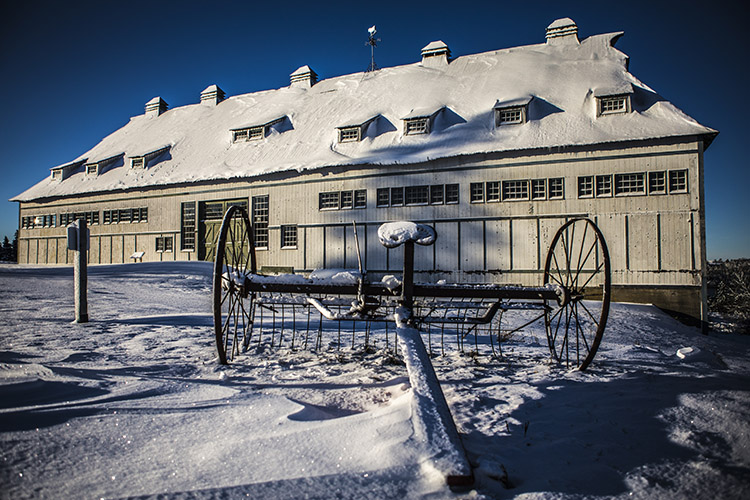
The Great Barn, 2016, pre-restoration

In 1898, Maxwell designed a large chateau-style barn for Van Horne, one of the largest in the Maritimes, and often regarded as one of the most beautiful. This barn was used for breeding of Van Horne's prizewinning Clydesdale horses and Dutch Belted cattle, one of the only such herds in North America. This farm served as a nursery for his larger operations in East Selkirk, Manitoba.

The farm was also home to pigs, geese, ducks, chickens and turkeys. The produce of the farm and gardens was shipped to Montreal by night train during the winter months, providing the family with fresh food throughout the year. The barn was surrounded by several outbuildings, including a creamery, smaller barns, and living quarters for the workers.

=== The Gardens ===
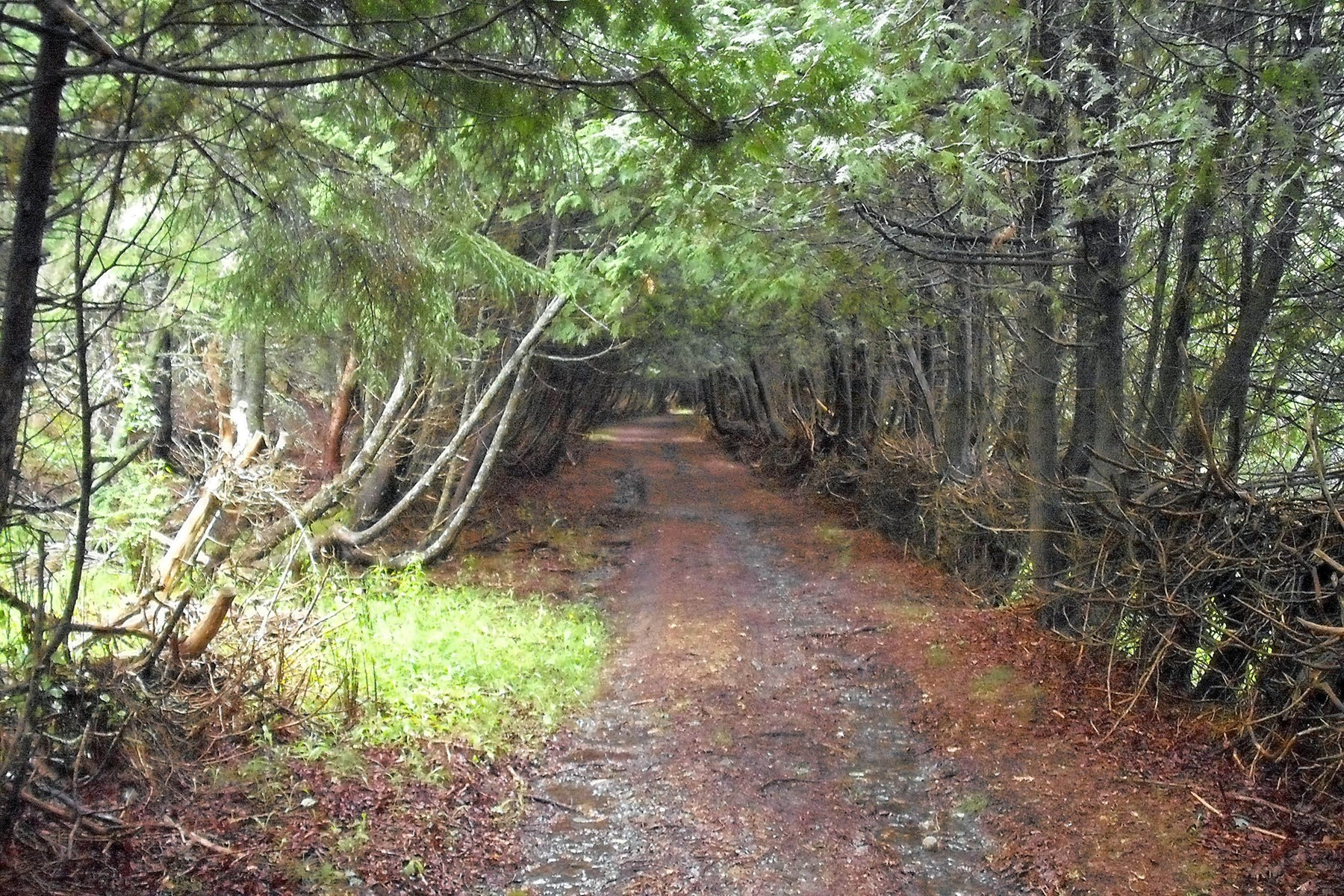
Old Carriage Road, Minister's Island

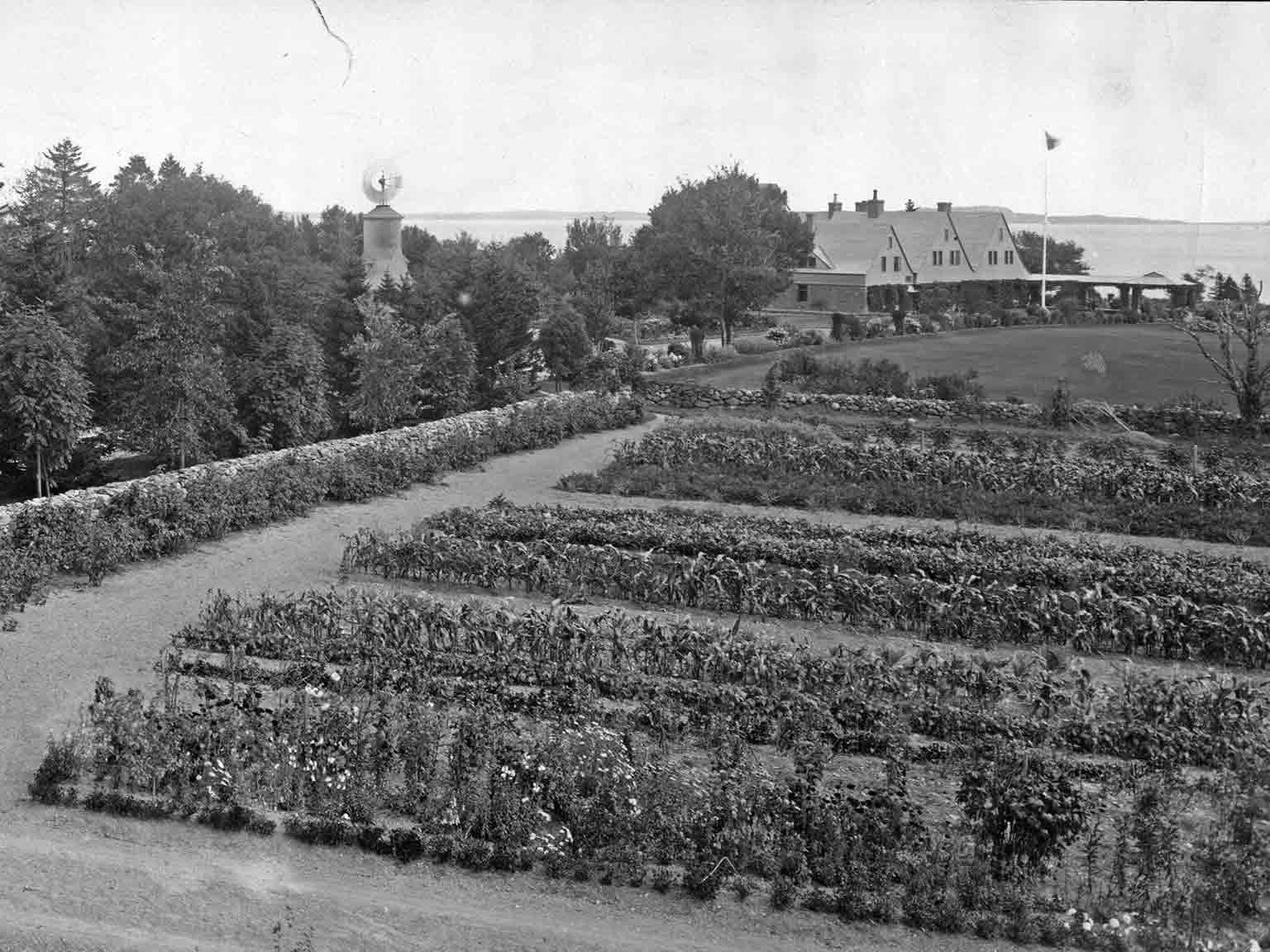
Covenhoven and Gardens, 1910. LAC e007914028

Adjacent to Covenhoven were several large greenhouses, providing the Van Hornes with grapes, peaches, nectarines, cherries and cucumbers. An expert gardener, Van Horne's grounds became famous for their extensive parterres of flowers and orchards, and miles of manicured roads that bordered the island. Cultivated gardens surrounded Covenhoven, while paths were maintained across the island for walking, riding, and carriage rides.

=== Other Outbuildings ===
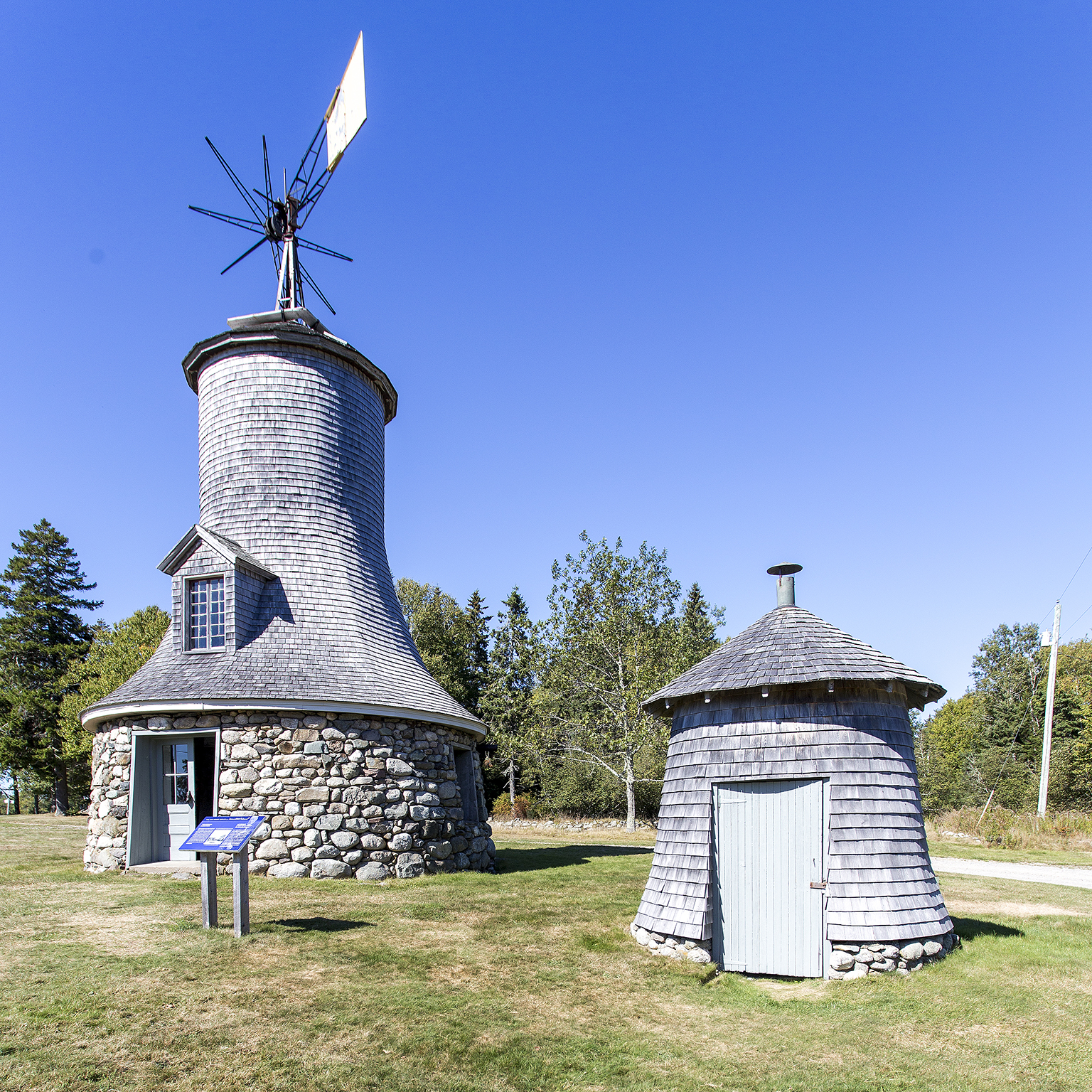
Windmill and Gas House

In addition to the barns and greenhouses, Covenhoven was supported by numerous outbuildings, including a windmill, a gas house, a carriage house, and a gardener's cottage. At the southern tip of the island, Van Horne constructed a bathhouse: a perfectly round, two-level building, the upper level offering panoramic views of the bay while the lower level contained changing rooms and provided access to the beach, and the family's in-ground tidal swimming pool.

== Covenhoven Post-Van Horne ==
Following Van Horne's death in 1915, Sir William's daughter Adaline inherited the estate. Very similar to her father, Adaline loved the island and the farm and maintained the property until her death in 1941. From there it was managed by the Royal Trust Company of Montreal on behalf of the Edith Bruce, wife of Adaline's deceased brother, Richard Benedict Van Horne, and his granddaughter Beverley Ann, born in 1932. Throughout the forties and fifties, Mrs. Bruce made continual requests for cost-saving measures, resulting in the gardens and greenhouse operations being scaled back considerably; tenants were eventually found to occupy the property for the summers of about 1949–1953.

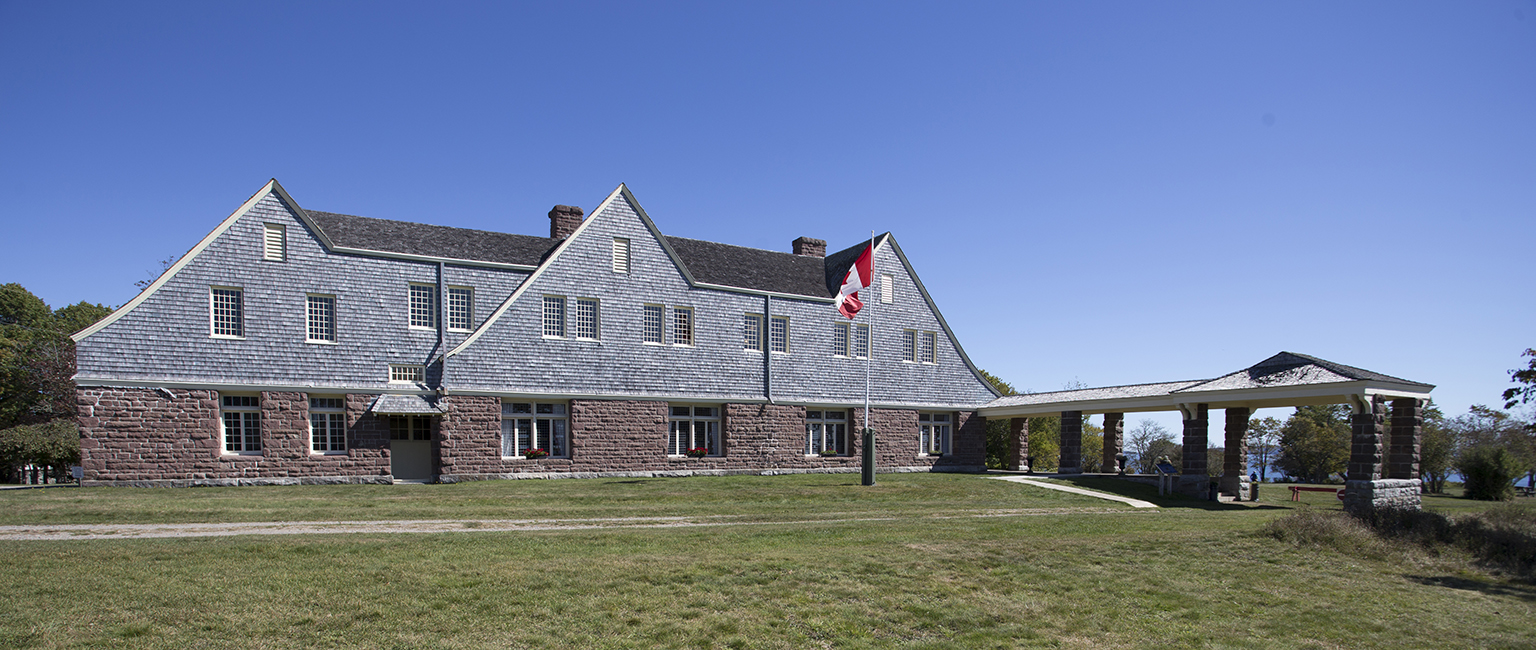
Covenhoven 2017

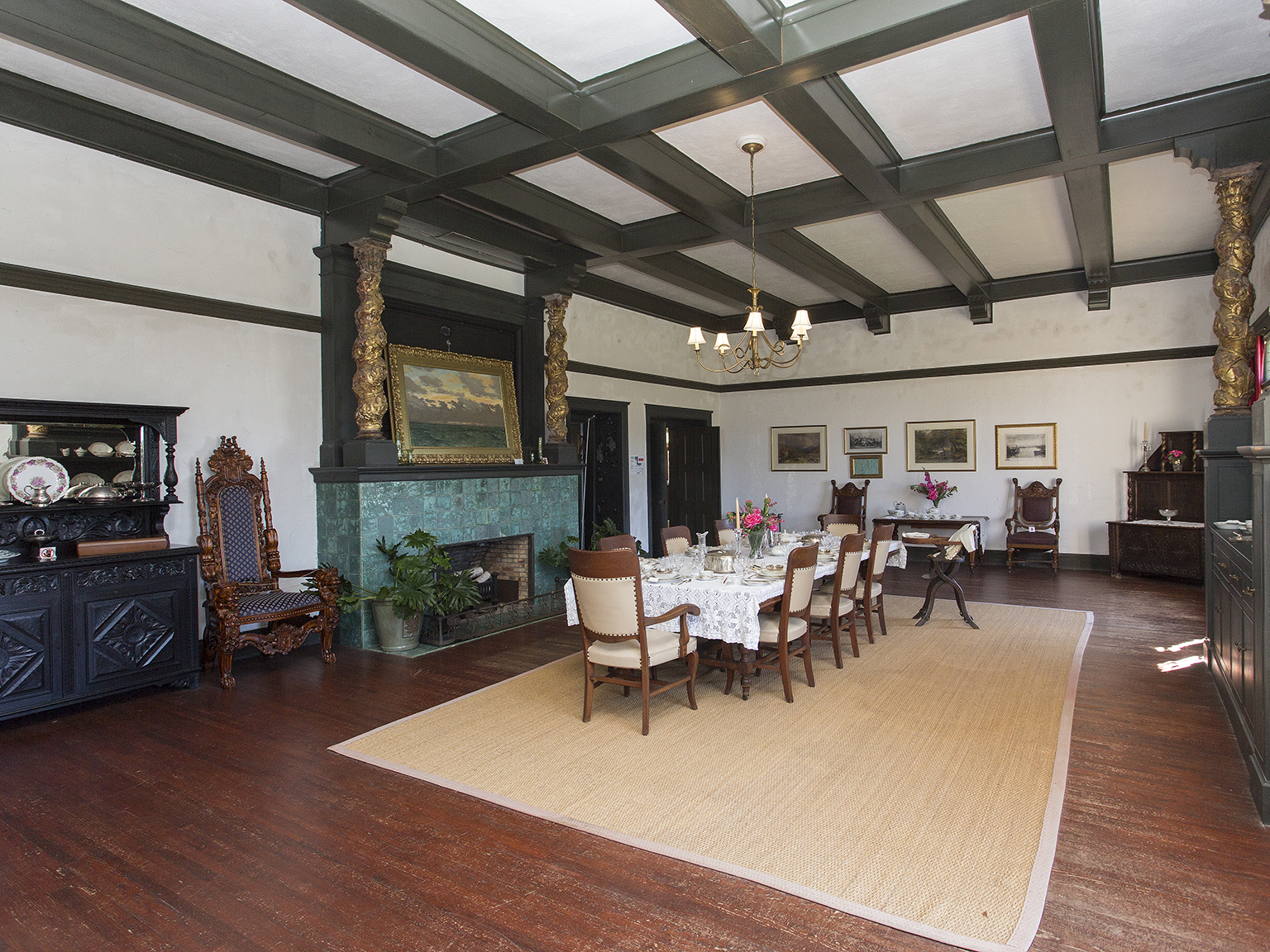
Diningroom

Beverley Ann came of age in 1953 and took possession of the house; though she visited the island, she showed little interest in maintaining or restoring the island. It was largely unoccupied, and in 1961, was sold to an American company. This group formed the Van Horne Island Club and drew up plans to turn the island into a private resort, with Covenhoven as a clubhouse, the bathhouse as a lounge, a golf course, trap and skeet shooting, yachting, and an airstrip. However, these plans did not come to fruition, owing to the high cost of operating the island, making improvements such as installing electric lighting, and the generally inaccessibility of the island. After 12 years and a sizeable investment, the Van Horne Island Club had hosted only friends and families of the Club members; it was then sold to Norman Langdon, a real estate developer from Maine.

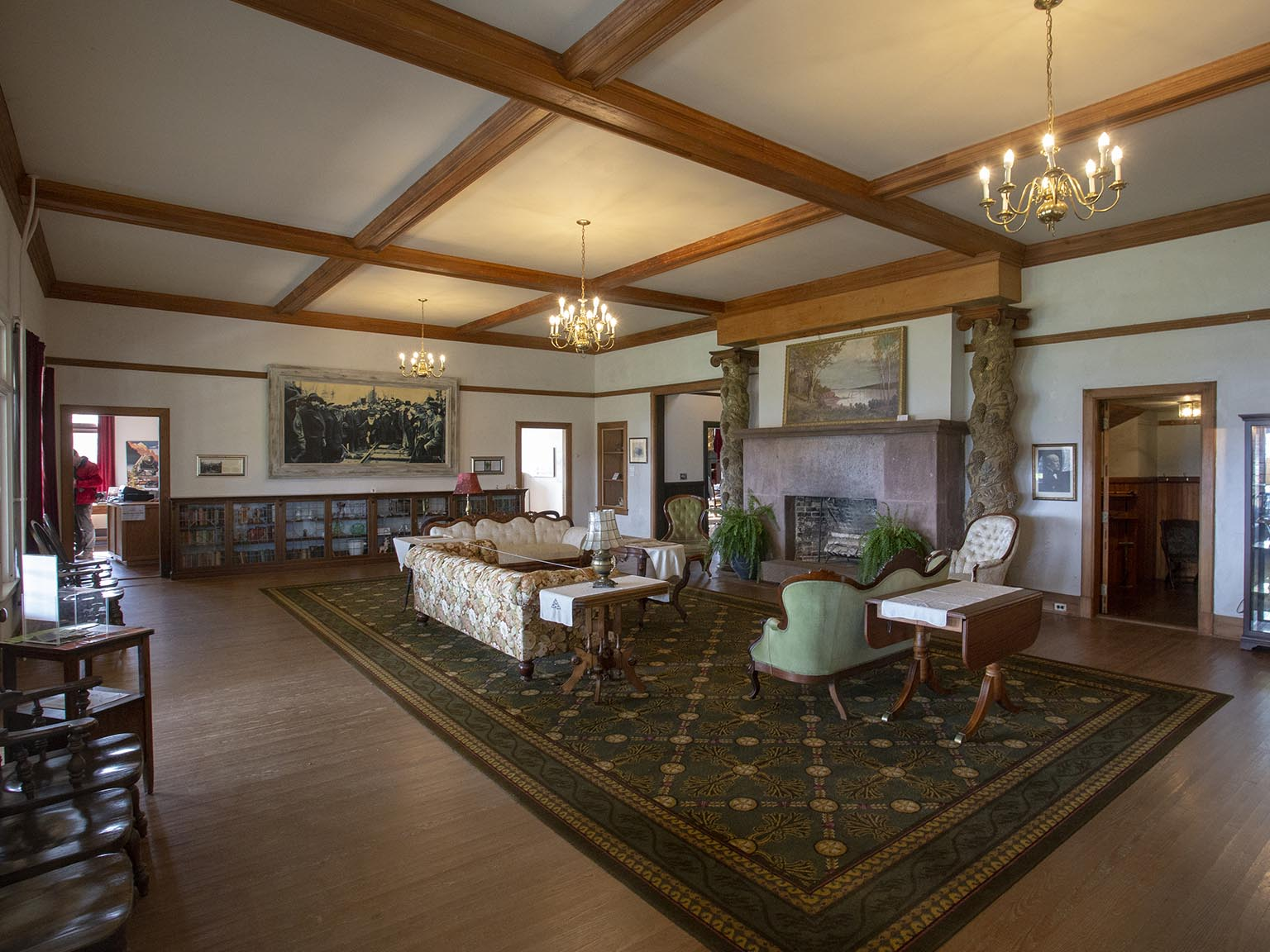
Covenhoven Parlour 2018

Langdon's plans were similar to those of the Van Horne Island Club and met a similar fate. After expenditures of around $300,000 (by his own estimation), Langdon was in approximately the same economic situation as the Van Horne Island Club had been. He attempted to sell the island to the Province of New Brunswick, but negotiations were slow, and finally in 1977 Langdon auctioned off the contents of the house and the island itself in an event that drew a great deal of media attention. The Van Horne home in Sherbrooke St, Montreal had been torn down in 1973, leaving Covenhoven the only remaining Van Horne residence; as such, many considered it of national significance, given Van Horne's close connection to the unification of the country under the Confederation.

Representatives of the Province of New Brunswick attended the auction and purchased some artifacts, but many were taken from the house during the auction. After two businessmen, Michael McPherson and Alexander George, took out an option on the island itself, the Province felt something drastic needed to be done; the Island was declared a protected site, prohibiting any potential owners from making any changes without approval. McPherson and George subsequently declined to exercise their option, causing Langdon to reopen negotiations with the Province. The Province purchased the island in 1977 with the exception of one outstanding lot, which was picked up in 1982.

== National Historic Sites ==
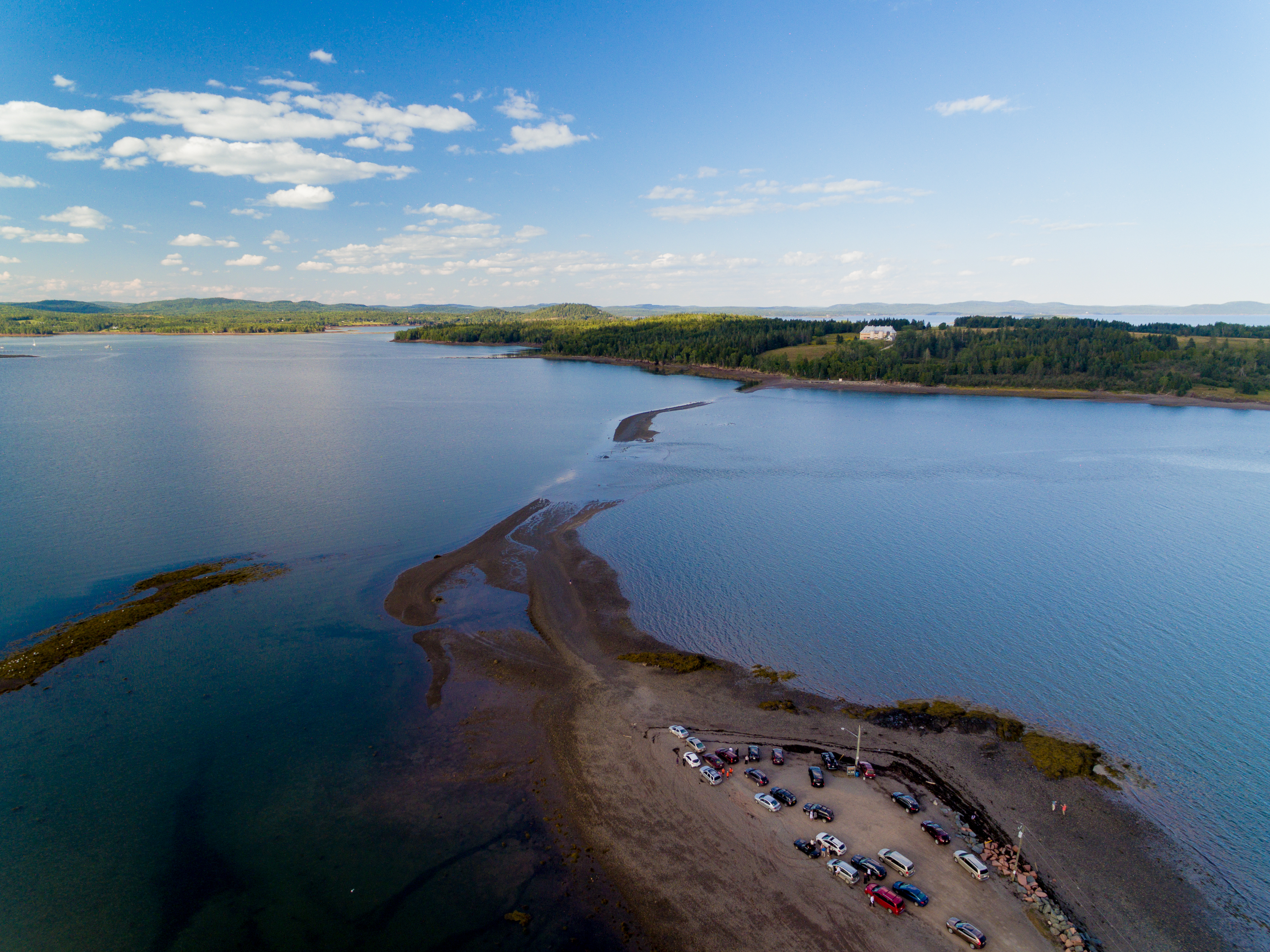
Cars wait for access to Minister's Island

The island's Shell Midden was recognized as a National Historic Site in 1978, recognizing the importance of the site to First Nations history; the island as a whole was declared a National Historic Site in 1996 for its Van Horne associations. In the intervening years, the island was largely closed to visitors.

== Van Horne Estate on Ministers Island Inc. ==
Van Horne Estate on Ministers Island, a non-profit local charity, was formed in 2004. The express purpose of this organization was to "protect, preserve, develop and promote the legacy of Ministers Island". They took over running of the island in 2006 and are responsible for providing tours on the island throughout the summer, as well as managing restoration efforts. Between 2012 and 2017 the island saw a 330% growth in visitors, signifying widespread recognition of the importance of this site.

=== Restoration ===
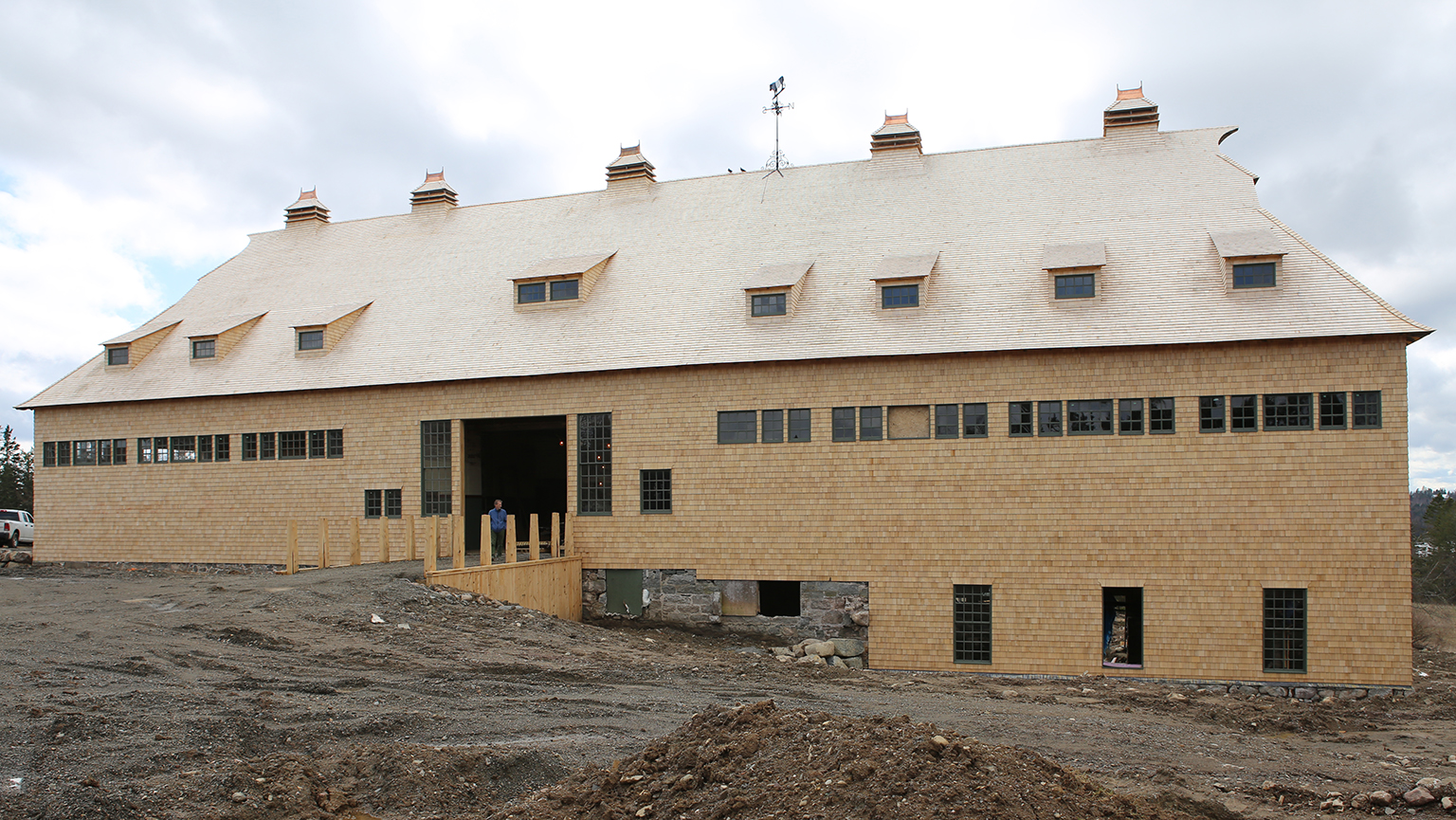
Barn newly shingled. April 2018

While the majority of Van Horne's artifacts were removed during the 1977 auction, recent efforts returned some original paintings and furniture and other artifacts. The stone bathhouse and windmill-pump house were restored in 2008.

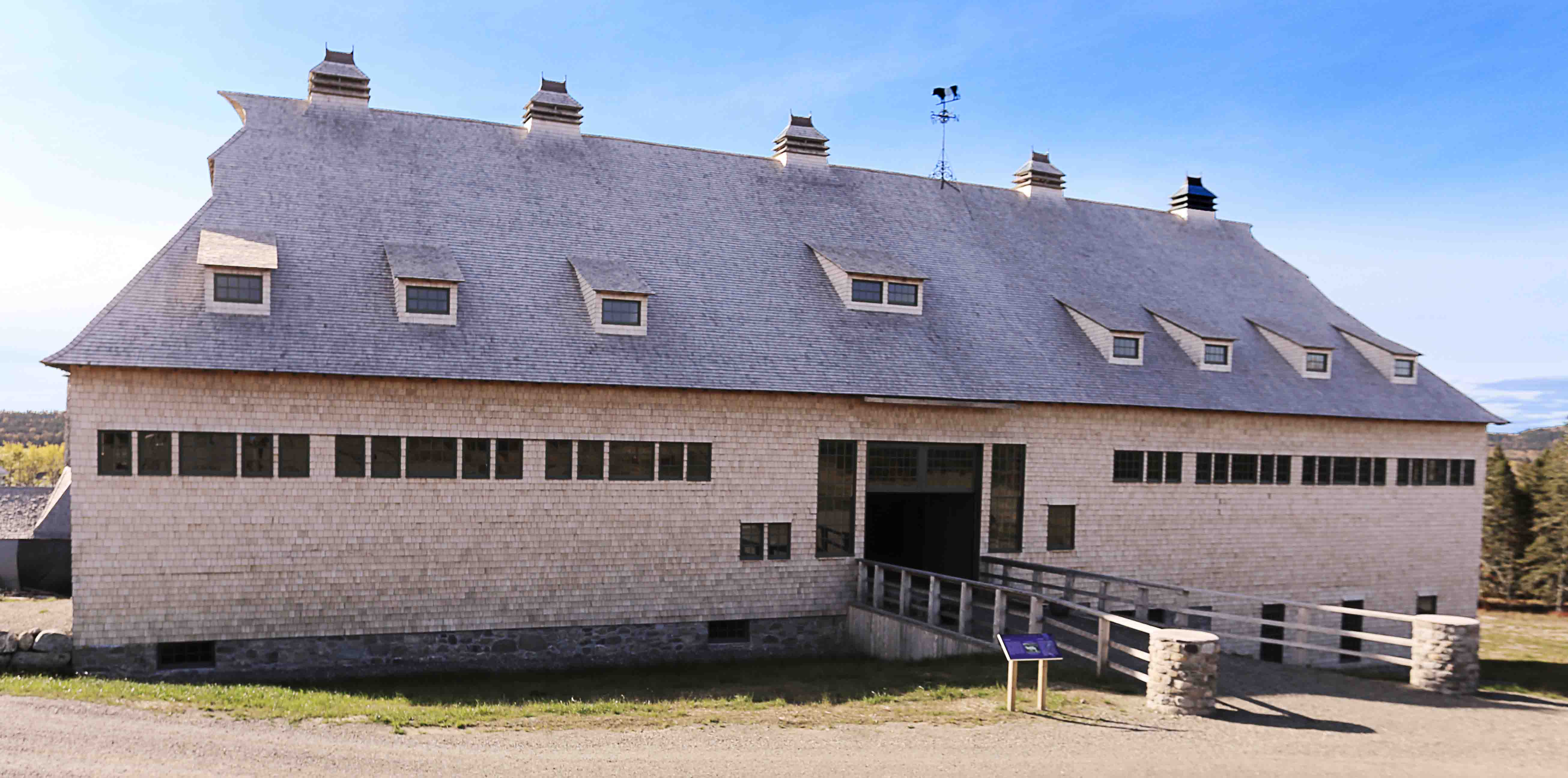
The Great Barn, 2017-18 Restoration

Following major weather damage in 2016, the barn underwent restoration. Future development plans have been suggested.

== See also ==
- List of National Historic Sites in Canada
- List of National Historic Sites in New Brunswick
- List of communities in New Brunswick
- List of islands of New Brunswick
