= List of museums in New Brunswick =

This list of museums in New Brunswick, Canada contains museums which are defined for this context as institutions (including nonprofit organizations, government entities, and private businesses) that collect and care for objects of cultural, artistic, scientific, or historical interest and make their collections or related exhibits available for public viewing. Also included are non-profit art galleries and university art galleries. Museums that exist only in cyberspace (i.e., virtual museums) are not included.

Name	Photograph	Town/City	County	Type	Summary
Aberdeen Cultural Centre		Moncton	Westmorland	Art	
Agricultural Museum of New Brunswick		Sussex	Kings	History	website, local history including agricultural equipment, housewares, military memorabilia, railway display
Albert County Museum		Hopewell Cape	Albert	History	Prime Minister R.B. Bennett Commemorative Centre; Tom Collins - axe murderer; 8 original buildings in their original locations featuring 22 themed galleries; Local history, historic household artifacts, antiques, a gaol (jail), agricultural equipment, shipbuilding; website
Andrew and Laura McCain Art Gallery		Florenceville	Carleton	Art	website
Atlantic Salmon Museum		Doaktown	Northumberland	Sports	website, salmon fishing and natural history of salmon
Barbour's General Store		Saint John	Saint John	History	19th-century Victorian period general store
Beaubears Island Interpretive Centre		Beaubears Island	Northumberland	History	website, local history
Beaverbrook Art Gallery		Fredericton	York	Art	Includes 19th- and 20th-century Canadian artists, works by some important European artists
Bonar Law Provincial Historic Site		Five Rivers	Kent	Historic house	information, 1870s period home of Bonar Law
Boultenhouse Heritage Centre		Sackville	Westmorland	History	website, local history, operated by the Tantramar Heritage Trust
Campbell Carriage Factory Museum		Middle Sackville	Westmorland	Industry	website, 19th-century horse-drawn carriage "factory" and equipment, operated by the Tantramar Heritage Trust
Campobello Public Library and Museum		Campobello Island	Charlotte	History	website, local history
Canadian Military Engineers Museum		Oromocto	Sunbury	Military	website, work and role of the Canadian Military Engineers in Canada, located at the Canadian Forces School of Military Engineering
Cape Jourimain Nature Centre		Cape Jourimain	Westmorland	Natural history	Area natural and cultural history
Carleton County Historical Society		Woodstock	Carleton	History	Local history
Carleton Martello Tower		Saint John	Saint John	Military	Includes restored powder magazine, restored barracks room and exhibits about the fort
Central New Brunswick Woodsmen's Museum		Boiestown	Northumberland	Industry	Forestry industry camp
Charles Connell House		Woodstock	Carleton	History	Local history displays, operated by the Carleton County Historical Society
Charlotte County Museum		St. Stephen	Charlotte	History	Facebook site, local history
Chocolate Museum		St. Stephen	Charlotte	Food	History and manufacturing of chocolate and candy and the Ganong Bros. company
Clair Historical Site		Clair	Madawaska	Historic house	information, managed by the Société Historique de Clair
Colville House	Sackville		Westmorland	Biographical	website, home and works of artist Alex Colville, on campus of Mount Allison University
Currie House Museum		Fredericton Junction	Sunbury	History	Facebook site, local history
Cyr Historical House		Saint-Basile	Madawaska	Historic house	information, 1820s period house
Doak Historic Site		Doaktown	Northumberland	Historic house	Open in summer, early 19th-century period home with weaving studio
Du Réel au Miniature; Railway Interpretation Centre		Edmundston	Madawaska	Railway	website, railway equipment, miniature train layout of New Brunswick
Éco-musée de l’Huître		Caraquet	Gloucester	Multiple	information, oyster farming industry, local history and culture
Église historique de Barachois		Grand-Barachois	Westmorland	Multiple	information, 1824 Acadian church with art, culture and history exhibits; also known as the Msgr. Camille-André-LeBlanc Museum
8th Hussars Regimental Museum	-	Sussex	Kings	Military	History of the regiment
Fort Beauséjour – Fort Cumberland National Historic Site		,Aulac	Westmorland	Military	Site of two notable 18th-century battles
Fortin du Petit Sault Blockhouse		Edmundston	Madawaska	Military	information, reconstructed 1841 blockhouse
Fredericton Region Museum		Fredericton	York	History	Local history
Fundy Trail Interpretive Centre		Fundy-St. Martins	Saint John	History	website, area history of the logging, fishing and shipbuilding communities
Grand Manan Museum		Grand Manan Island	Charlotte	Multiple	website, local and natural history, features large display of over 300 different species of birds, the island's geology, and maritime artifacts
Gaskin Museum of Marine Life		Grand Manan Island	Charlotte	Natural history	website, operated by the Grand Manan Whale & Seabird Research Station, marine mammals
Grand Falls Museum		Grand Falls	Victoria	History	information, local history
Herman J. Good V.C Branch No.18 Royal Canadian Legion War Museum		Bathurst	Gloucester	Military	information
Historic Beaverbrook House		Miramichi	Northumberland	Historic house	website, late 19th-century Victorian home of Lord Beaverbrook
Historic Museum of Tracadie		Tracadie-Sheila	Gloucester	History	website, local history, features exhibits about 19th-century medical care of leprosy patients
John Fisher Memorial Museum		Kingston	Kings	History	website, local history
Joseph B. Michaud Blacksmith Museum		Saint-François-de-Madawaska	Madawaska	History	information, historic blacksmith shop and tools
Keillor House Museum		Dorchester	Westmorland	Historic house	website, mid-19th-century period house, operated by the Westmorland Historical Society
Kings County Museum		Hampton	Kings	History	website, local history
Kings Landing Historical Settlement		Prince William	York	Living	Recreation of a New Brunswick town from the period of 1780–1910
Loyalist House		Saint John	Saint John	Historic house	Early 19th-century house, operated by the New Brunswick Historical Society
Lutz Mountain Heritage Museum		Moncton	Westmorland	History	website, local history, located in an 1883 meeting house
MacDonald Farm Historic Site		Oak Point-Bartibog Bridge	Northumberland	Historic house	website, 1820s period house with costumed guide, farm animals
Maison Pascal-Poirier		Shediac	Westmorland	Multiple	information, historic house with exhibits about Acadian senator Pascal Poirier, and an art gallery
Maritime Motorsports Hall of Fame		Three Rivers	Westmorland	Automotive	website, includes race cars, antique vehicles, motorcycles, gocarts, snowmobiles
McAdam Railway Station		McAdam	York	Railway and Architecture	Provincial and national heritage railway station, includes museum and special events venue
Metepenagiag Heritage Park		Red Bank	Northumberland	First Nations	website, history and culture of the Metepenagiag Mi'kmaq Nation
Middle Island Irish Historical Park		Miramichi	Northumberland	Ethnic	website, area's Irish immigrants and culture
Minto Museum and Information Centre	Minto	Queens	History	website, local history	
Miramichi History Museum		Miramichi	Northumberland	Natural History	A collection of wildlife, artifacts, local and provincial heritage.
Miramichi Salmon Conservation Centre		Miramichi	Northumberland	Natural history	website, salmon hatchery tours
Moncton Museum		Moncton	Westmorland	History	Local history
Monro Heritage Centre		Strait Shores	Westmorland	History	website, local history
Monument Lefebvre National Historic Site		Memramcook	Westmorland	Ethnic	Acadian history and culture
MR21 - Digital Cathedral		Moncton	Westmorland	Ethnic	website Acadian and local history, culture and cathedral heritage
Musée Acadien		Moncton	Westmorland	Ethnic	website, part of Université de Moncton, Acadian heritage and culture
Musée Acadien de Caraquet		Caraquet	Gloucester	History	website, local history and culture of the Acadian Peninsula
[Musée de Kent		Bouctouche	Kent	History	website, local history, Acadian culture, history of the Convent of the Immaculate Conception
Musée de l'automobile		Saint-Jacques	Madawaska	Automobile	information, antique cars
Musée de Memramcook		Memramcook	Westmorland	History	website, local history
Musée des papes (Pope Museum)		Grande-Anse	Gloucester	Religious	information, history of Catholicism and the Pope
Musée des Pionniers de Grand-Digue		Grande-Digue	Kent	History	information, local history, pioneer artifacts
Musée Forestier de Kedgwick		Kedgwick	Restigouche	Forestry	website, logging camp displaying forestry industry between the 1930s and 1960s
Musée historique du Madawaska		Edmundston	Madawaska	History	website, operated by the Université de Moncton in Edmundston, local history and an art gallery
Nepisiquit Centennial Museum and Cultural Centre		Bathurst	Gloucester	Multiple	website, local history and art gallery
New Brunswick Aquarium and Marine Centre		Shippagan	Gloucester	Maritime	website, aquarium, maritime and fishing industry museum
New Brunswick Internment Camp Museum		Minto	Queens	History	website, artifacts and history of the WWII internment camp
New Brunswick Military History Museum		Oromocto	Sunbury	Military	website, history of CFB Gagetown and the military presence in Oromocto
New Brunswick Mining and Mineral Interpretation Centre		Petit-Rocher	Gloucester	Mining	information, information
New Brunswick Museum		Saint John	Saint John	Multiple	Art, decorative arts, natural history, New Brunswick history, industry and culture
New Brunswick Railway Museum		Hillsborough	Albert	Railway	Railway equipment and artifacts
New Brunswick Sports Hall of Fame		Fredericton	York	Sports	
New Denmark Memorial Museum		New Denmark	Madawaska	History	information, local history
Notre-Dame-du-Sacré-Coeur Heritage Room		Moncton	Westmorland	Religious	website, information, artifacts, history and art of the Congregation of Religieuses de Notre-Dame-du-Sacré-Coeur
Old Bank Museum		Riverside-Albert	Albert	History	information
Old Carleton County Court House		Woodstock	Carleton	History	Mid-19th-century historic courthouse, operated by the Carleton County Historical Society
Old Government House		Fredericton	York	Historic house	Historic residence of the Lieutenant Governor of New Brunswick, open for tours
Owens Art Gallery		Sackville	Westmorland	Art	website, part of Mount Allison University
Petitcodiac War Museum		Three Rivers	Westmorland	Military	information
Potato World		Florenceville-Bristol	Carleton	Food	website, potato history, farming, industry and impact in the region
Quaco Museum		Fundy-St. Martins	Saint John	History	website, local history
Quartermain Earth Science Centre		Fredericton	York	Science	website, Showcases local geology and other geological topics as interactive exhibits.
Queens County Heritage		Arcadia	Queens	Multiple	website, includes local history exhibitions in the 1786 Tilley House, A National Historic Site, the 1836 Queens County Court House, a Provincial Historic Site, and the historic 1818 Anthony Flower House Museum & Gallery with art and family history.
Religious Hospitallers of Saint Joseph Museum		Saint-Basile	Madawaska	Medical	website, includes instruments and apparatus used in the hospital or the pharmacy
Restigouche Regional Museum		Dalhousie	Restigouche	History	information, local history
Richibucto River Museum		Five Rivers	Kent	History	information, local history
Roosevelt Campobello International Park		Campobello Island	Charlotte	Historic house	Features the 1920s period Roosevelt Cottage and visitor centre exhibits about the Franklin D. Roosevelt family and their visits to the island
Ross Memorial Museum		St. Andrews	Charlotte	Art	Historic 19th-century mansion with a collection of furniture and decorative arts
St. Andrews Blockhouse National Historic Site		St. Andrews	Charlotte	Military	website, restored early 19th-century blockhouse with exhibits
St. James Textile Museum		Dorchester	Westmorland	Textile	website, historic textiles, textile-making tools and a loom, carpenter's and blacksmith's tools, operated by the Westmorland Historical Society
St. Michaels Museum		Miramichi	Northumberland	History	website, local history and culture
Saint-Isidore Museum		Hautes-Terres	Gloucester	History	information, local history
Saint John Arts Centre		Saint John	Saint John	Art	website, includes several galleries
Saint John Firefighters' Museum		Saint John	Saint John	Firefighting	information
Saint John Jewish Historical Museum		Saint John	Saint John	Ethnic	[Jewish history and culture in Saint John and New Brunswick
School Days Museum		Fredericton	York	Education	website, history of education in New Brunswick
Science East		Fredericton	York	Science	
Sheriff Andrews House		St. Andrews	Charlotte	Historic house	information, early 19th-century house with costumed interpreters
Shogomoc Historical Railway Site		Florenceville-Bristol	Carleton	Railway	website, restored CPR railway station, artifacts and three railway cars
Southern Victoria Historical Museum		Southern Victoria	Victoria	History	information, local history
Struts Gallery		Sackville	Westmorland	Art	website
Sunbury Shores Arts & Nature Centre		St. Andrews	Charlotte	Art	website, art exhibits and natural history programs
Tabusintac Memorial Library and Museum		Tabusintac	Northumberland	History	website, local history
Tankville School Museum		Tankville	Westmorland	Education	information, information, early 20th-century period schoolhouse
Thomas Williams House		Moncton	Westmorland	Historic house	website, late 19th-century Victorian period house
Village Historique Acadien		New Bandon	Gloucester	Living	Features over 40 buildings, portrays life of the Acadians between 1770 and 1939
Walls Historic Site (Canada)		Miramichi River Valley	Northumberland	Historic house	information
Wild Salmon Nature Centre		St. Andrews	Charlotte	Natural history	website, biology, research, issues affecting salmon, angling heritage and art, operated by the Atlantic Salmon Federation
William Henry Steeves House Museum		Hillsborough	Westmorland	Historic house	website, mid-19th-century period home of politician William Henry Steeves
W.S. Loggie Cultural Centre		Miramichi	Northumberland	History	information

== See also ==
- Nature centres in New Brunswick
