= Francis Peabody Sharp =

Canadian botanist (1823–1903)

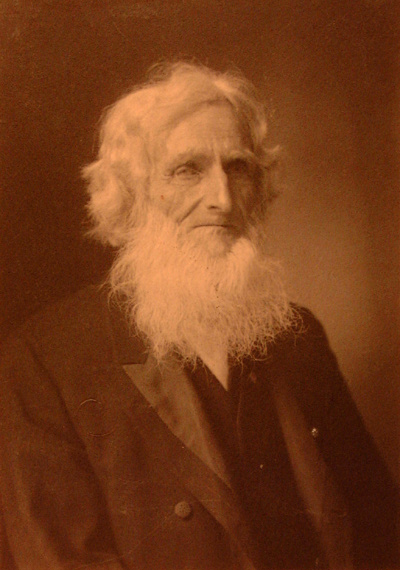
- Born: September 3, 1823; Northampton, New Brunswick
- Died: December 12, 1903 (aged 80); Woodstock, New Brunswick
- Occupation(s): pomologist, businessman
- Known for: pioneered selective breeding of apples
- Relatives: Tappan Adney, son-in-law
- Family: 8 children, including Minnie Bell Sharp

Francis Peabody Sharp (3 September 1823 – 12 December 1903) was a Canadian pomologist and businessman. He pioneered the controlled hybridization of apples to create new varieties suited to short seasons and cold winters. He owned large orchard and plant nursery businesses in the province of New Brunswick from which he shipped to Canada and the United States.

== Family background and early life ==
Sharp's father was Adam Boyle Sharp, a businessman and landowner. Adam Sharp owned a store in Upper Woodstock, New Brunswick and was manager of the local bank branch, as well as serving as justice of the peace and captain in the militia. Francis Peabody Sharp's mother, Maria Peabody, was Adam Sharp's second wife. She was a granddaughter of Captain Francis Peabody, a veteran of the Seven Years' War and one of the founders of the English settlement at Maugerville on the Saint John River.

Francis Peabody Sharp attended grammar school and worked in his father's store. He devoted himself to the study of horticulture, particularly fruit growing, acquiring an extensive library of books and agricultural publications.

== Apple breeding ==
In 1844 he started a plant nursery and an orchard with 100 apple trees which he planted on land acquired from his father, with the goal of developing apple varieties adapted to New Brunswick's cold winters and short growing season. He did this by planting potentially hardy varieties and putting into practice the new methods of controlled hybridization which he had studied.

In 1849 he purchased from a nursery in Bangor, Maine 1000 seeds that had been imported from Russia, and planted them in November of that year. From this planting one tree bore apples in 1854, indicating remarkably early maturity and hardiness. The fruit was large and proved well suited to cooking. Sharp used this tree, which came to be known as the "New Brunswicker" as the basis for crossing with other varieties. The apple has also been known as "Sharp's New Brunswick apple" and "Duchess of New Brunswick".

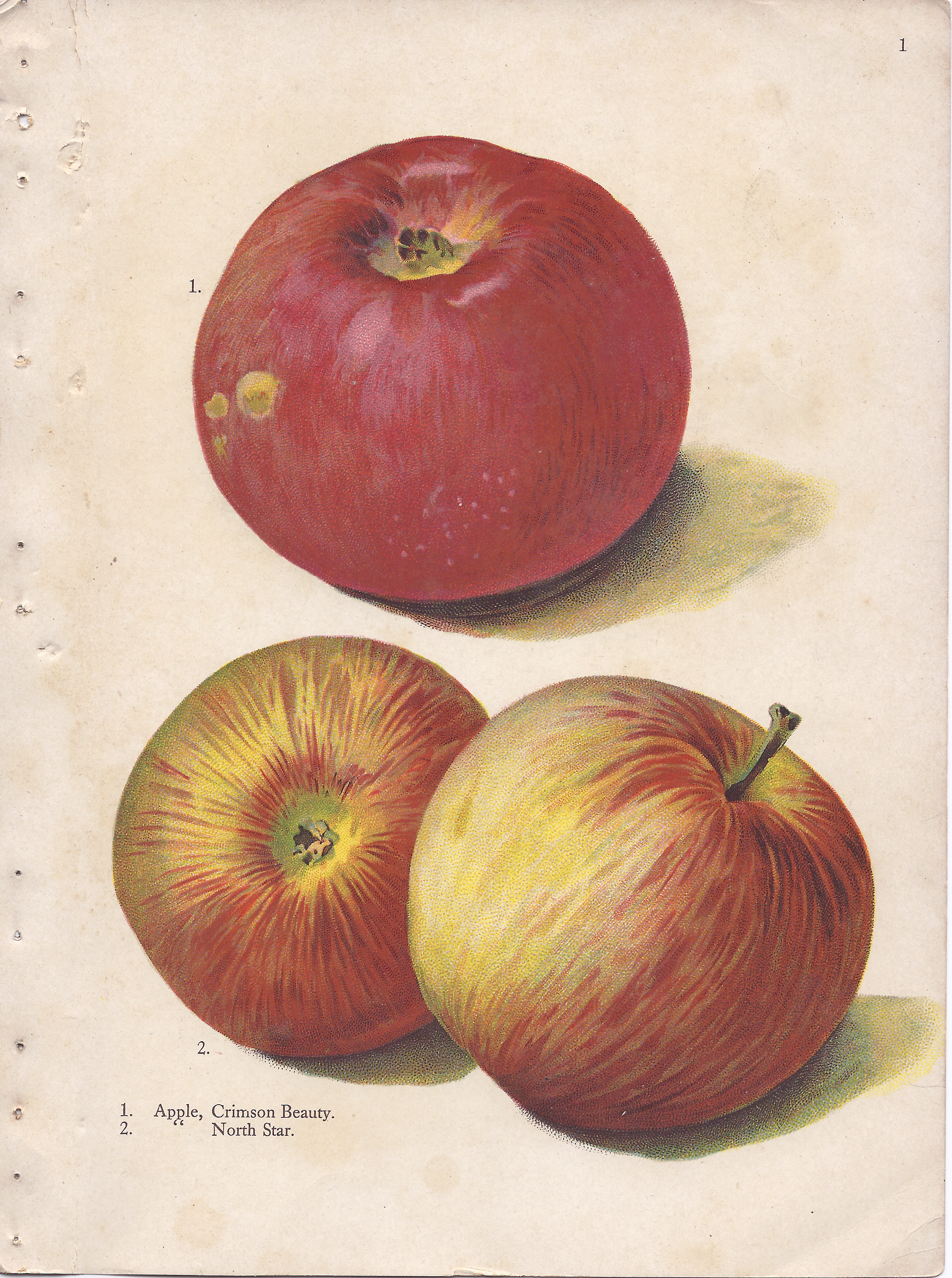
Crimson Beauty (top) from a 1909 Brown Brothers Nursery catalogue

Sharp created a hybrid between the New Brunswicker and the Fameuse, an old variety grown in Quebec. By grafting scions of the Fameuse onto hardy rootstocks, he created trees that could be crossed with the New Brunswicker in a controlled manner to produce hybrid seeds. The result, in 1866, was a solid red early apple, the "first true hybrid apple from a controlled cross-breeding experiment", that he named "Crimson Beauty".

In 1882 he was invited to accompany Joseph Lancaster Budd of Iowa Agricultural College and other scientists to Russia to study the fruit trees there, but he declined. On their return they gave Sharp 50 specimens of Russian apples that they had collected. He turned down offers from Iowa Agricultural College to give lectures, and from the government of Canada to publish a book on his work.

In 1896 he presented a paper on his techniques to the Farmers' and Dairymens' Association of New Brunswick, but wrote to his daughter, Minnie Bell Sharp, that "it is remarkable for what is left out", noting that "my discoveries would so greatly cheapen production of apples as to injure our own sales".

== Orchard and nursery businesses ==
Between 1848 and 1850 Sharp established Woodstock Nurseries, where he planted apple and plum trees. By 1859 he was shipping apples within New Brunswick and abroad. He used advanced horticultural methods to maximize his orchards' yields, including the intensive cultivation of dwarf trees planted close together. As his businesses grew, he purchased and rented increasing amounts of land, taking out large mortgages. In the 1870s he formed a business partnership with his brother-in-law William Sperry Shea. In 1890 he had the largest orchard and nursery businesses in Canada, with 900,000 trees in his nursery stock. As well as apples these included plum, cherry and pear. His orchards annually shipped as many as 18,000 barrels (~2,500 t) to the United States and 7,000 barrels (~950 t) within Canada.

In 1881 most of the buildings at the nursery, and Sharp's family home, were lost in a fire. In 1887 Sharp handed the nursery business over to his son Franklin, who established the "Franklin Sharp orchard" on 70 acres between Upper Woodstock and Woodstock. With 20,000 trees, it was the largest apple orchard in the Maritimes. In 1890 the introduction in the United States of the McKinley Tariff hurt the Sharps' thriving export business. The businesses were unable to pay the mortgages on the land Sharp had acquired, and some of the holdings had to be sold off. In 1892 Franklin died of tuberculosis. The remaining property then passed to Franklin's two youngest sisters, and most of it was sold in 1904.

== Family ==
Francis Peabody Sharp married Maria Shaw of Lower Wakefield on 31 December 1853. They had eight children, of whom the first three all died of diphtheria within one week in 1861. Their fourth child, born in 1860, was Franklin, who became his father's business partner and died in 1892. Minnie Bell Sharp, born in 1865, was a music teacher who married the artist and writer Tappan Adney in 1899. Between 1906 and 1916 the couple tried to restore the family's orchards and nurseries, but ultimately the businesses were financially unsuccessful. The youngest son, Humboldt, became a nursery manager in British Columbia. The two youngest daughters, Lizzie and Harriet Jane, inherited the family properties, most of which were sold off after Lizzie died in 1904. Francis Peabody Sharp died on 12 December 1903 and his widow Maria Sharp died on 29 March 1904.
