= Tantramar =

Tantramar may refer to:

- Tantramar, New Brunswick, a town in Canada
- Tantramar Marshes, near Sackville, New Brunswick
- Tantramar (electoral district), a provincial riding in New Brunswick

== See also ==
- Tantramar Civic Centre
- Tantramar Heritage Trust
- Tantramar Regional High School
