= George Gee =

George Gee may refer to:

- George Gee (murderer) (1881–1904), Canadian murderer
- George Gee (bandleader), Chinese-American swing big-band leader
- George Gee (ice hockey) (1922–1972), Canadian professional ice hockey player
- George Gee (mayor), former mayor of Petone, the first Chinese-New Zealander mayor
