= Fraser Armstrong =

Fraser Armstrong may refer to:

- Fraser Armstrong (professor) (born 1951), British professor of chemistry at Oxford University and a Fellow of St John's College, Oxford
- R. Fraser Armstrong (1889–1983), Canadian hospital administrator and engineer
- Fraser Armstrong (rugby union) (born 1992), New Zealand rugby union player
