= Crimson Beauty =

Apple cultivar

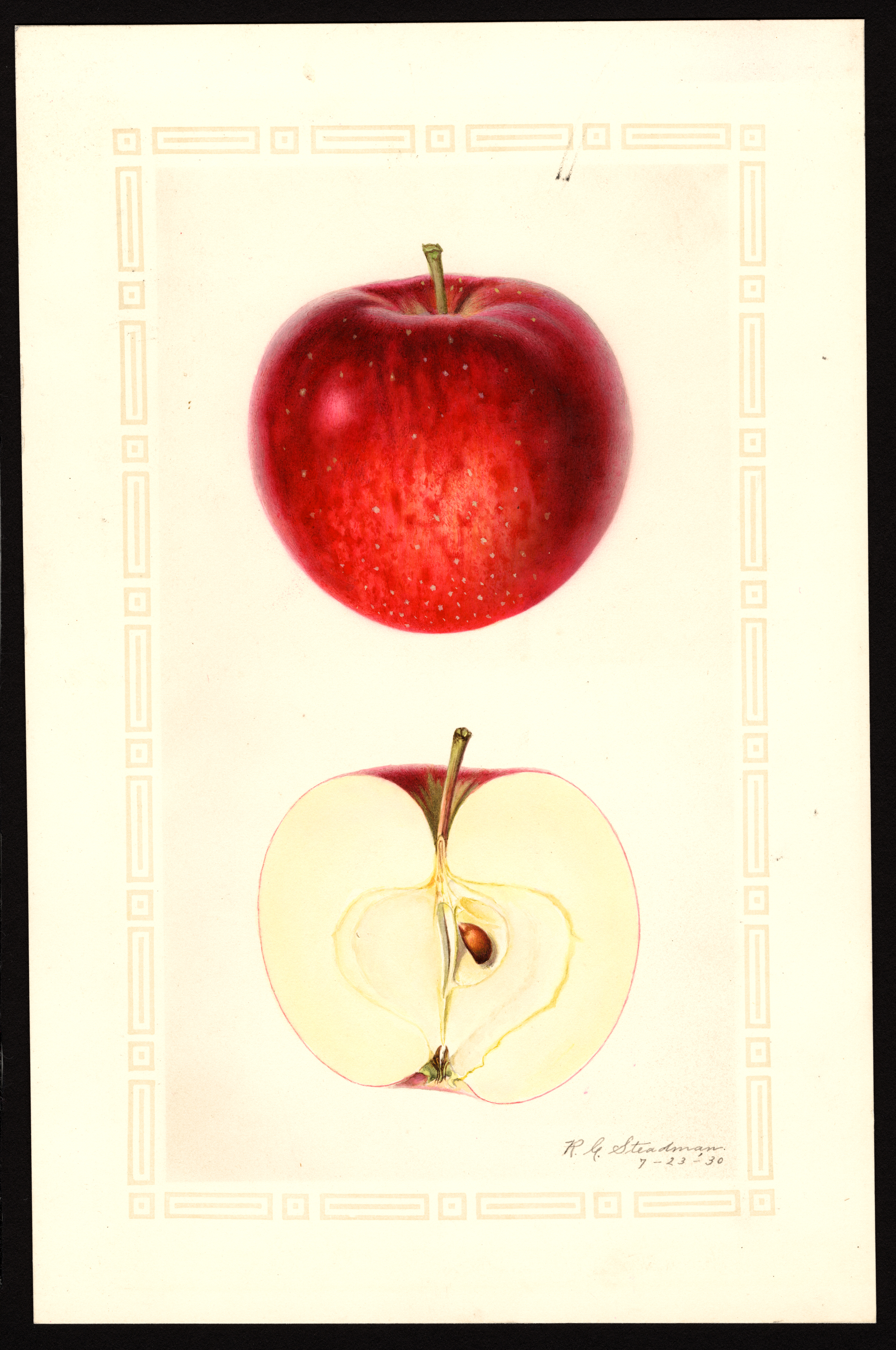
- Genus: Malus
- Species: Malus pumila
- Hybrid parentage: 'New Brunswicker' × 'Fameuse'
- Cultivar: 'Crimson Beauty'
- Marketing names: Early Red Bird
- Origin: New Brunswick, Canada

Crimson Beauty (originally Early Scarlet, sold commercially as Early Red Bird) is a cold-hardy apple cultivar developed by Francis Peabody Sharp in New Brunswick, Canada. It is an all-purpose variety suitable for fresh-eating and cooking.

After settling on the New Brunswicker to serve as the base for his hybridization experiments, Peabody Sharp started to work on developing cold-hardy apple cultivars. He developed the Crimson Beauty by crossing the New Brunswicker with the Fameuse, a variety popular in Quebec at the time. This made the Crimson Beauty the first true hybrid apple created via intentional, controlled cross-breeding.

Early in the 20th century, the Stark Brothers Nursery acquired the rights to the Crimson Beauty, and began selling it commercially under the name Early Red Bird.
