= George Frederick Clarke =

Canadian author, historian and amateur archaeologist

- Born: December 29, 1883; Woodstock, New Brunswick
- Died: October 23, 1974 (aged 90); Woodstock, New Brunswick
- Resting place: Anglican Cemetery, Woodstock
- Occupation: dentist
- Known for: writing, environmental activism
- Spouse: Mary Schubert (m. 1912)

George Frederick Clarke (1883–1974) was a New Brunswick author, historian and amateur archaeologist.

== Biography ==
He was born in Woodstock, New Brunswick, in 1883. He started writing from an early age. His first published story appeared in Canada Monthly in 1904. Tappan Adney was one of his boyhood friends. He supported himself working as a dental assistant. In 1910, he attended a dental college in Philadelphia, where he met his wife, Mary Schubert. The two married in 1912. He graduated the next year. They returned to Woodstock and bought a house, on 814 Main Street, now considered a historic place.

He eventually retired from his dentistry practise. He wrote several books and many magazine articles. During the 1960s, he campaigned against the construction of the Mactaquac Dam. Poor health prevented him from continuing archaeology. He received an honorary degree from the University of New Brunswick in 1969, and a mountain was named after him in July 1974, Mount Frederick Clarke. In October 1974, he died of a stroke.

His house was formally recognized as a Provincial Historic Site on October 27, 1978.

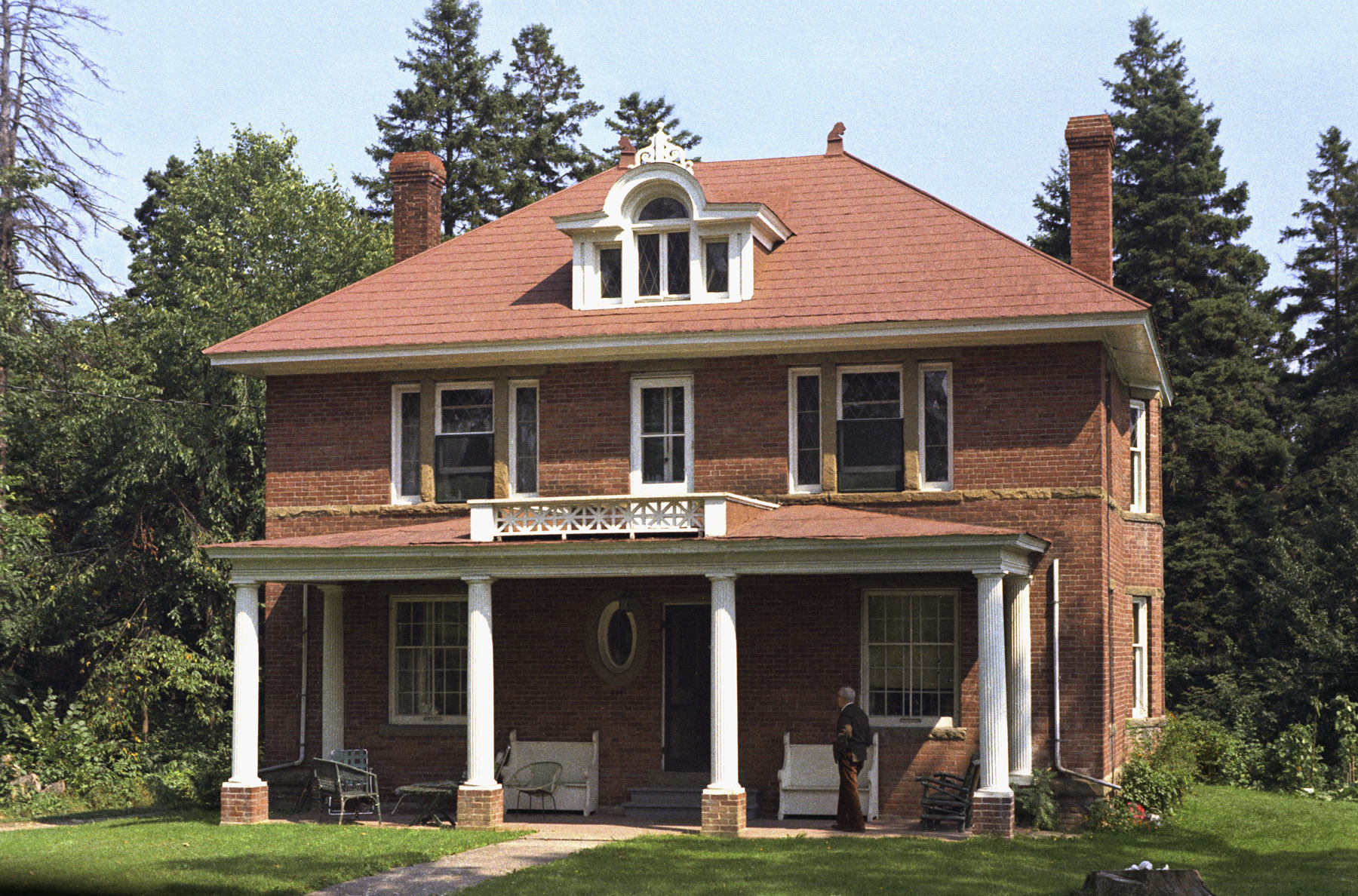
Dr. George Frederick Clarke House

== Bibliography ==
- The Magic Road, Mills & Boon (1925)
- Chris in Canada (1925)
- The Best One Thing (1926)
- Thetis Saxon Longmans (1927)
- The St John and Other Poems, Ryerson (1933)
- David Cameron's Adventures (1950)
- Return to Acadia (1952)
- The Adventures of Jimmy-Why (1954)
- Too Small a World: The Story of Acadia (1958)
- Noël and Jimmy-Why (1959)
- Six Salmon Rivers and Another (1963)
- The Song of the Reel (1960)
- The True Story of the Expulsion of the Acadians (1955)
- Someone Before Us: our Maritime Indians (1968)

Clarke also wrote for magazines such as the Canadian Home Journal and the Atlantic Advocate.
