= Dibblee =

Dibblee is a surname. Notable people by that name include:

- George Binney Dibblee (1868–1952), newspaperman and academic who was manager of the Manchester Guardian.
- Thomas Dibblee (1911–2004), American geologist.
- Benjamin Dibblee (1876–1945), American football player and coach.
- Allan Dibblee (1856–1915), hardware merchant and political figure in New Brunswick, Canada.
- Frederick Dibblee (1753–1826), Canadian Church of England clergyman.
