= Old Carleton County Court House =

Coordinates: 46.175641°N 67.575706°W

The Old Carleton County Court House is an 1833 court house in Upper Woodstock, New Brunswick, Canada.

The Courthouse was built in 1833. A new courthouse was constructed, obviating the need for the old one, which was used as a horse barn from 1911 until 1960 when it was purchased by the Carleton County Historical Society. It was designated as a protected heritage site in 1977.

It is open to the public Monday to Saturday from 11am-7pm from July 1 to August 31, Monday to Saturday, and at other times by appointment. The Victorian Christmas Concert is held here on the last weekend in November.

Renovation work on the roof was begun in December 2012.

== History ==
The George Gee trial was held here, as was that of Minnie Bell Sharp, wife of Edwin Tappan Adney.
