= New Brunswick (disambiguation) =

New Brunswick may refer to:

- New Brunswick, New Jersey, a city
  - New Brunswick station, New Jersey railroad station
- New Brunswick, Indiana, unincorporated town
- New Brunswick, a province of Canada
- 45557 New Brunswick, a British LMS Jubilee Class locomotive

== See also ==
- New Brunswicker (apple), an apple variety developed in 1854
- New Brunswick Southwest, federal electoral district in New Brunswick, Canada
- New Brunswick Railway, Canadian railway and land holding company
