= Mount Frederick Clarke =

- Location within New Brunswick

Highest point
- Elevation: 531 m (1,742 ft)
- Prominence: 160 m (520 ft)
- Listing: Mountains of New Brunswick
- Coordinates: 46°29′18″N 67°14′36″W

Geography
- Location: Carleton County, New Brunswick
- Parent range: New Brunswick Highlands
- Topo map: NTS 21J6 Coldstream

Mount Frederick Clarke is a mountain located east of Knowlesville, New Brunswick.

== Name origin ==
The mountain is named for Dr. George Frederick Clarke (1883-1974), a noted archaeologist, author and historian.

The name was bestowed in July 1974.
