= H.V. Dalling =

Canadian watchmaker, optician and inventor

H. V. Dalling
- Born: Horace Victor Dalling; February 5, 1854; Richmond, New Brunswick
- Died: January 6, 1931 (aged 76); Woodstock, New Brunswick
- Occupations: Watchmaker, retailer, inventor
- Years active: 1878-1929
- Known for: homemade telephone
- Spouse: Mary Isabella McKilligan (m. 1879; died 1927)
- Children: William Victor Dalling, Edith Dalling, 2 others

Horace Victor Dalling (1854–1931) was a Canadian watchmaker, jeweller, optician and inventor. He was the watch inspector for the Canadian Pacific Railway, and is also known for manufacturing the first two telephones in Woodstock, New Brunswick, which he placed in his store and in his home.

== Biography ==
Dalling was born in Richmond, New Brunswick on February 5, 1854, to Thomas M. and Matilda Jane (Gray) Dalling. In 1878 he moved to Woodstock and established his business, Dalling's Jewellery Store. In 1879 he married Mary Isabella McKilligan and the two had four children.

His store was damaged by fire on February 26, 1891. His losses ($150 (equivalent to $5,385 in 2025)) were covered by insurance.

In 1900, he donated a silver cup, known as the "Dalling Cup", for golf. Another cup, a gold-lined silver cup, was given in 1905 for the Woodstock Hockey League.

His son William Victor Dalling, fought in the First World War as a gunner. He was wounded in France on October 13, 1916, but died of pneumonia on October 19, 1918, contracted in Fredericton while waiting for his discharge.

Dalling continued to run his store until 1929, when he retired because of ill health. His daughter, Edith, ran the store until his death on January 6, 1931.

== Telephone ==
He is most remembered because of his homemade telephone, which he constructed in 1885 and ran between his home on Richmond St. and his store on Main St. He supported the wires by running them in the branches of trees alongside the streets. Telephones (either wires or instruments) were not yet common in the region.

Bell Telephone later investigated his setup and threatened him with a lawsuit for infringing on the company's patent. However, a compromise was reached and Bell opened a small telephone exchange of twenty lines in his store, of which he was the manager. Because there was no service at night or on Sundays, Dalling built and installed a miniature switchboard of eight lines at his home to answer important messages after hours.
