= G. Ernest Fairweather =

Canadian architect (1850–1920)

- Born: November 7, 1850; Saint John, New Brunswick, Canada
- Died: December 16, 1920 (aged 70); Saint John, New Brunswick, Canada
- Occupation: Architect
- Practice: Saint John, New Brunswick

G. Ernest Fairweather (November 7, 1850 – December 16, 1920) was a Canadian architect. While also he built residential structures, he is best known for his commercial buildings.

== Buildings ==
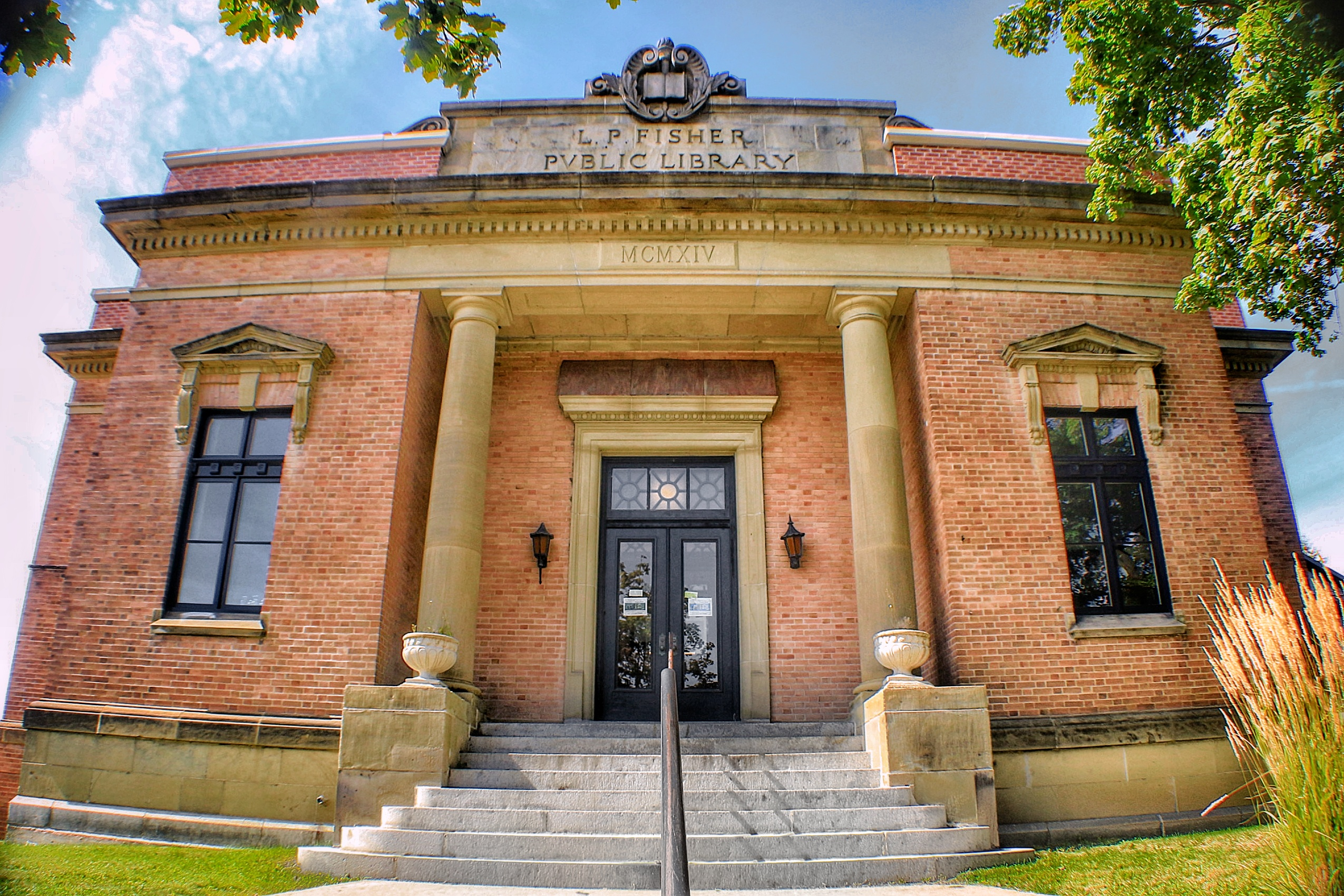
L.P. Fisher Public Library, Woodstock

=== Saint John ===
- 200 - 206 Germain Street
- 114 and 116 Wentworth Street
- Carnegie Building, one of the Carnegie libraries (1904), current home of the Saint John Arts Centre.
- Seaman's Mission, 152 Prince William (1908)[www.travelphotobase.com/c/NBJ/NBJ301.HTM]
- Old City Hall, 116 Prince William [www.travelphotobase.com/c/NBJ/NBJ272.HTM]
- King Edward VII Memorial Bandstand (two story)(1902)

=== Woodstock ===
- L. P. Fisher Public Library

=== Rothesay ===
- Memorial Chapel, Rothesay Netherwood School (1923) F. DeLancey Robinson also

=== Fredericton ===
- Old Civil Engineering Building at the University of New Brunswick Fredericton Campus (1900)
- Gymnasium at the University of New Brunswick Fredericton Campus (1906)
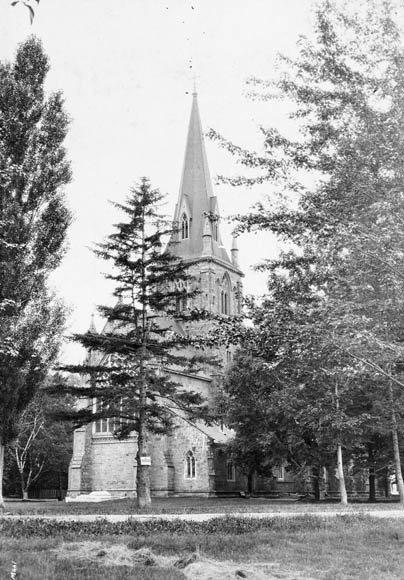
Christ Church Cathedral (Fredericton) alterations (1907). He made alterations to Bottreaux House for Bishop John A. Richardson (1907).
- 171 Church Street, Fredericton, a heritage designated residence designed by G. Ernst Fairweather in the Beaux Arts architectural style and built in 1906 for Dr. William Crockett contains impressive woodwork, large arched doorways, high ceilings and the city's most stunning stained glass windows.
