= L. P. Fisher Public Library =

Coordinates: 46°09′05″N 67°34′24″W

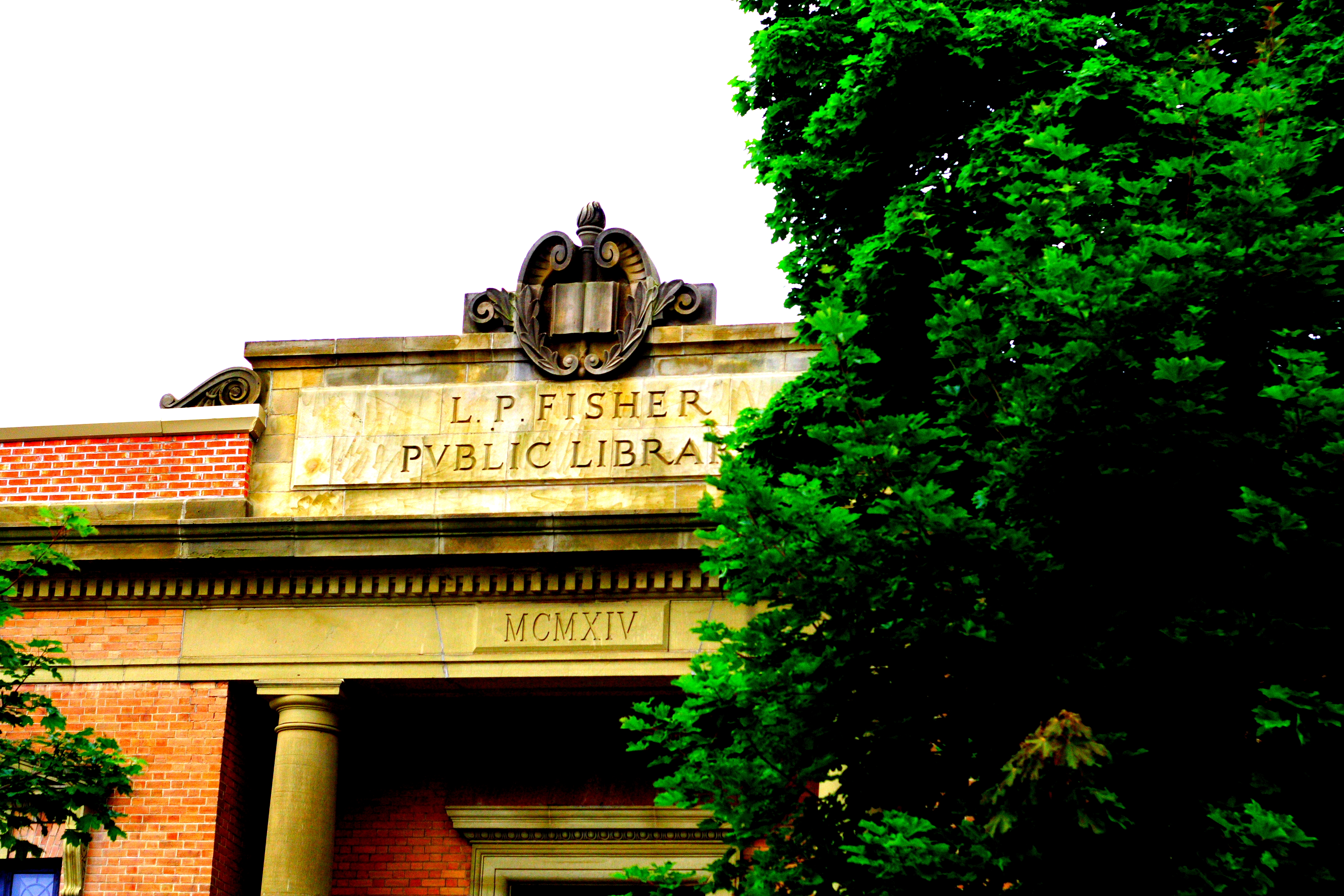
- L. P. Fisher Public Library
- Type: Public Library in Woodstock, New Brunswick
- Established: 1912
- Architect: G. Ernest Fairweather

Collection
- Items collected: Books, journals, newspapers, sound recordings, databases, maps, drawings

Access and use
- Access requirements: New Brunswick library card

Other information
- Director: Jennifer Carson
- Employees: Four (~one summer student)
- Website: New Brunswick Public Library Service

The L. P. Fisher Public Library, started in 1912 and completed in 1914, is a landmark in the town of Woodstock, New Brunswick, Canada. Named for Lewis Peter Fisher (1821-1905), a loyalist lawyer, mayor, and leading citizen of Woodstock who bequeathed $208,000 for local charitable purposes, including the construction of a free library.

The library was designed in a Greek Revival style by architect G. Ernest Fairweather of Saint John, New Brunswick and after two years of construction was completed in 1914. The exterior is brick with limestone trim, and the interior is furnished in Honduran mahogany. There is a time capsule buried in the cornerstone. The front steps are of granite, as are the foundations of the building.

The historical collections of the library include 19th century census records, maps, newspapers, family histories, military and cemetery records.

An expansion and restructuring of the library began in 2013 and was completed in 2015.

== Statistics (1999-2000) ==
- Size: 546 m^{2} (5877 square feet)
- Total Collection: 26,253 volumes
- Annual Circulation: 79,901 volumes

== Significant holdings ==
- Census 1851, 1871 and 1891 in hard copies for the area.
- On microfilm the census for 1851, 1861, 1871, 1881, 1891 and 1901.
- Marriage records for Carleton and York Counties
- Set of Dan Johnston's "Vital Statistics from NB Brunswick Newspapers" 1784-1890
- 1876 Map of Carleton County naming all the homes and businesses
- Carleton Sentinel 1849–present and Dispatch 1894-1919 (local papers) on microfilm
- Muster Roll of the Carleton Light Dragoons, 1840.
- Index to the Carleton Sentinel
- RC records on microfilm
- Families histories of Campbell, Collicott, Dibblee, Dow, Faulkner, Feero, Fisher, Flowers, Folwer, Gallagher, Grant, Joyall, Kinney, Lonstaff, Morehouse, Nicholson, Orser, Perry, Price, Raymond, Sharp, Shaw, Snow, Stoddard, Tompkins, Tomsom.
- Extensive cemetery records

== The library in popular media ==
The building is seen in the 2000 movie Ricky 6. The facade was temporarily altered to feature a different name and an American flag was flown from the flagpole. The interior was also altered and repainted for use in the film; however upon the completion of principal photography, the producers of the movie arranged for the interior furnishings to be left in better condition than they had been before the start of production.
