= Charles Connell House =

Present Name of the residence of the Hon

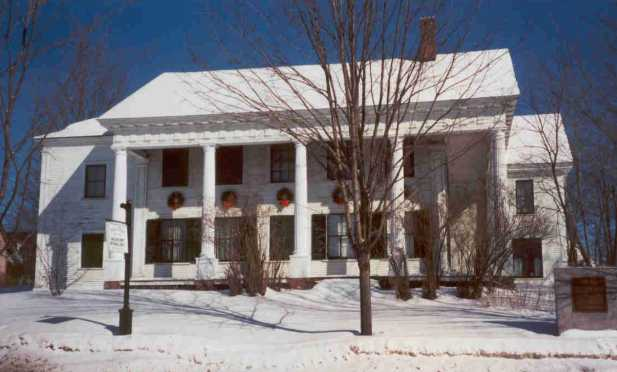
- The Charles Connell House in winter
- Interactive map of Charles Connell House
- Coordinates: 46.1511°N 67.5751°W
- Location: 128 Connell Street, Woodstock, New Brunswick

History
- Built: c. 1839
- Original use: Private home
- Current use: Society headquarters, museum

Site notes
- Architectural style: Greek Revival
- Governing body: Carleton County Historical Society
- Website: www.cchsnb.ca

National Historic Site of Canada
- Designated: 1975

The Charles Connell House, located in Woodstock, New Brunswick, Canada, was the residence of politician Charles Connell. The house was designated a National Historic Site in 1975.

== History ==
This house was built by an unknown person circa 1839 for Connell. It represents the peak of classicism in local architecture. It was built in the Greek Revival style, where wood is used to imitate the look of stone.

=== Past use ===
In the late 19th and early 20th century, it was divided into apartments. It was made into a double tenement in the 1890s, and further subdivided into three apartments circa 1920, with a fourth created about 1960.

=== Current use ===
The house was purchased by the Carleton County Historical Society in 1975, and is currently used to house the society's archives, artifacts and office. A restoration of the layout of the house, before it was broken up into apartments, was completed in 2008.

The Connell House is also available for business meetings, weddings, receptions, and parties for a small fee. The Connell House is fully licensed and has a fully stocked caterer's kitchen.
