= Woodstock Iron Works =

The Woodstock Iron Works ran from 1848 to 1884 and was located in what is now Upper Woodstock, New Brunswick, Canada. In its prime, the iron ore that came from the works was thought to be some of the highest quality ore. The Iron works was closed in 1884 due to increased competition from the United States.

== Discovery ==
While there were suggestions that settlers around the Woodstock area had recognized iron deposits in the surrounding landscape in approximately 1820, it was not until sixteen years later in 1836 that Dr. Jackson of Boston, who was on a geological survey conducted by the state of Maine, confirmed the presence of iron ore. The ore was immediately recognized as high quality with great potential. Dr. Jackson allegedly identified it as a compact red haematite, the mineral form of iron that can range in colours from black and silver to red. The ore was said to be able to produce a yield of 44 percent pure iron or 50 percent cast iron, and one cubic foot of the iron would weigh approximately 200 pounds. Surveyors speculated that there was roughly 45,000,000 cubic feet of ore, which translated into about 225,000,000 pounds worth of iron that could be mined from the area.

== Mining Company ==
In 1837, local residents petitioned the provincial government asking to incorporate a mining company in order to harvest and explore the economic potential of the ore. It took the provincial government ten years of study and examining until the York and Carleton Mining Company Bill was passed, thus permitting the company (The Woodstock Charcoal Iron Company) owned by Mr. Norris Best and Mr. Ellis Smith to construct roads and obtain woodland among other necessities in order to create and maintain a functioning iron works. Then in 1848 the first of two blast furnaces was erected on the western bank of the Saint John River near the mouth of Lanes Creek. The first furnace was thirty seven feet in height and thirty three feet wide at its base being constructed of sandstone. The crucible, which is where the ore was melted, was three feet six inches by four feet and was six feet high, the capacity of this first furnace was approximately seven tons per day, later on a smaller second furnace was constructed which had a production capacity of around five and a half tons per day. The main fuel of the blast furnaces was hardwood charcoal, which was obtained from local wood lots mainly consisting of maple, birch and beech trees. There were ten charcoal kilns located on the premises of the iron works and each had an approximate capacity of seventy five cord of wood which would yield between 2,800 and 3,200 bushels of charcoal. It took three tons of ore to produce one ton of "pig" Iron, which is the most basic form of processed iron, and one hundred and twenty six bushels of charcoal were required to produce one ton of the pig iron the annual capacity of pig iron produced was 2150 tonnes, which was enough to plate two naval frigates from the time period. The Dispatch, a local paper in 1898, stated that in 1864 12,000 cords of wood were used in the production of iron in Woodstock, this was enough wood to have cleared four hundred acres of woodland.

== Employment ==
The mines employed roughly seventy five men in the mines and at the furnaces, ten to twelve teams of men and horses were employed hauling ore to the furnaces, using wagons in the summer and sleds in the winter months. The iron works further generated employment by employing over one hundred and fifty men to harvest wood and another sixty teams of horses and men to haul the wood to the charcoal kilns in order to be processed. In addition to these employees, more workers were used to transport the finished product to Richmond station to be shipped to Saint Andrews, New Brunswick, loaded onto schooners then sailed to Saint John, New Brunswick, and then from there shipped to England.

== Quality ==
The quality of iron from the Woodstock mines was world-renowned in its day as being one of the best quality irons available of the time. During the first provincial exhibition held in Saint John in 1851 the report issued from the commissioners stated that the Woodstock iron appeared to be of top quality having bent and twisted the iron, while cold, in multiple directions there was no visible damage to the fiber. The most famed tale of Woodstock's iron and its impressive quality is that in 1865 the English Admiralty instituted several experiments at Shoeburyness England in order test the resistance of iron plate against heavy ordnance, allegedly in the trial every plate of iron was shattered by the shot fired at it, except for one triple plate made from the Woodstock iron, this piece only sustained an indent, this caused an immediate interest in the product. Several more tests followed and resulted in great success. The success of the Woodstock iron was attributed to the smelting process which allegedly allowed for more carbon to be absorbed into the final product.

== Closure ==
In 1884, competition from newly discovered deposits in the United States paired with the increasing cost of transportation and the scarcity of fuel caused the Woodstock iron works operation to close, after having mined and smelted approximately seventy thousand tons of iron ore between its opening in 1848 and its closure in 1884.
