= George Gee (murderer) =

Gee

George William Gee (16 June 1881 – 22 July 1904) was a Canadian murderer and the first person to be hanged in the town of Woodstock, New Brunswick. He was tried for the murder of Millie Gee, his cousin and ex-lover. The trial took place in the Old Carleton County Court House, and he was hanged in the Woodstock Gaol.

== The murder ==
George and Millie had been seeing each other for three or four years, when Millie lost interest and asked him not to see her anymore. Shortly thereafter, she was hired to look after the house and children of Bennie Gee because his wife had left him. She stayed in the house next door with Bennie's sister Catherine and her husband Daniel Crane.

On Saturday, 12 March 1904, George arrived at Bennie's residence with a Lee–Enfield Rifle that he had borrowed from a Lt. Weldon W. Melville. He had been drinking steadily for most of the afternoon, but was friendly enough when he arrived, and left the rifle at the door. He stayed late, playing cards with Bennie and continuing to drink until three in the morning, when George announced that he should leave and was helped to the door by Millie.

As he was going out he uttered his later famous words, "I suppose you don't know that this is the night you're going to die." He then turned around, picked up the rifle and fired. The bullet ricocheted off the frame of the door and entered Millie's chest, knocking her to the floor.

Hearing the shot, Bennie ran to the door. George fired twice in his direction but missed. He then fled. After a time he walked the long distance to a phone and called Dep. Sheriff Foster to turn himself in.

Three doctors were called to attend Millie, but they could not save her life. She died the following Wednesday a short time after giving her deposition to Dep. Sheriff Foster.

== The trial ==
After a preliminary hearing, the trial was set for 26 April 1904 with Judge Tucker presiding. Attorney General Pugsley was for the Crown. J. Chipman Hartley and T C L Ketchum were for the defense.

Gee pleaded not guilty and the calling of witnesses began. In all, 23 were called, most of them close friends and relatives. In his closing arguments Ketchum pleaded with the jury that Gee was insane, drunk, and too poor to mount a proper defense. He claimed a charge of manslaughter would be more appropriate. His full argument lasted a full hour and left Gee in tears.

The crown argued that the crime was premeditated and that Gee couldn't have been insane, as he had obviously realized his crime when he turned himself in.

The jury deliberated for only 45 minutes before they returned a verdict of guilty. Judge Tucker sentenced Gee to hang on the grounds of the (then) new jail.

== The execution ==
The hanging went forward as planned, on July 22, although there was a delay for the rope to be shipped in from out of town, since no one from the town would sell it. He was baptized into the Adventist Church before his death. The executioner, Radcliffe, was swift in the hanging, and the rope snapped Gee's neck. He was pronounced dead 12 minutes afterward. George Gee is buried in the same grave as Millie Gee, and they have a plaque together. They are buried in the Gee Flat Cemetery in Bath, New Brunswick.
