= Minnie Bell Sharp =

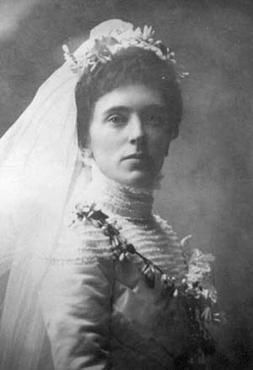
- Minnie Bell Sharp Adney in her wedding dress in 1899
- Born: January 12, 1865
- Died: April 11, 1937 (aged 72); Woodstock, New Brunswick
- Occupation(s): music teacher, businesswoman
- Known for: first New Brunswick woman to run in a Canadian federal election
- Spouse: Tappan Adney
- Children: one son
- Father: Francis Peabody Sharp

Minnie Bell Sharp Adney (January 12, 1865 – April 11, 1937) was a Canadian music teacher and businesswoman. From childhood on she was actively involved in her family's orchard and nursery business. She owned and operated music schools in Victoria, British Columbia and Woodstock, New Brunswick. She was the first New Brunswick woman ever to run in a Canadian federal election.

== Family, early life and education ==
She was born in Upper Woodstock, New Brunswick, one of eight children of Francis Peabody Sharp and his wife Maria Shaw. Their first three children had all died of diphtheria within one week in 1861. Minnie Bell was the eldest of three sisters. She had one older brother and one younger.

Her father, a noted experimental pomologist, owned orchards and fruit nurseries which grew to be the largest in Canada by 1890. Minnie Bell Sharp later described her childhood and youth as "a glorious life" and her family's home as "a veritable fairyland". She recalled having "an unlimited capacity for hard work" and being "up at daylight packing and shipping apples and plums" during the harvest season.

She was educated mainly by her mother, with one year spent at Compton Ladies' College, an Anglican boarding school in the Eastern Townships of Quebec, when she was 14. Later she attended St. Margaret's Hall school in Halifax, where she excelled in music. Encouraging her musical development, her father purchased the first Steinway piano in New Brunswick

During most winters between 1883 or 1884 and 1890 she studied voice and piano in New York City. The composer and pianist William Mason was one of her teachers.

== Career ==
She taught music in Woodstock, New Brunswick and organized local concerts in which her students performed, on one occasion joined by friends of Sharp's from Fredericton and New York. She also organized concerts in Saint John, New Brunswick and Houlton and Calais, Maine.

In 1893 she purchased the business name and goodwill of the Victoria Conservatory of Music at Victoria, British Columbia for $1200, of which $700 was in cash and the remaining $500 in the form of a promissory note. She took possession of the conservatory in September 1893 and remained its principal until 1900. It was the largest music school in the city, with as many as 60 students and 5 staff in addition to Sharp and her assistant Beth Walker, who had studied with Sharp in New York. Sharp taught voice and piano; other subjects taught included music theory and history, sight-singing by the sol-fa method, violin, elocution and languages (French, Italian and German). The conservatory regularly presented student recitals and benefit concerts in which Sharp and other teachers participated.

The Sharp family businesses in New Brunswick were losing money due to a combination of factors including the effect of the protectionist McKinley Tariff introduced in the United States in 1890, the death in 1892 from tuberculosis of Francis Peabody Sharp's son Franklin, who had taken over the businesses from his father, and the devastation of the plum orchard by an unusually cold winter in the following year. In order to assist her parents and unmarried sister, Minnie Bell Sharp sent money home, and went into debt to do so. She also spent the summer and fall of every year but 1894 and 1895 in New Brunswick helping with the fruit harvest and sale.

In 1897, while she was home for the summer, the Woodstock school district trustees presented her with a bill for back taxes owed by the Sharp orchards. She refused to pay the full amount of the bill, on the grounds that the property's value had declined. She was then arrested and spent 17 days in jail. She was released after she realized that she was not subject to arrest because she was a non-resident, a fact that she learned by reading the New Brunswick statutes while in jail. The lawyers for the school trustees said that they were unaware of this exemption. She sued the school trustees for $2,500 for false imprisonment. She won the case but was awarded only $1. She appealed the amount and a second trial took place in April 1900, in which she was awarded damages of $75.

After her marriage to Tappan Adney in Woodstock in September 1899 she returned to Victoria late in the year. She left for New Brunswick in April 1900 after closing the conservatory. In the same year she opened the Woodstock School of Music, which she ran for the next 20 years. She also led choral groups for adults and children.

Between 1906 and 1916 Minnie Bell Sharp Adney and her husband worked together to revive the Sharp nursery and orchard businesses, but they were ultimately unsuccessful.

== Political candidacy ==
In 1919, Minnie Bell Sharp Adney announced her candidacy as an Independent for the federal constituency of Victoria—Carleton in a by-election to fill the seat vacated by the resignation of Frank Broadstreet Carvell. She declared that she would support the government in office and would "work first for justice and the people; for an adequate recompense for our wonderful soldier boys", "for the children of our land", "for our common cause, without destruction of classes or creeds or the drawing of stringent political lines, for the good of all, the public weal and humanity". Her name did not appear on the ballot because she was late filing her nomination papers.

In the general election of 1921 she again put her name forward, offering her support to the Liberal Party. Among the items in her platform were "more pay for the soldiers", "mothers' bonus such as obtains in Ontario", and "return to old high license of a liquor law or such a system as Quebec or British Columbia have, whereby the national debt could be liquidated in two years". On this occasion she presented her nomination papers on time but did not have the $200 deposit required to file the papers.

In the general election of 1925, her name appeared on the ballot as an independent candidate. Her nomination papers were filed and a $200 deposit was paid by an "agent", Helen McKibbin. She was the first woman ever nominated in a federal election in New Brunswick. The seat was won by the Conservative candidate James Kidd Flemming. Minnie Bell Adney, whose campaign slogan was "By their fruits ye shall know them", received 84 votes.

== Personal life ==
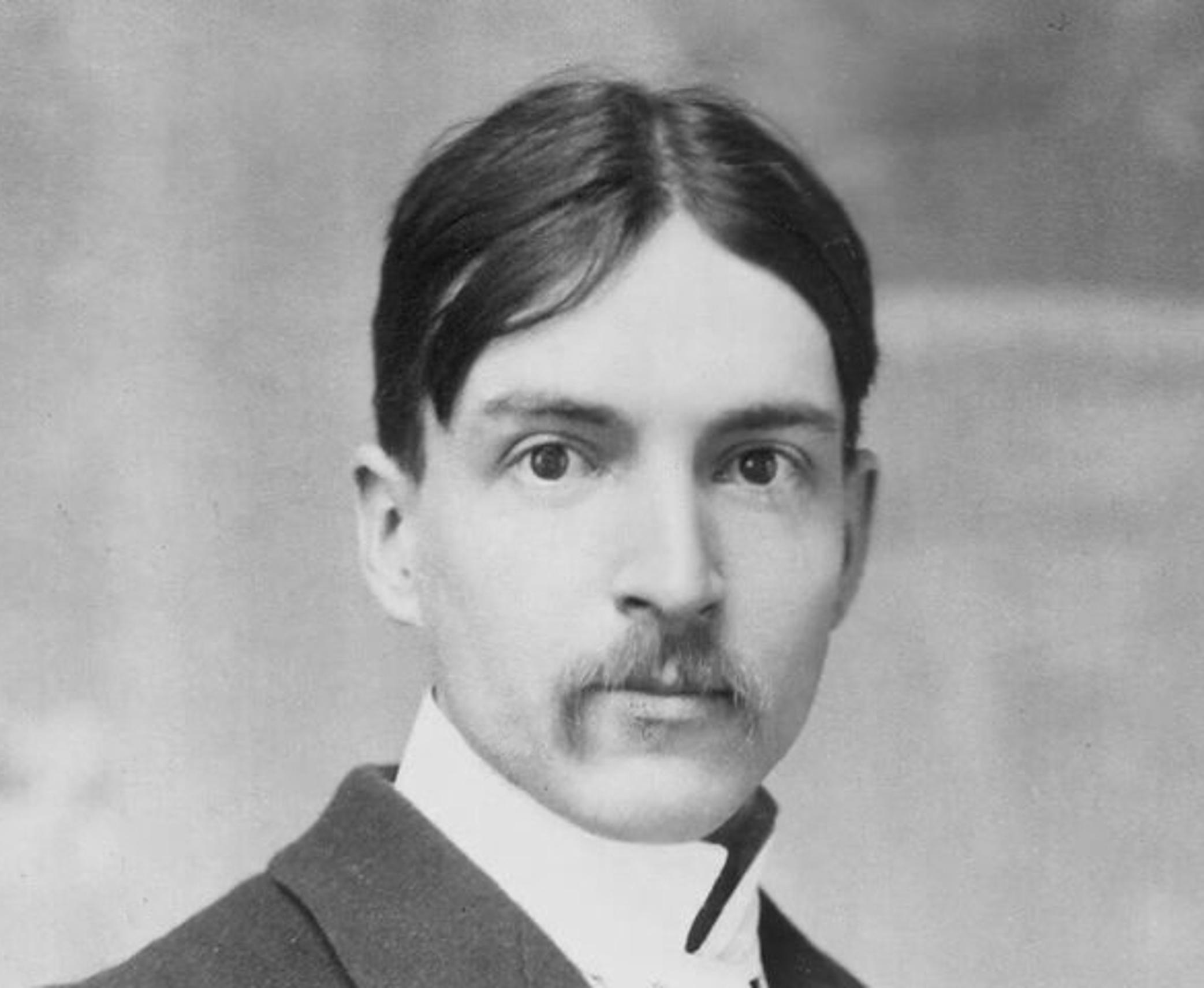
Tappan Adney in about 1890

On 12 September 1899, Sharp married Tappan Adney in Woodstock. While studying in New York she had stayed at a boarding house in Manhattan that was owned by Ruth Shaw Adney. At her invitation Mrs. Adney's son Tappan and daughter Mary Ruth visited the Sharp family in New Brunswick in the summer of 1887. Tappan Adney remained in New Brunswick until the fall of 1889 and returned several times in the following decade. Mary Ruth Adney worked with Sharp at the conservatory in Victoria from 1893 to 1896 and Tappan Adney visited the city for five months in 1895.

Minnie Bell and Tappan Adney had one child, Francis Glenn Adney (called Glenn). He was born in Woodstock in 1902. He attended McGill University in Montreal on scholarships and earned a Bachelor of Science degree in Mathematics in 1923. He played the piano, and worked as a jazz musician and dance band leader in Montreal. He worked as an actuary for the Metropolitan Life Insurance Company in New York from the early 1930s until he retired in 1966. He died in 1983 in Ramsey, New Jersey, where he had lived for 50 years.

She suffered from Fuchs' dystrophy, a degenerative eye disease, and became blind in the last years of her life. In 1933 she and her husband returned to Woodstock from Verdun, Quebec, where they had been living. Minnie Bell Sharp Adney died on 11 April, 1937. She is buried in the Upper Woodstock Cemetery with her husband, who died in 1950.
