= Anthony Flower =

Canadian artist (1792–1875)

Anthony Flower (1792–1875) was a Canadian artist.

== Career ==
Flower was born in London, England on March 4, 1792, the son of merchant mariner Cornelius Flower and Margaret Nicholson. Anthony Flower arrived in the New World in the fall of 1817 on his father's ship the Trent. By the spring of 1818 he was the owner of farmland on the banks of the Washademoak Lake at MacDonald's Corner, Queens County, New Brunswick. There he built a small frame house. In 1820 he married Mary Green, a local woman and the daughter of Loyalists James Green and Elizabeth Carpenter. Anthony and Mary had four children: Cornelius, Margaret, James and Mary. Mary Green Flower, "his dear dear", died September 13, 1867, at six o'clock in the evening. Anthony Flower continued to farm and paint until his sudden death, Thursday, December 9, 1875, at the home of his friend, Brother William Briggs. He is buried in the MacDonald's Corner Baptist Church Cemetery.

Anthony Flower painted throughout his life. It is clear he had some training in art and was painting before he left England. His earliest surviving work, a watercolour, was painted when he was twelve. His primary medium was watercolour but by the 1840s he was beginning to experiment with oils. He used papers of various sizes and quality, painted some works on wood or leather as well as canvas, and sometimes resorted to using both sides of the paper. Some of his later works also include carved frames and paintings on board with elaborately carved details to enhance the subject. His palette at any one time was relatively limited, and his work can sometimes be dated by noting the colours he used. The numerous portraits of his family and friends indicate the prominent role they played in his life. His landscapes and portrait copies reveal a keen intellect and a curiosity about the world around him.

In 2006, an exhibition of his works, some 200 in all, was exhibited at the Beaverbrook Art Gallery and subsequently traveled to other venues in Atlantic Canada. The works include landscapes of his own and neighbouring farms, and portraits of family members. As one of the rare regional artists to emerge from nineteenth century New Brunswick, his work "opens a window on a time and place now gone".

His house was restored by Queens County Heritage and opened to the public in 2008. The Anthony Flower House Museum & Gallery tells the story of a family, community and province through two centuries. The story of Anthony Flower as an artist, a farmer, a father, an immigrant, and a community leader reflects the broader history of New Brunswick and Canada. The only inhabitants of the house were Anthony Flower's descendants and their wives, with the last resident being James H. Flower who used it as a summer home for several decades. In 2002 it was donated to Queens County Heritage and subsequently moved to its current site in Arcadia in 2003. Queens County Heritage has the largest collection of Anthony Flower's paintings in a public institution and the parlour of his house has been refurbished as a small art gallery to feature selections of his work.
