= R. Fraser Armstrong =

Roy Fraser Armstrong
- Born: October 8, 1889; St. Andrews, New Brunswick
- Died: October 11, 1986 (aged 97); Kingston, Ontario
- Education: University of New Brunswick; McGill University
- Occupations: Hospital administrator and civil engineer

Roy Fraser Armstrong (October 8, 1889 – October 11, 1986) was a Canadian hospital administrator and engineer who served as the Superintendent of Kingston General Hospital from 1925 to 1957.

== Early life ==
Armstrong was born on October 8, 1889, in St. Andrews, New Brunswick, to Robert Edwin and Margaret Patterson Armstrong. In 1910 he graduated from the University of New Brunswick with a Bachelor of Science degree in Civil Engineering. From 1911 to 1915, he was a municipal consultant in Western Canada. From 1913 to 1914, he took post-graduate courses in applied science at McGill University. In 1915, he was appointed engineer and superintendent of water and sewer in Saint John, New Brunswick.

== Military ==
Armstrong enlisted in the Canadian Expeditionary Force on May 4, 1916. He was appointed lieutenant in the 65th Battery of the Canadian Field Artillery. He was later transferred to the 14th Brigade. In France, Armstrong served as an engineer. His duty was to ensure that the Canadian Expeditionary Force received an adequate supply of water. In 1918 he was awarded the Military Cross at a ceremony in Buckingham Palace for distinguished action under enemy fire.

== Town manager and consulting ==
In 1919, Armstrong became the first Town Manager of Woodstock, New Brunswick. In 1923 he married Muriel Smith of Woodstock. They had two children. That same year he went to work for the Citizens Research Institute of Canada, where he was employed as a consultant for public and industrial groups, including hospitals. His consulting work involved making administrative surveys and playing an active role in administrative reorganization. In 1924 he was appointed acting Superintendent of Victoria Hospital in London, Ontario. He later returned to municipal management as Town Manager of Windsor, Nova Scotia.

== Kingston General Hospital ==
In 1924, Kingston General Hospital suffered from a number of personnel and management problems. Based on the recommendation of Dr. Horace Brittain, the hospital's Board of Governors decided to appoint someone with an administrative background rather than a medical one to run the hospital. Brittain also recommended that Armstrong be interviewed for the position. In March 1925, Armstrong was appointed Superintendent of Kingston General Hospital.

Armstrong was able to balanced the hospital's budget while maintaining and adding new services. He led the hospital through the Great Depression and World War II. Due to decreasing patient incomes during the Depression, Armstrong developed the Community Cooperative Group Hospital Plan, Ontario's first public health insurance plan. To help offset the reduction of rates caused by the Depression, In 1932, Armstrong and the entire hospital staff donated five percent of the salaries to the hospital. In 1942 he introduced a ten-year plan to expand the hospital. The expansion included the construction of the Victory Wing, which included the first cancer clinic in Ontario, a dietary wing, the Walter T. Connell Wing, and a children’s hospital. Armstrong retired from KGH in 1957, but stayed on as a consultant until the construction projects were completed.

While at KGH, Armstrong was president of the Ontario Hospital Association and the Canadian Hospital Association, as well as was a fellow of the American College of Hospital Administrators.

== Later life and death ==
After his retirement, Armstrong became a member of the Board of Governors of Kingston General Hospital. In 1976 KGH's outpatient building, the Fraser Armstrong Patient Centre, was named in his honor. He also worked as a representative of the Montreal Trust Company.

In September 1983, Armstrong moved into a retirement home in Kingston, Ontario. He died on October 11, 1986, from burns he suffered in a fire at the retirement home. He was 97 years old.
