= Carleton County Historical Society =

The Carleton County Historical Society (CCHS), located in southwest New Brunswick, Canada, was established in 1960.

It maintains an extensive collection of historical artifacts and archival material. They maintain two historic buildings, the Old Carleton County Court House, 19 Court Street, Upper Woodstock, and the Honourable Charles Connell House, 128 Connell Street, Woodstock, which doubles as the society's headquarters and as a museum.

President: John Thompson Executive Director: Kellie Blue-McQuade
