= Frederick Dibblee =

Frederick Dibblee (9 December 1753 – 17 May 1826) was a Canadian Church of England clergyman who also was an educator and diarist.

== Early life ==
He was born in Stamford, Connecticut. A Tory sympathiser during the American Revolutionary War, he was mistreated by the rebels and so decided to leave the United States. In 1784, he moved to what would become the new province of New Brunswick and finally settled in Woodstock, New Brunswick, in 1788.

== Educator ==
In 1787 he was sent to Woodstock Parish by the Company for Propagation of the Gospel in New England and the parts adjacent in America (commonly called the New England Company) to run a school for the Wolastoqiyik (Maliseet) Indians. This school was one of a number established by the company, whose aim was to convert the Indians from Roman Catholicism and to teach them both the English language and a trade. His efforts met with moderate success. By 1790 he had built a log schoolhouse 26 feet by 22 feet and on 4 January of that year he had 22 students, adults as well as children. "They are Constant in their Attendance," he wrote, "and exceeding quick in receiving Instruction, five of them in Particular are amazing so, having made great Improvement both in Spelling and Writing." He made some progress in the Indians’ language, though reportedly hindered by "a necessary attention to his Farm, in order to subsist his family." Two years later, however, the New England Company decided to centralize its efforts elsewhere, so his schools were closed.

Dibblee’s interest in education remained. In his letters to the Company he frequently requested aid for schools and schoolmasters and asked that books be sent out to them. By 1822 there were in his large district ten of the Madras schools, or National schools, promoted by Lieutenant Governor George Stracey Smyth; they averaged about 40 students each.

== Cleric ==
In 1791, Frederick Dibblee travelled to Halifax to be ordained a deacon, and the next year, he was raised to the priesthood in Saint John. He was given the four large parishes of Prince William, Queensbury, Northampton, and Woodstock, where he lived. He also visited the military settlements north of Woodstock, the first clergyman, he said, to do so.

== Diarist ==
Frederick Dibblee kept diaries from 1803 to his death in 1826, which survived, and are stored in the archives of the New Brunswick Museum in Saint John. They give a rich commentary on the agricultural and social conditions of the central Saint John River valley during the loyalist era. They include an account of the weather conditions of 1816, and the effect it had on farms and crops on the area. This was the year known as the Year Without a Summer which caused major food shortages across the Northern Hemisphere.
