= Tantramar Heritage Trust =

Organization

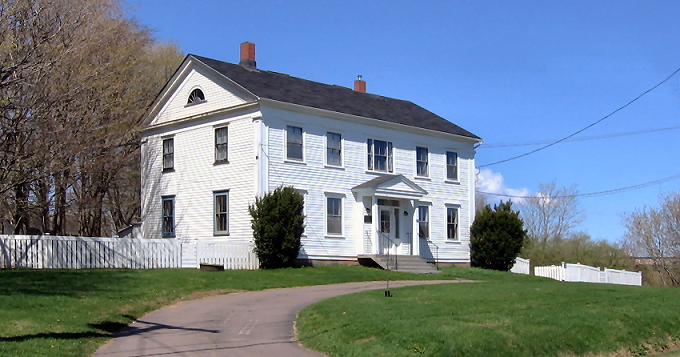
The Boultenhouse Heritage Centre was officially opened by the Tantramar Heritage Trust in September 2006. The building commemorates one of the early shipbuilders of the region, Christopher Boultenhouse, whose home this was.

The Tantramar Heritage Trust is a non-profit charity that promotes the preservation of heritage buildings, artefacts and lands in an area of south-east New Brunswick along the Nova Scotia border known as the "Tantramar". This region, which is centred on Sackville, New Brunswick and Amherst, Nova Scotia is characterised by an ecologically significant coastal lowland known as the Tantramar Marshes, which encompasses the Tintamarre National Wildlife Area.

The trust publishes a number of pamphlets and books related to the history of the area and also operates two museums: the Campbell Carriage Factory in Middle Sackville and the Boultenhouse Heritage Centre in Sackville. The Campbell Carriage Factory Museum (constructed 1838) in Sackville, New Brunswick is designated a Provincial Heritage Place under the Heritage Conservation Act.
