= New Brunswicker (apple) =

Apple cultivar

- Genus: Malus
- Species: Malus pumila
- Cultivar: 'New Brunswicker'
- Origin: New Brunswick, Canada

The New Brunswicker (also known as Sharp's New Brunswick Apple and Duchess of New Brunswick) is a domestic apple cultivar developed in the 19th century by Francis Peabody Sharp for colder climates such as Eastern Canada. It is an all-purpose apple suitable for fresh eating and baking, but it does not store well.
