= Tappan Adney =

American journalist

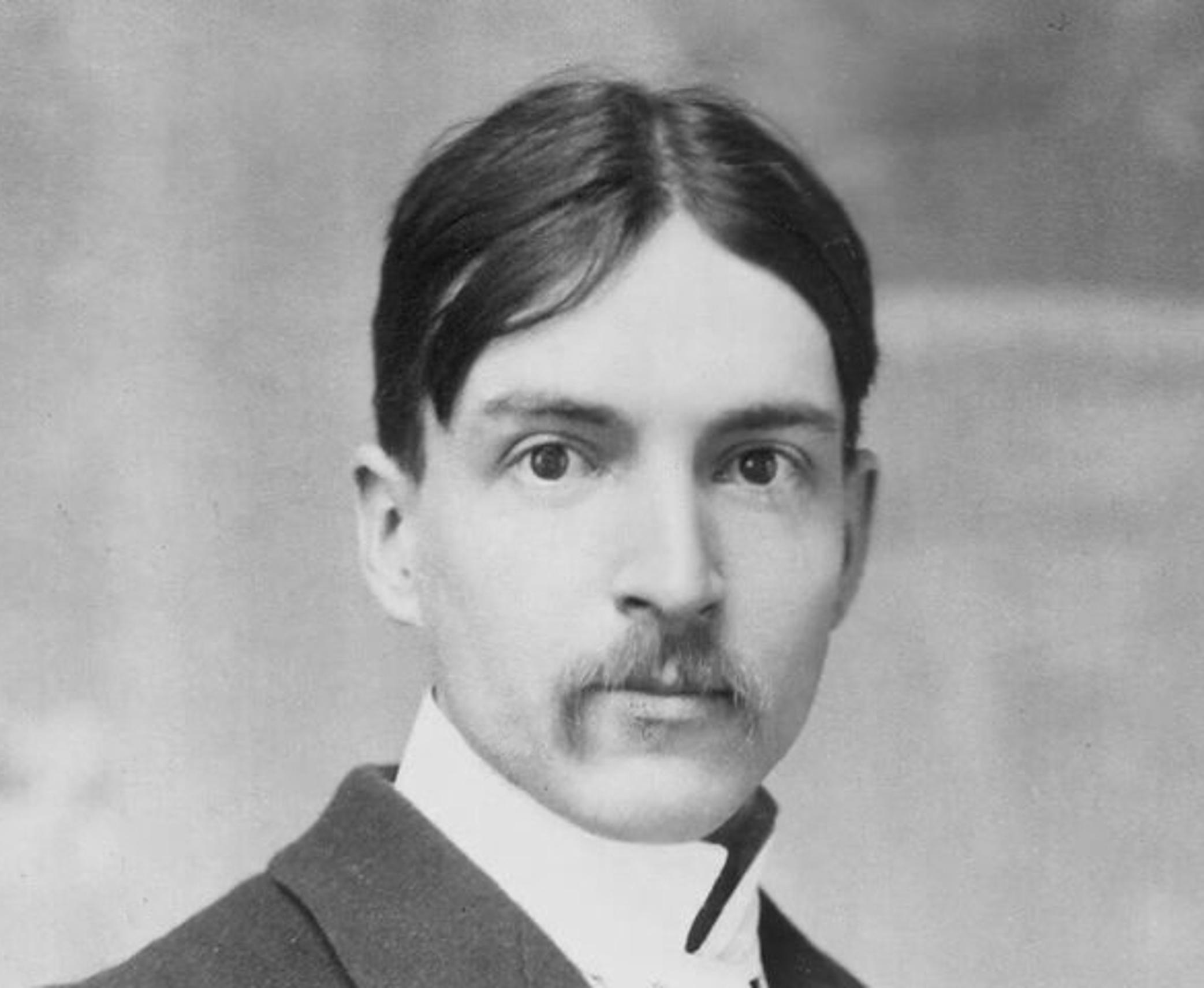
- Tappan Adney c. 1890
- Born: Edwin Tappan Adney; July 13, 1868; Athens, Ohio, United States
- Died: October 10, 1950 (aged 82); Woodstock, New Brunswick, Canada
- Resting place: Upper Woodstock Cemetery
- Citizenship: United States (by birthplace), British subject (1917)
- Notable work: The Klondike Stampede
- Spouse: Minnie Bell Sharp (m. 1899)
- Children: Francis Glenn Adney (b. 1902)

Edwin Tappan Adney (July 13, 1868 – October 10, 1950), commonly known as Tappan Adney, was an American-Canadian artist, writer, and photographer.

== Biography ==
Edwin Tappan Adney was born in Athens, Ohio, the eldest child of William Harvey Glenn Adney (1834–1885) from Vinton, Ohio, a professor at Ohio University, and Ruth Clementine Shaw Adney. When Tappan was five, the family moved to Washington, Pennsylvania where his father taught at Washington and Jefferson College. In 1879, his father retired from that position for health reasons and bought a tobacco farm near Pittsboro, North Carolina named Gum Spring Plantation. Tappan was exceptionally bright and entered the University of North Carolina at Chapel Hill at the age of thirteen, where he remained for two years.

== New York ==
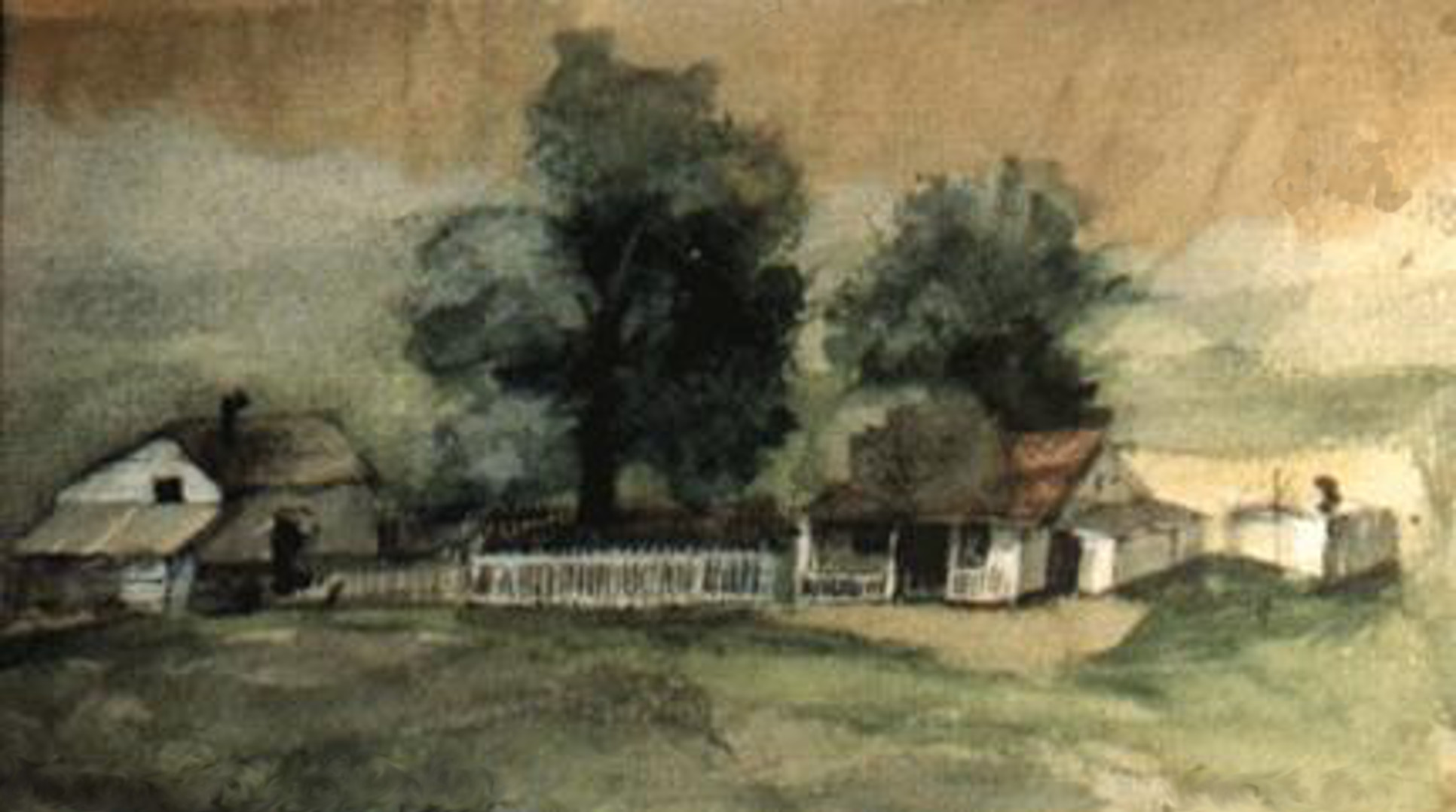
Watercolor, painted for the entrance examination for the Art Students League 1883

After his father's death in a farm accident, his mother took him and his younger sister Mary Ruth to New York City to further their education. To earn a living, she ran a boarding house, where Tappan got to know his future wife Minnie Bell Sharp of Woodstock, New Brunswick, a piano and singing student, who was one of his mother's tenants. Tappan attended Trinity School and after leaving school he worked in a law office. In the evenings he took art classes at the Art Students League of New York.

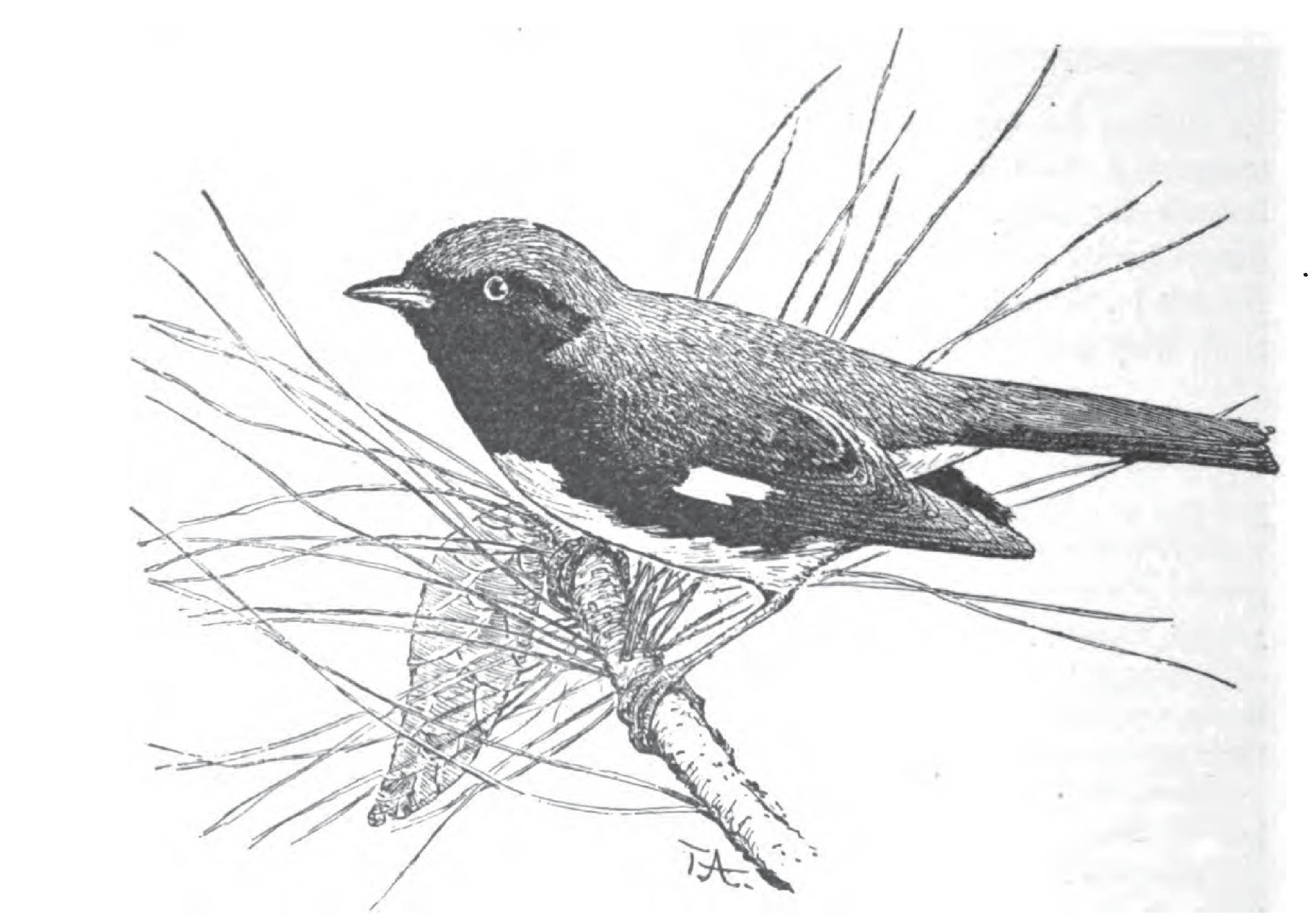
Illustration from Handbook of Birds of Eastern North America 1897

He graduated from art school at the age of eighteen and provided 110 illustrations for The Handbook of the Birds of Eastern North America. His interest in birds continued when he immigrated to Canada and a visitor remarked on his relationship with the birds around his bungalow in Upper Woodstock. He would whistle bird-calls and the birds would flutter around him and sometimes land on his head.

== Canoe-building ==
In 1887, Tappan and his sister visited Minnie's family at their home in Woodstock, New Brunswick. Adney intended to spend a month in Woodstock preparing for the entry examination for Columbia University. While in Woodstock, he met Peter Jo, a Wolastoqiyik (Maliseet) canoe-builder. He became interested in the language and culture and with Joseph's help, he built his first canoe, spending twenty months in Woodstock. In 1890, he wrote an article on canoe-building for a Harper's Young People supplement. He was credited with saving the art of birchbark canoe construction. He built more than 100 models of different types, which are now housed at the Mariners' Museum in Newport News, Virginia.

== Writer and illustrator ==
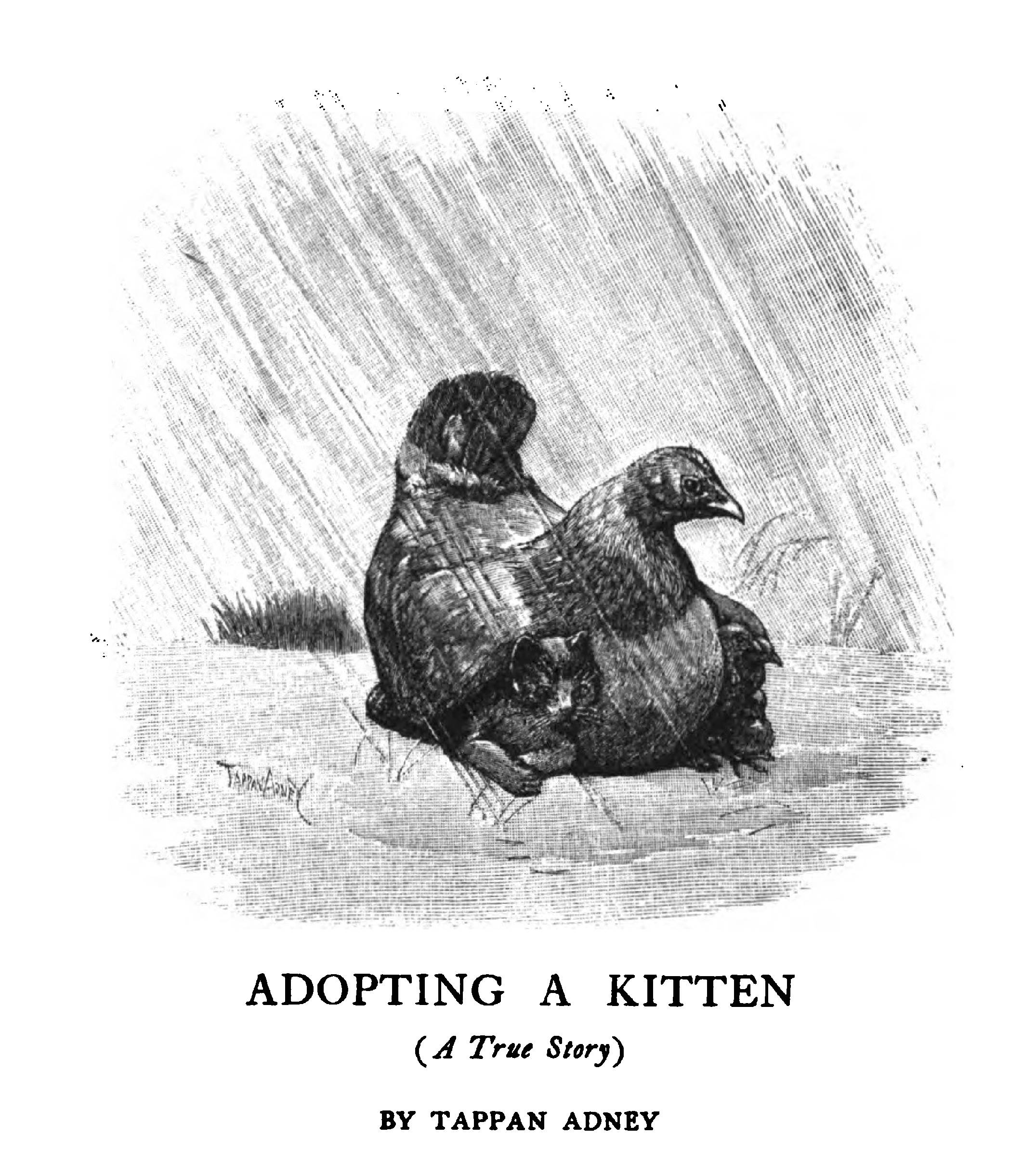
Illustration from "Adopting a Kitten"

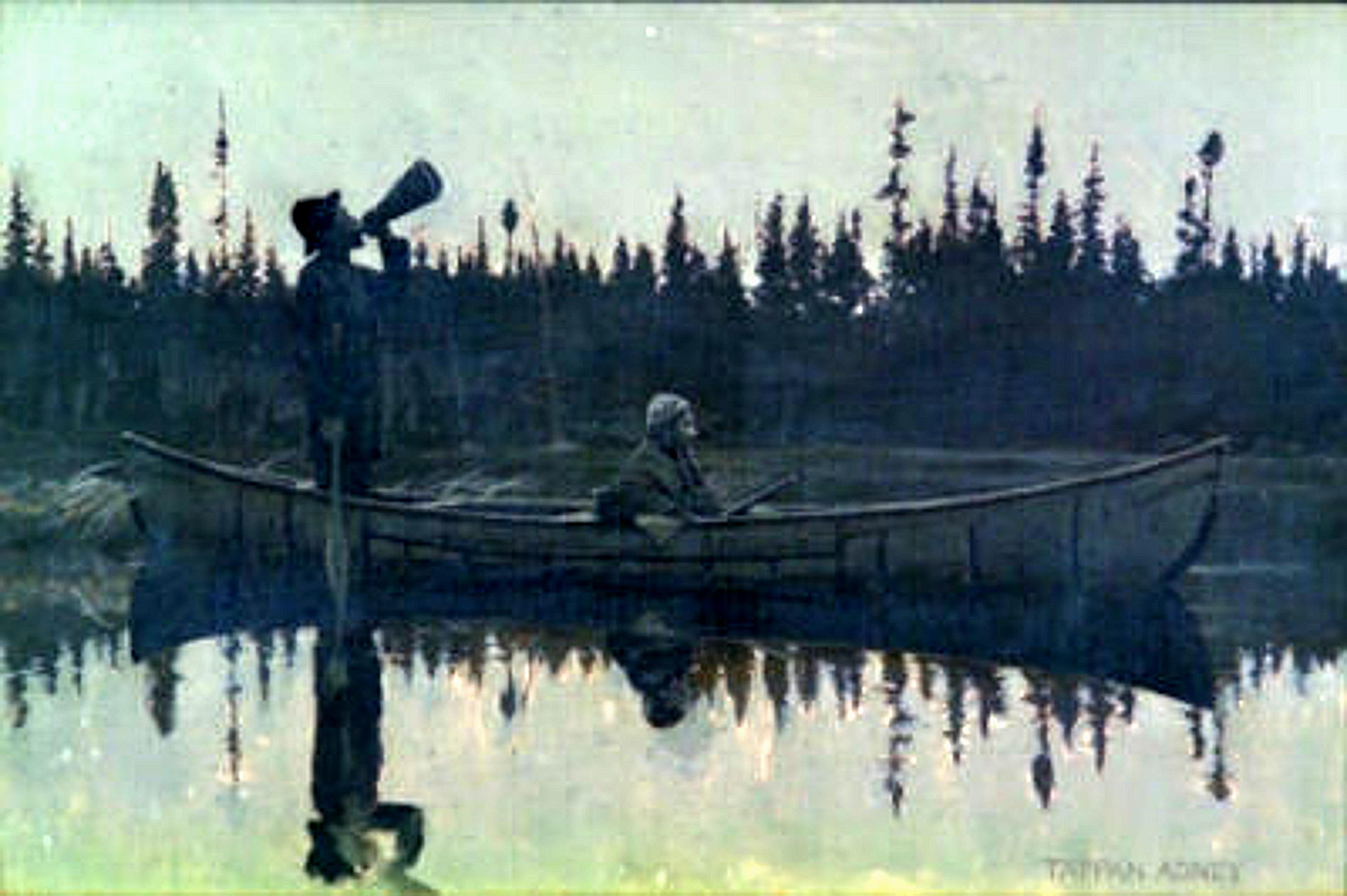
Illustration from "Their First Moose Hunt"

From 1890 onwards, Adney earned his reputation as a writer and illustrator for numerous magazine's including Harper's Weekly, Collier's Weekly, Harper's Young People, Saint Nicholas, Outing, and Our Animal Friends.

He authored the book, The Klondike Stampede about the Klondike Gold Rush. His photos of the Klondike Gold rush c. 1899 are available online via the McCord Museum.

He occasionally wrote poetry:

THE MOOSE CALL

Chippers to its dusky mate;
From out the misty hill
A night owl's lonesome cry is heard—
A cry that sends a chill
Of fear through beast and sleeping bird—
Then all again is still.

Hark! the hunter starts!
A sound borne softly on the air
The mighty stillness parts
And makes the hunter's heart beat fast.
Tender, low, it thrills
The listening hunter's inmost soul:
Yet resonant it fills
The valley with an echo from
The everlasting hills!
EDWIN TAPPAN ADNEY

== Klondike Gold Rush ==
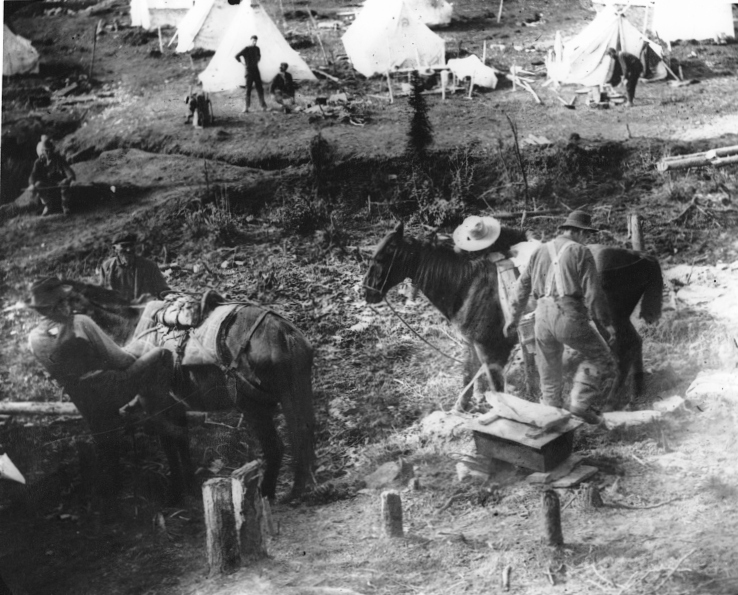
Loading gold on pack horses, Bonanza, YT, 1898 by Edwin Tappan Adney

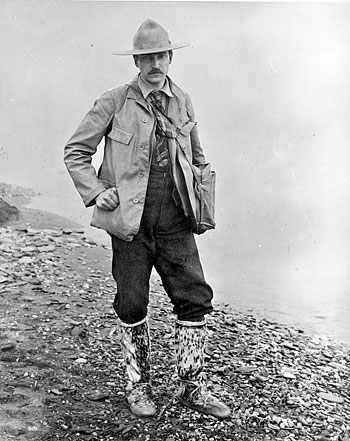
Adney in the Yukon 1897

He was one of the first photojournalists to pass safely through British Columbia. As a writer for Harper's Weekly, he was sent with his camera to the Yukon from 1897 to 1898. His classic illustrated book concerns his experiences in the Yukon, of which numerous editions have been printed. He returned there to briefly report on the Nome Gold Rush in 1900. He retired first to Montreal, then to New Brunswick, the place where his wife was born. He learned the Maliseet language of the native Canadians of New Brunswick.

== Marriage and family ==
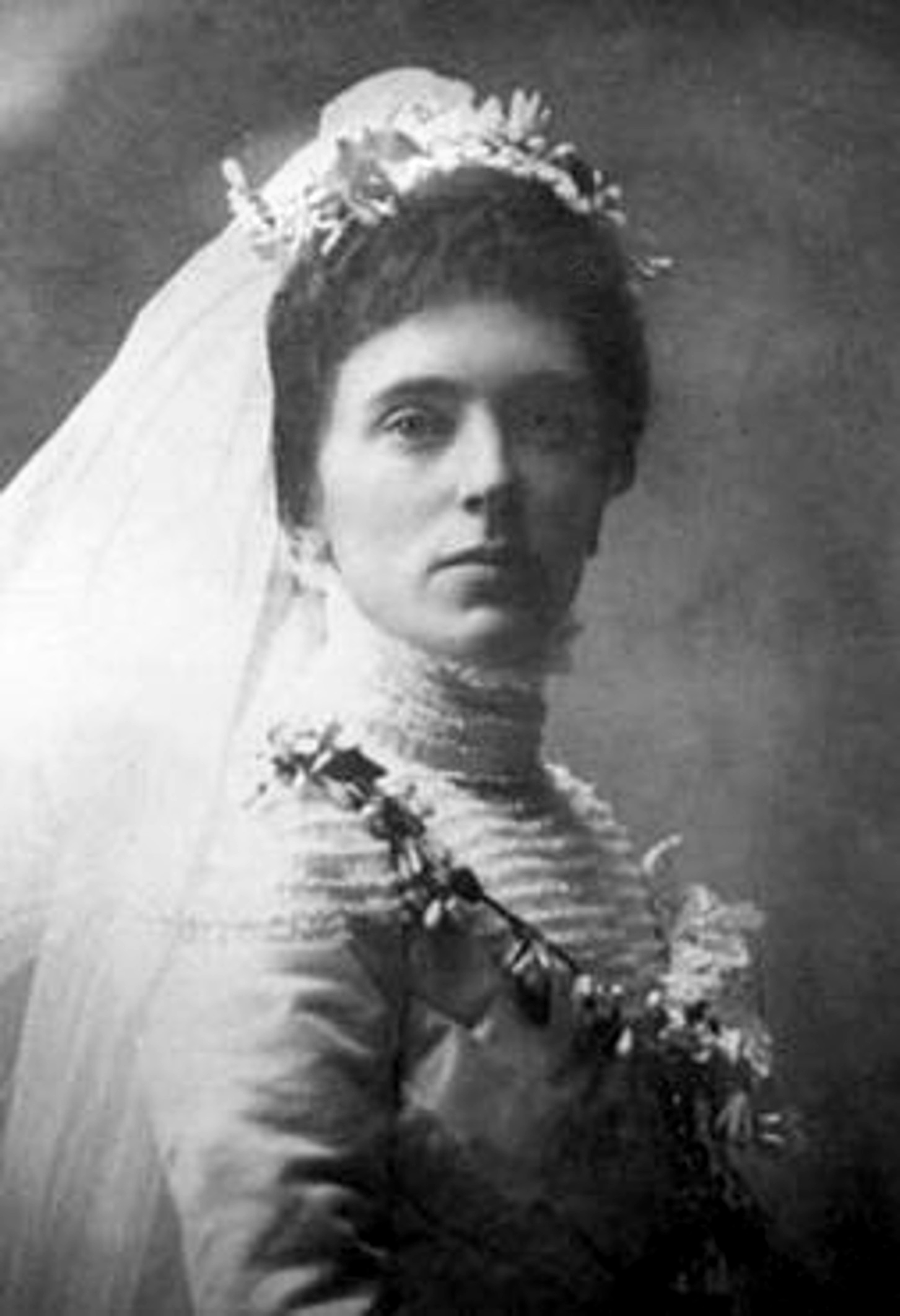
Minnie Bell Sharp Adney on her wedding day in 1899

Adney married Minnie Bell Sharp on September 12, 1899, at Saint Luke's Episcopal Church in Woodstock, New Brunswick. They had one child, Francis Glenn Adney, born in Woodstock in 1902. He graduated from McGill University in 1923 with a Bachelor of Science degree in Mathematics. He played the piano with dance bands in Montreal and the United States. He retired in 1966 from the Metropolitan Life Insurance Company in New York, where he had worked as an actuary, and died in 1983 in Ramsey, New Jersey.

== Canadian naturalization ==
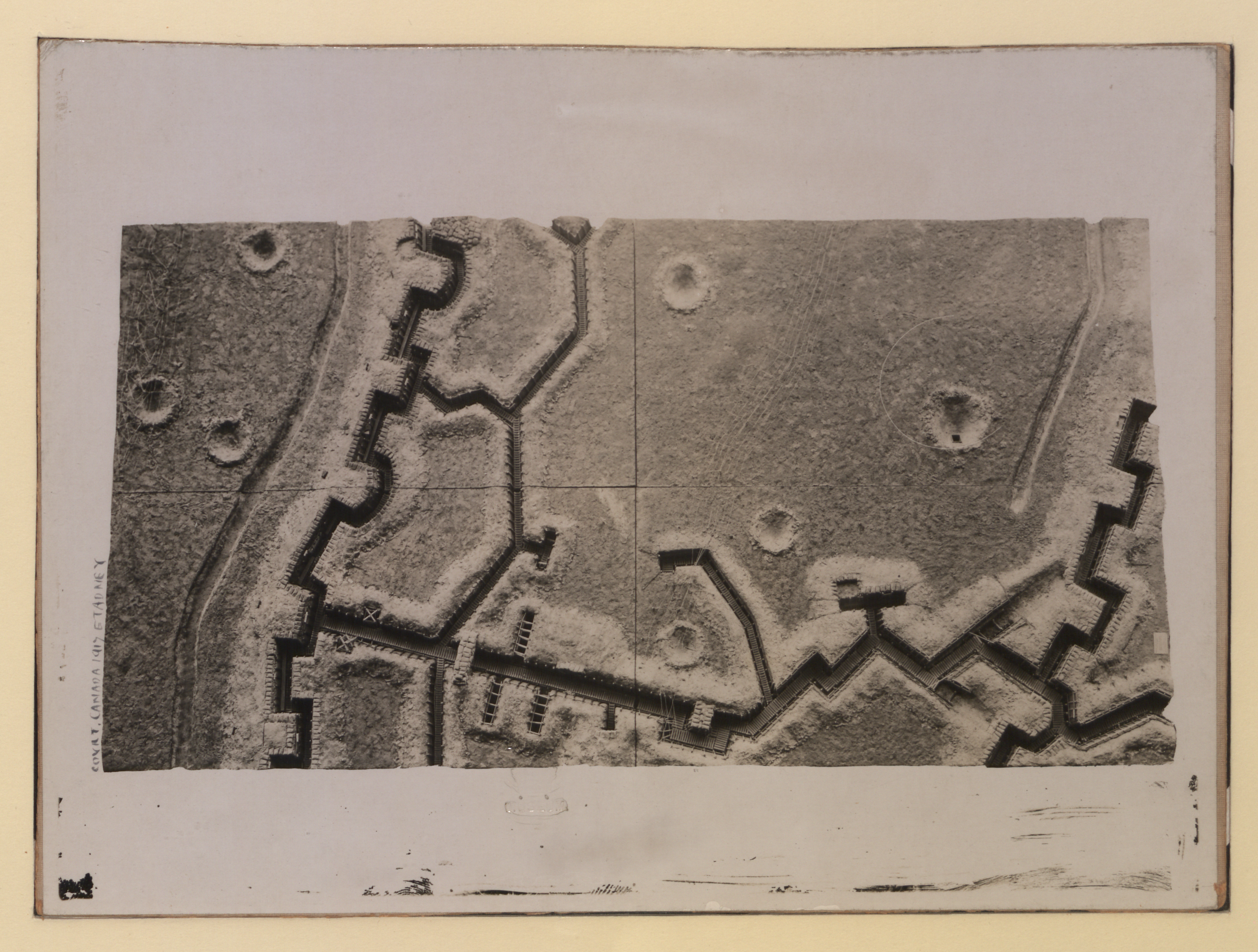
WWI scale model by Adney

In 1916, he joined the Royal Canadian Engineers. He became a British subject in 1917. During the First World War he was as an engineering officer at the Royal Military College of Canada in Kingston, Ontario (1916–19) constructing scale models of fortifications for training purposes. His duties were non-combative and he remained in Canada for the duration of the war.

After the war, he created a set of three-dimensional coats-of-arms of the Canadian provinces, then numbering nine, and one Territory that adorn Currie Hall at Royal Military College of Canada.

In Montreal, Quebec he created heraldic art, worked for the Museum of McGill University as a consultant on aboriginal lore, and consulted to McCord Museum on canoes 1920–33.

== Consultant on Wolastoqiyik (Maliseet) Culture ==
In 1946 Peter Lewis Paul, friend of Tappan Adney and member of the Wolastoqey First Nation, was convicted of the theft of ash saplings. Tappan Adney had previously advocated MP John MacNicol, who was resolved to push a re-examination of the Indian Act, that such activity by a First Nation member was a right guaranteed by treaty. This was the beginning of a long legal debate that was only resolved in 1999 when the Supreme Court of Canada accepted that the Maritime Aboriginals had ancient treaty rights that predated the formation of Canada.

Tappan Adney's close association with Peter Paul resulted in a linguistic study of the Wolastoqey language.

== Muralist ==
The lobby of the Hudson's Bay Company store on the corner of Portage Avenue and Memorial Boulevard in Winnipeg, Manitoba c. 1925 was decorated with two immense murals, 52′ long by 10′ wide, depicting scenes of the Company's early history by Edward Tappan Adney and Adam Sheriff Scott. Although the mural entitled Nonsuch at Fort Charles was removed in 1948 to allow the refurbishment of an escalator, The Pioneer at Fort Garry (1861) remained on display until 2014. Both murals have been donated to the Manitoba Museum. Fort Garry and Fort Charles were two important trading posts of the Hudson Bay Company. The Nonsuch was the first trading vessel that sailed into Hudson Bay in 1668–1669 and The Pioneer was the first steamboat on the Red River.

His photos of rural Ontario c. 1930 are available online via the McCord Museum. He then moved to Montreal, Quebec 1920–33 where he created heraldic art, worked for the Museum of McGill University as a consultant on aboriginal lore, and consulted to McCord Museum on canoes.

He is buried in the Upper Woodstock Cemetery, Woodstock, New Brunswick with his wife.

== Flag designer ==
Adney's winning entry in the 1926 La Presse flag design contest

Adney contributed to the effort to design a distinctive national flag for Canada. Their entry in the 1926 La Presse flag design contest was awarded First Prize, an honor they shared with three other entrants who had submitted similar designs. Journalist and heraldist Hugh Savage continued to publicly advocate for the flag throughout the 1945-46 Parliamentary flag committee debate. The design made it to the final rounds of Parliamentary committee deliberation, being the fifth-to-last to be eliminated from consideration out of almost 1500 entries.

== Bibliography ==
- Bark Canoes, The Art and Obsession of Tappan Adney Jennings, John. A Firefly Book, 2004. ISBN 1-55297-733-1
- The Klondike Stampede, by Tappan Adney, Special Correspondent of Harper's Weekly in the Klondike (New York: Harpers, 1900).
- The Sharp Family, 1908
- The Bark Canoes and Skin Boats of North America, Edwin Adney Tappan and Howard I. Chapelle, Smithsoman Institution, Washington D.C, 1964
