= Woodstock, New Brunswick =

Town on the Saint John River, western New Brunswick, Canada

Woodstock
- Town
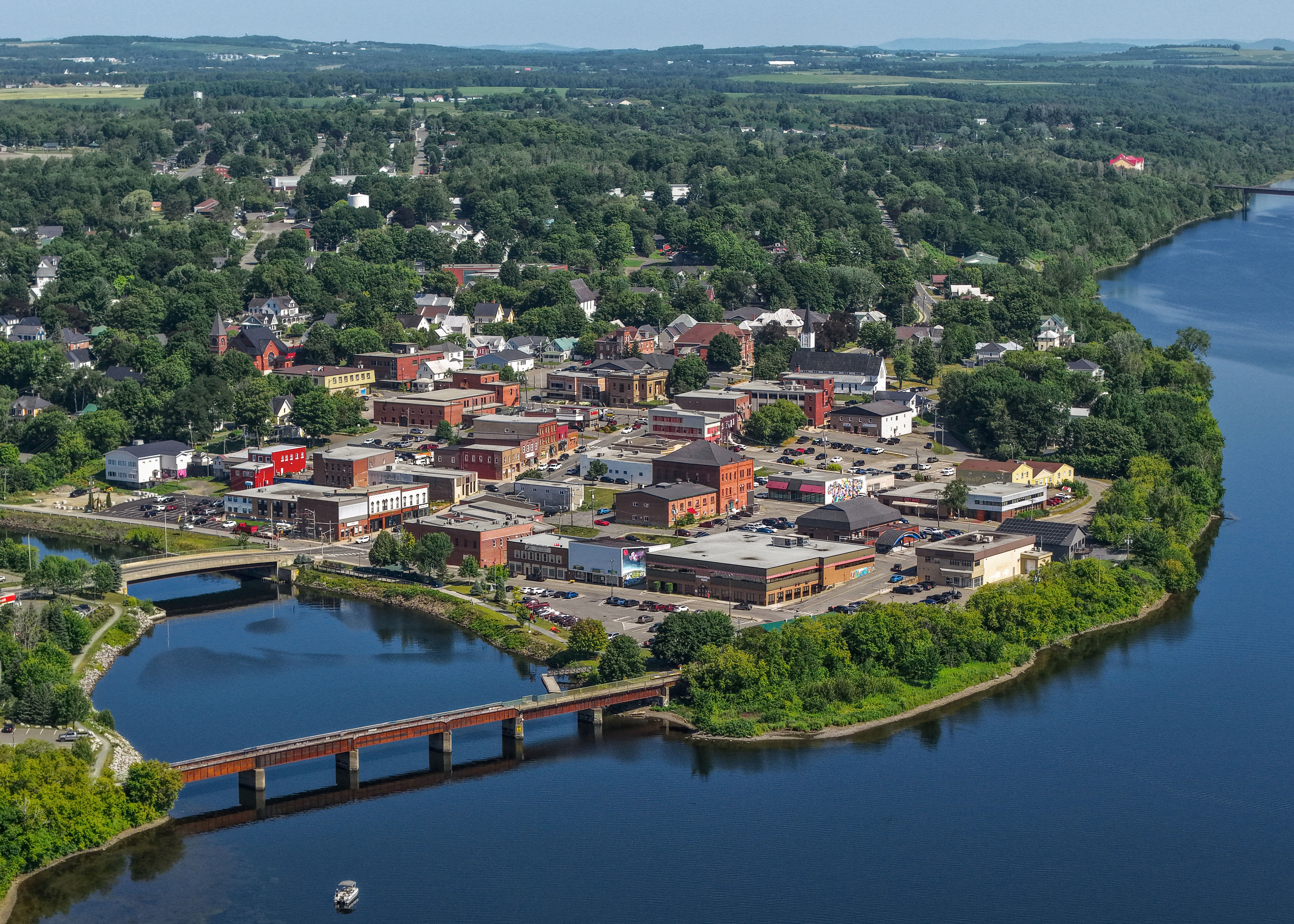
- Downtown Woodstock in 2026

- Wordmark
- Nickname: The Shiretown
- Motto: New Brunswick's First Town
- Location of Woodstock in New Brunswick
- Coordinates: 46.16176°N 67.58647°W
- Country: Canada
- Province: New Brunswick
- County: Carleton County
- Parish: Woodstock Parish
- Incorporated: May 1, 1856

Government
  - Type: Mayor-council government
  - Mayor: Jeff Wright
  - Councillors: Art Slipp, Mark Rogers, Laura Gaddas, John Dolimount, Keith Bull, Scott Dunlop, May Atkinson and Will Belyea

Area
  - Land: 14.96 km^{2} (5.78 sq mi)
- Elevation: 36 to 85 m (118 to 279 ft)

Population (2021)
  - Total: 5,553
  - Density: 371.1/km^{2} (961/sq mi)
  - Change (2016–21): ▲6.2%
- Time zone: UTC-4 (AST)
  - Summer (DST): UTC-3 (ADT)
- Canadian Postal code: E7M
- Area code: 506
- Telephone Exchange(s): 328, 325, 324, 612, 594
- NTS Map: 21J4 Woodstock
- GNBC Code: DAWNW
- Website: town.woodstock.nb.ca

Woodstock is a town in Carleton County, New Brunswick, Canada on the Saint John River, 103 km (64 mi) upriver from Fredericton at the mouth of the Meduxnekeag River. It is near the Canada–United States border and Houlton, Maine and the intersection of Interstate 95 and the Trans-Canada Highway making it a transportation hub. It is also a service centre for the potato industry and for more than 26,000 people in the nearby communities of Hartland, Florenceville-Bristol, Centreville, Bath and Lakeland Ridges for shopping, employment and entertainment.

Woodstock was possibly named after Woodstock, Oxfordshire. The name is Old English in origin, meaning a "clearing in the woods". New Brunswick historian William Francis Ganong believed the parish (and later town) was named in honour of Viscount Woodstock, a junior title of the Duke of Portland, Prime Minister of Great Britain when the Loyalists arrived in New Brunswick.

On 1 January 2023, Woodstock expanded in all directions, annexing all or part of six local service districts. Revised census figures have not been released.

== History ==
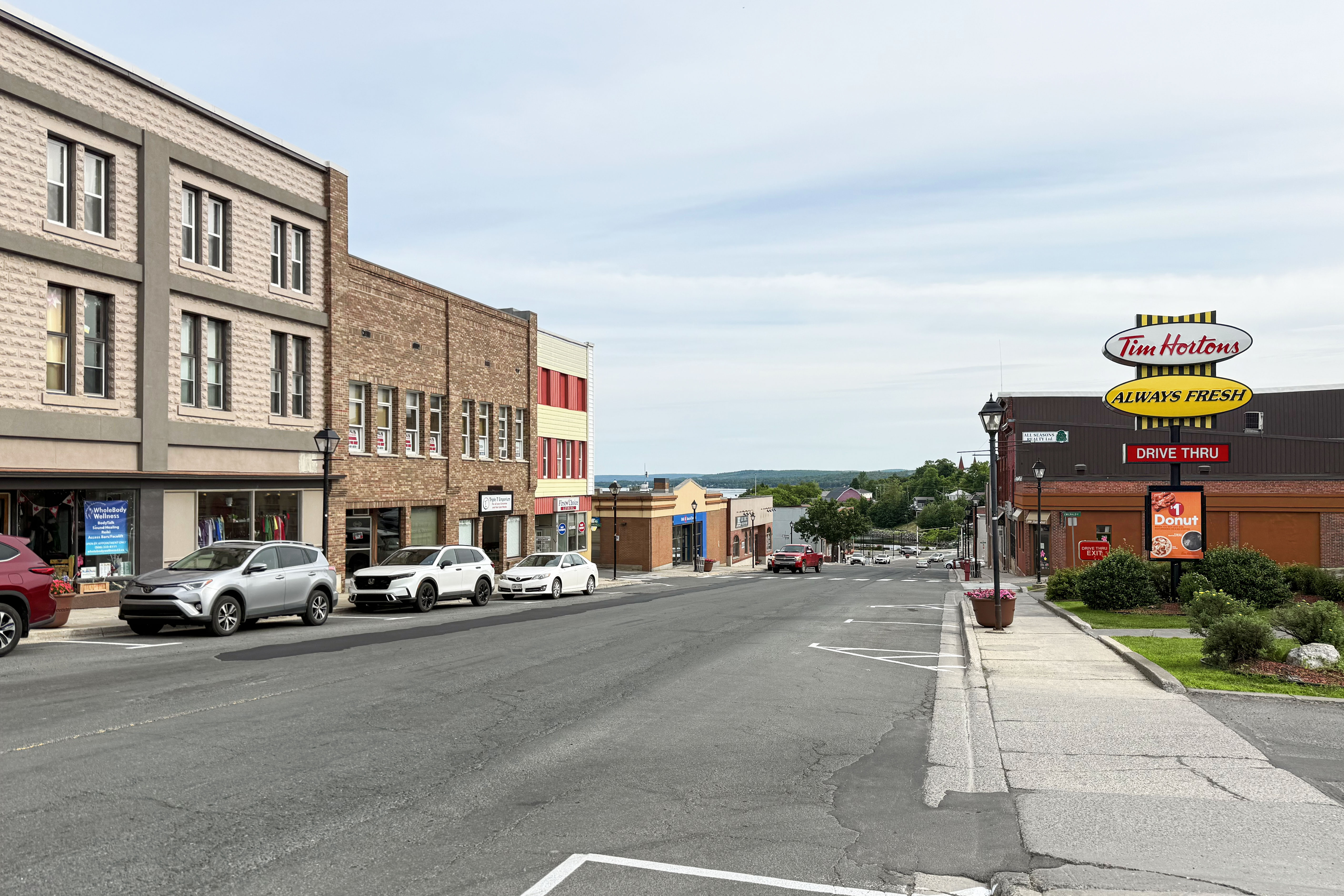
Looking south along Main Street

Little is known of the area before it was settled by disbanded veterans of De Lancey's Brigade following the American Revolutionary War. The veterans moved there in late 1783. The 26,000 acres grant was to 110 men. Not all took up the offer, and of those who did, not all stayed. By 1790 only 23 families were present, and by 1804 only 10 of the original men had possession of the land. According to the diaries of Frederick Dibblee mills were present from 1805. Export of timber via the Saint John river began about this time.

When Carleton County was created in 1831, Woodstock was made county seat, and a jail, court house and registry office were installed. From 1837 William Teel Baird operated a pharmacy. The first steamboat from Fredericton reached Woodstock in 1837 and a regular service was established in 1845. By 1847 the population was at 2,000 and the town had four churches, a bank, and a grammar school.

On The Twelfth (Orangemen's Day) of July 1847 a riot took place at the corner of Victoria and Boyne streets near the site of the Orange Hall, built in 1848 and now a vacant lot. It was a conflict between Protestant Irish immigrants of the Orange Order and Catholic Irish immigrants. Around 250 Orangemen clashed with an equal number of Irish Catholics, leading to 10 deaths and many more injuries. It was a result of years of tensions. Subsequently, only Catholics were brought to trial.

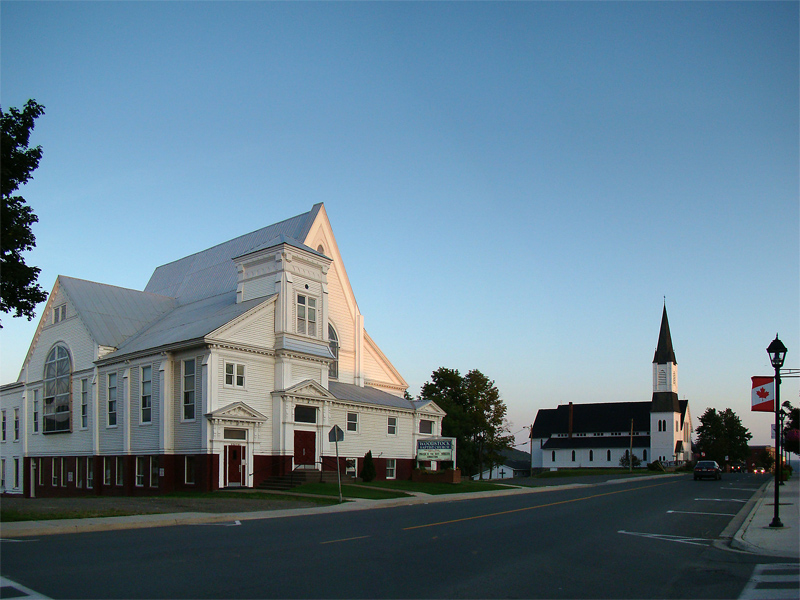
Sunset on Main Street

According to the 1851, census there were 488 inhabited houses, and nine places of worship. Immigration was important, with the majority coming from Ireland.

The town was the first in New Brunswick to be incorporated, in 1856. The first mayor was Lewis P. Fisher. He made provisions in his will for the building of several educational institutions, among them the first Agricultural and Vocational School in Canada, and the L. P. Fisher Public Library. In 1861, the newly built railway between Saint Andrews and Woodstock was seized by several hundred navvies, angry at not being paid. A peaceful settlement was later made personally by Arthur Hamilton-Gordon.

The first telephone was installed in 1885 by H.V. Dalling, a homemade telephone whose wires ran between his home and shop. The Bell Telephone Company later opened a small telephone exchange in his store.

In 1887, Tappan Adney, visiting Woodstock, learnt birchbark canoe construction from a Maliseet, preserving and document the building process.

The headquarters for the New Brunswick Railway were here from 1870 until it ceased functioning.

The first dam at the mouth of the Meduxnekeag River was built in 1886. In the 1880s Woodstock had two small electric companies related to the Small & Fisher and Connell Brothers iron foundries. These were superseded by the Woodstock Electric Railway Light and Power Company which in 1906 built a dam and a powerhouse on the Meduxnekeag for distribution of power to the town. The first hydro-electric station in New Brunswick, the Hayden dam and its power station was destroyed by a freshet in 1923, which also washed out the bridge that crossed the Meduxnekeag.

== Culture & recreation ==
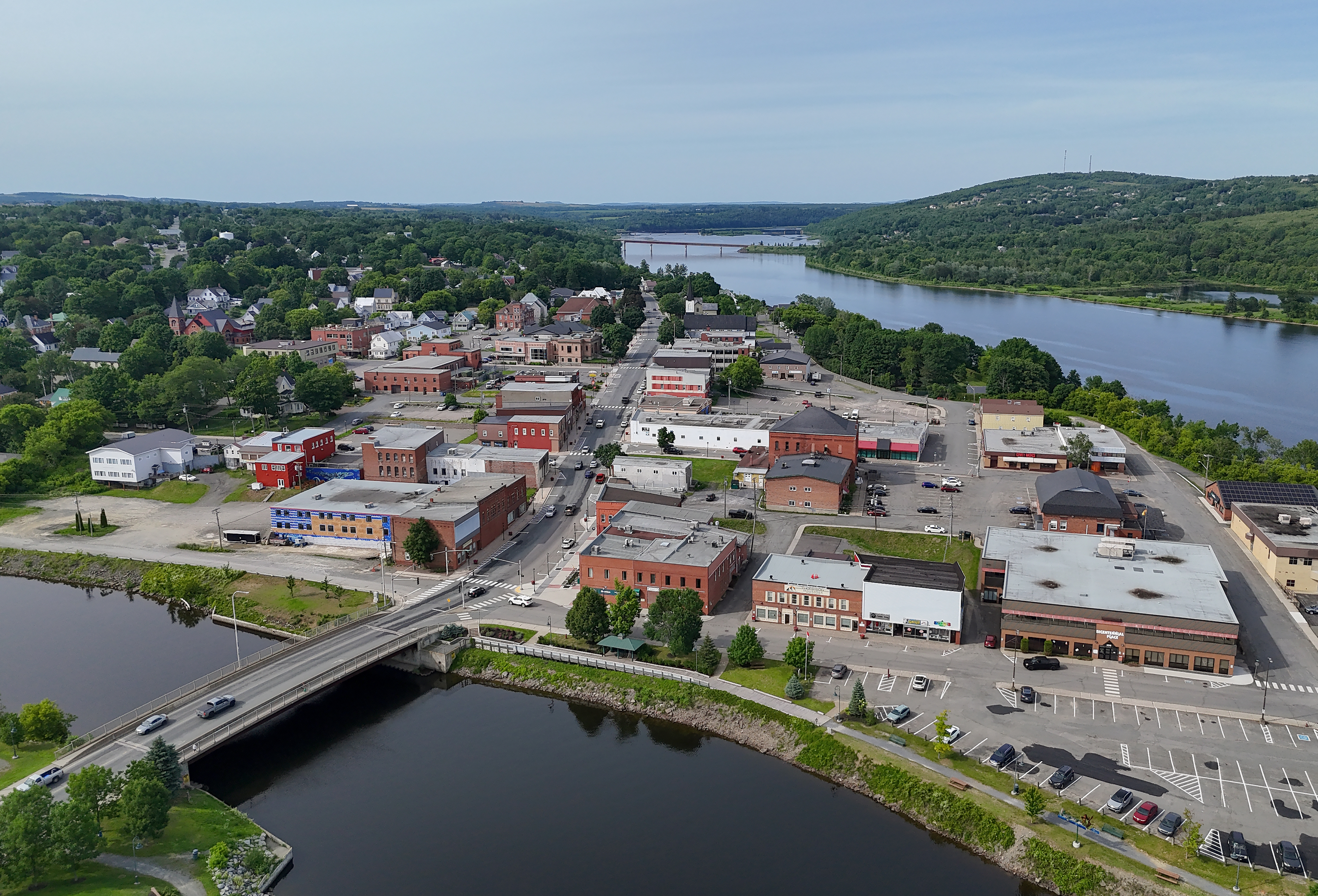
Aerial view (2025)

In 1995, the Town of Woodstock opened the Carleton Civic Centre. The multipurpose complex houses a 25-metre (27-yard) indoor swimming pool, an 846-seat arena, a fitness centre, and community meeting rooms. The Woodstock Slammers of the Maritime Junior Hockey League played previously at the Ayr Motor Centre.

The annual Woodstock Old Home Week activities are centered around Woodstock and the fair grounds at Connell Park. Activities include parades and fireworks, a gospel concert, 4-H activities, Miss New Brunswick talent show & pageant, beautiful baby contest, horse pulling, harness racing, and a demolition derby.

The Dooryard Arts Festival is four days of music, art, theatre, stories, workshops and an open-air market.

== Economy & infrastructure ==
=== Education ===
A campus of the New Brunswick Community College, Townsview School (Grades K-8), Meduxnekeag Consolidated School (Grades K-8), and Woodstock High School.

=== Transportation ===
Woodstock is located on New Brunswick Route 2, an alignment of the Trans-Canada Highway. The shorter New Brunswick Route 95 extends westward from Woodstock to the Houlton/Woodstock Border Crossing, where it continues into the United States as Interstate 95. The small public Woodstock Airport is in nearby Grafton, New Brunswick.

=== Mining ===
Regional geology consists of shales over a Late Ordovician to Early Silurian formation.

Iron-manganese and iron ore occurrences were reported in 1836 during a geological survey conducted by the state of Maine. The Woodstock Iron Works ran from 1848 to 1884, closing because of competition from the United States.

Today Minco owns 100% of an 880 hectares (3 1/2 mi^{2}) manganese claim, about 6.3 km (3.9 mi) northwest of Woodstock. Samples were taken in 2010, 2011, and 2013. Minco plans to produce manganese well below the typical cost for the industry. The manganese would be used in the production of stainless steel.

=== Media ===
Woodstock's radio station is CJCJ-FM. The weekly newspapers are the Bugle-Observer and the River Valley Sun.

=== Architecture ===
Many of the original wooden buildings have not survived into modern times. Calamities over the years included a hurricane in 1836, and fires in 1860, and 1911, As a result, much of downtown was rebuilt in the brick that remains today. Before the arrival of the railway, businesses faced the river banks, since they provided transportation, energy, and water. With the switch to rail and road traffic buildings face roads instead.

The George Frederick Clarke house, built in 1905, is a provincial historic site valued as a rare example of residential Regency architecture.

The Old Carleton County Court House was built in 1833. When new court house was constructed, the old one was used as a horse barn from 1911 to 1960 when it was purchased by the Carleton County Historical Society. It was the site of the George Gee trial, and that of Minnie Bell Sharp who ran the Woodstock School of Music in the early 1900s.

== Demographics ==
In the 2021 Census of Population conducted by Statistics Canada, Woodstock had a population of 5,553 living in 2,486 of its 2,622 total private dwellings, a change of 6.2% from its 2016 population of 5,228. With a land area of 14.96 km^{2} (5.78 sq mi), it had a population density of 371.2/km^{2} (961.4/sq mi) in 2021.

The Maliseet Woodstock First Nation is about 9 km (5.6 mi) south of the town on 426 acres with an on-reserve population of 291 and an off-reserve population of 721.

Historical population
| Year | Pop. | ±% p.a. |
|---|---|---|
| 1847 | 600 | — |
| 1857 | 1,581 | +10.17% |
| 1867 | 4,300 | +10.52% |
| 1881 | 3,000 | −2.54% |
| 1891 | 3,290 | +0.93% |
| 1901 | 3,644 | +1.03% |
| 1911 | 3,856 | +0.57% |
| 1921 | 3,380 | −1.31% |
| 1931 | 3,259 | −0.36% |
| 1941 | 3,593 | +0.98% |
| 1951 | 3,996 | +1.07% |
| 1961 | 4,305 | +0.75% |
| 1971 | 4,846 | +1.19% |
| 1981 | 4,649 | −0.41% |
| 1986 | 4,549 | −0.43% |
| 1991 | 4,782 | +1.00% |
| 1996 | 5,092 | +1.26% |
| 1999 | 4,631 | −3.11% |
| 2001 | 5,231 | +6.28% |
| 2004 | 5,100 | −0.84% |
| 2006 | 5,113 | +0.13% |
| 2011 | 5,254 | +0.55% |
| 2016 | 5,228 | −0.10% |
| 2021 | 5,553 | +1.21% |

== Geography & climate ==
Woodstock experiences a humid continental climate (Dfb). The highest temperature ever recorded in Woodstock was 39.4 °C (103 °F) on 18 August 1935. Woodstock, along with Five Rivers and Nepisiguit Falls share the record for New Brunswick's highest recorded temperature.

Climate data for Woodstock, 1981–2010 normals, extremes 1886–present
| Month | Jan | Feb | Mar | Apr | May | Jun | Jul | Aug | Sep | Oct | Nov | Dec | Year |
|---|---|---|---|---|---|---|---|---|---|---|---|---|---|
| Record high °C (°F) | 13.5 (56.3) | 16.5 (61.7) | 26.0 (78.8) | 31.5 (88.7) | 35.6 (96.1) | 35.6 (96.1) | 36.7 (98.1) | 39.4 (102.9) | 34.4 (93.9) | 30.0 (86.0) | 22.8 (73.0) | 16.1 (61.0) | 39.4 (102.9) |
| Mean daily maximum °C (°F) | −6.0 (21.2) | −3.3 (26.1) | 2.2 (36.0) | 9.4 (48.9) | 17.6 (63.7) | 22.9 (73.2) | 25.3 (77.5) | 24.7 (76.5) | 19.4 (66.9) | 12.0 (53.6) | 4.4 (39.9) | −2.3 (27.9) | 10.5 (50.9) |
| Daily mean °C (°F) | −11.5 (11.3) | −9.5 (14.9) | −3.4 (25.9) | 3.7 (38.7) | 10.9 (51.6) | 16.3 (61.3) | 19.0 (66.2) | 18.4 (65.1) | 13.2 (55.8) | 6.6 (43.9) | 0.3 (32.5) | −7.0 (19.4) | 4.8 (40.6) |
| Mean daily minimum °C (°F) | −17.0 (1.4) | −15.6 (3.9) | −8.9 (16.0) | −2.0 (28.4) | 4.1 (39.4) | 9.6 (49.3) | 12.6 (54.7) | 12.0 (53.6) | 6.9 (44.4) | 1.1 (34.0) | −3.9 (25.0) | −11.7 (10.9) | −1.1 (30.0) |
| Record low °C (°F) | −43.5 (−46.3) | −43.9 (−47.0) | −37.2 (−35.0) | −23.3 (−9.9) | −9.4 (15.1) | −6.7 (19.9) | −1.1 (30.0) | −1.0 (30.2) | −6.7 (19.9) | −13.3 (8.1) | −25.0 (−13.0) | −40.6 (−41.1) | −43.9 (−47.0) |
| Average precipitation mm (inches) | 104.0 (4.09) | 71.6 (2.82) | 91.2 (3.59) | 80.4 (3.17) | 94.2 (3.71) | 91.0 (3.58) | 100.2 (3.94) | 100.6 (3.96) | 95.7 (3.77) | 95.3 (3.75) | 103.2 (4.06) | 103.2 (4.06) | 1,130.6 (44.51) |
| Average rainfall mm (inches) | 27.5 (1.08) | 24.2 (0.95) | 36.9 (1.45) | 61.6 (2.43) | 93.6 (3.69) | 91.0 (3.58) | 100.2 (3.94) | 100.6 (3.96) | 95.6 (3.76) | 92.1 (3.63) | 81.9 (3.22) | 53.2 (2.09) | 858.2 (33.79) |
| Average snowfall cm (inches) | 76.6 (30.2) | 47.4 (18.7) | 54.3 (21.4) | 18.8 (7.4) | 0.7 (0.3) | 0.0 (0.0) | 0.0 (0.0) | 0.0 (0.0) | 0.1 (0.0) | 3.2 (1.3) | 21.3 (8.4) | 50.0 (19.7) | 272.3 (107.2) |
Source: Environment Canada

== Government ==
Woodstock elects a mayor and a town council every four years. All councilors are elected at-large. The last election was in May 2026.

The chief administrative officer and the administration department is responsible for the town financial matters, record keeping, implementation of policies and directives, and providing support to all other departments and the town council. The position of chief administrative officer was formerly known as town manager. Woodstock was the first town in New Brunswick to have a manager-council form of government.

The current mayor of Woodstock is Jeff Wright who had previously held the position between 2004-2008, and has resumed the position since 2026.

Town Managers/Chief Administrative Officers
| # | Manager/CAO | Term |
|---|---|---|
| 1st | R. Fraser Armstrong | 1919–1923 |
| 2nd | Michael J. Rutledge | 1923–1927 |
| 3rd | Blake Allen | 1927–1929 |
| 4th | Gordon MacPhail | 1929–1931 |
| 5th | A. Gordon Bailey | 1931–1941 |
| 6th | George B. Kilpatrick | 1941–1944 |
| 7th | Carl W. Groman | 1944–1946 |
| 8th | Douglas MacBride | 1946–1947 |
| 9th | Avard J. Bird | 1947–1947 |
| 10th | Oliver H. Manuel | 1947–1949 |
| 11th | Wesley H. Steeves | 1949–1952 |
| 12th | James R. Calkin | 1952–1959 |
| 13th | George B. Kilpatrick | 1959–1966 |
| 14th | Thomas L. Everett | 1967–1983 |
| 15th | Edward L. Dickinson | 1983–1996 |
| 16th | Kenneth C. Harding | 1996–2017 |
| 17th | John Pinsent | 2017–2019 |
| Acting | Andrew Garnett | 2019 |
| 18th | Ken Anthony | 2019–2022 |
| Acting | Andrew Garnett | 2022 |
| 19th | Andrew Garnett | 2022–2023 |
| 20th | Allan Walker | 2023-present |

The Woodstock's other town departments are Business Development, Development & Inspectional Services, Fire, Police, Public Works, Recreation, and Tourism.

== Notable people ==
- Tappan Adney (1868–1950), artist, writer and photographer
- Myles Goodwyn (1948–2023), musician and lead vocalist, guitarist, and principal songwriter of the rock band April Wine
- Lindsay Merrithew (born 1964), entrepreneur, actor, and business executive
