= List of people from Carleton County, New Brunswick =

This is a list of notable people from Carleton County, New Brunswick. Although not everyone in this list was born in Carleton County, they all live or have lived in Carleton County and have had significant connections to the communities.

This article does include People from Woodstock for now as they do not have their own section.

Full name	Community	Famous for	Birth	Death	Other
Earle Avery	Woodstock	harness racing	1894	1977	Canada & U.S. Hall of Fame
Robert Begg	Florenceville	researcher	1914	1982	
Dianne Brushett	Bath	researcher	1942		
Fred Cogswell	East Centreville	poet	1917	2004	
Charles Connell	Northampton	politics	1810	1873	
Frank Copp	Bristol	judge	1881	1959	
Horace Victor Dalling	Richmond	inventor	1854	1931	
Aida McAnn Flemming	Victoria Corner	premier's wife	1896	1944	wife of Hugh John Flemming
Hugh John Flemming	Peel	premier of New Brunswick	1899	1982	
Myles Goodwyn	Woodstock	musician	1948		frontman of April Wine
Richard Hatfield	Hartland	premier of New Brunswick	1931	1991	Canadian senator
Harrison McCain	Florenceville	entrepreneur	1927	2004	
Wallace McCain	Florenceville	entrepreneur	1930	2011	
Andy Tommy	Hartland/Woodstock	Pro Football player	1911	1972	
Katherine Ryan	Johnville	Frontierswoman and restaurateur	1869	1932	

== See also ==
- List of people from New Brunswick
