= Wakefield, New Brunswick =

Coordinates: 46.221944°N 67.524152°W

Location of Wakefield in New Brunswick

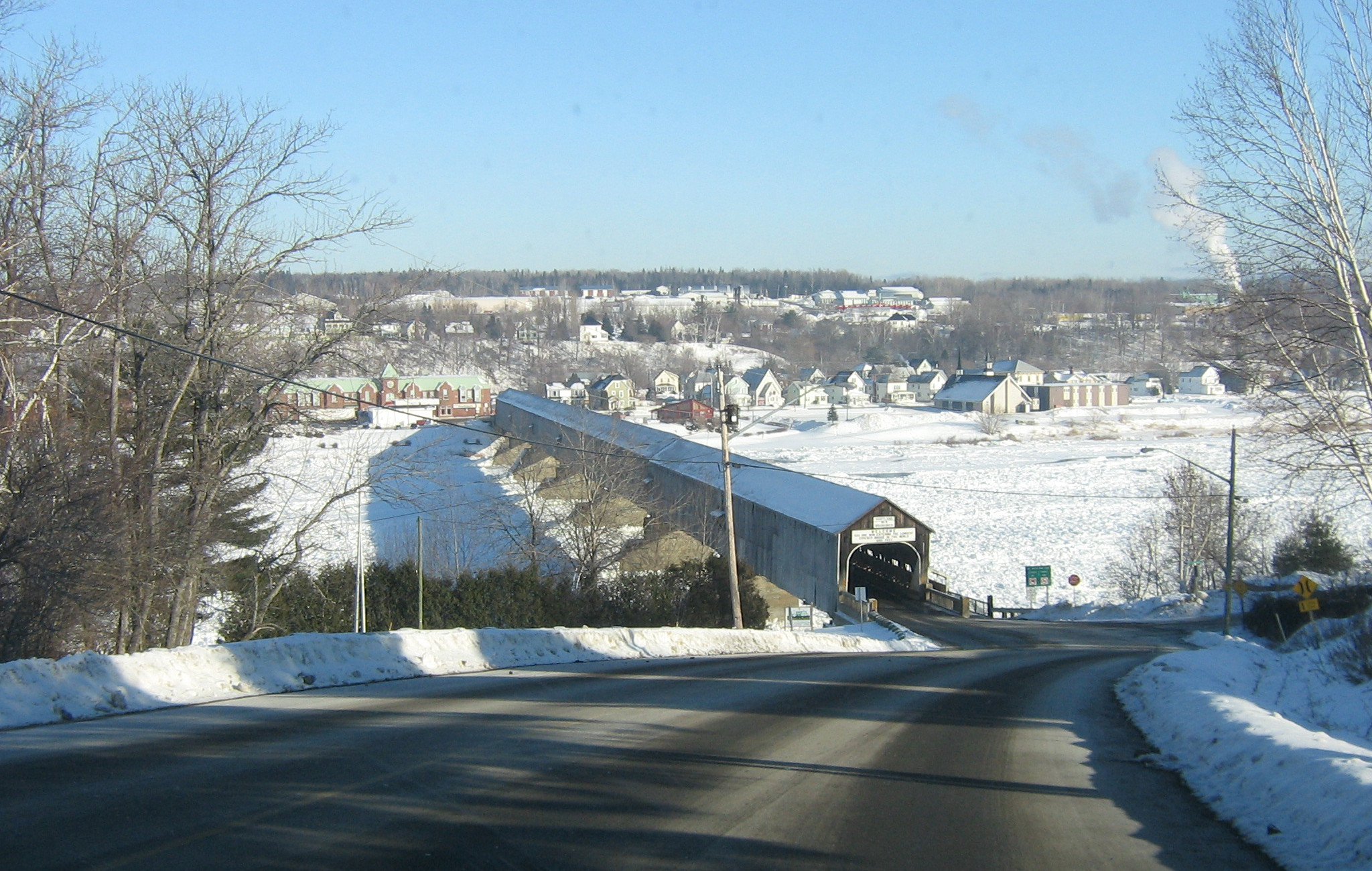
Hartland Covered Bridge

Wakefield is a dispersed Canadian rural community located in Wakefield Parish, Carleton County, New Brunswick.

Located approximately 9 km southeast of Hartland, Wakefield sits along Route 103 by the Saint John River. The nearby Hartland is home to the Hartland Bridge, the world's longest covered bridge.

== History ==
According to local residents in the early 20th century, the old village of Wakefield was located at what later became Victoria Corner. It had a large store run by James R. Tupper and a hotel run by John Moran.

In 1984, a famous bridge at Wakefield burned down in a fire. By 1988, it had been rebuilt as a covered bridge, and re-opened to pedestrians only.

== In popular culture ==
Wakefield is one of the settings in the novel Maclean by Allan Donaldson, which tells the story of a First World War veteran who was gassed at Ypres.

== See also ==
- List of historic places in Carleton County, New Brunswick
- List of communities in New Brunswick
- List of people from Carleton County, New Brunswick

== Neighbouring communities ==
- Hartland
