= Aida McAnn Flemming =

Canadian teacher, writer and advocate (1896–1994)

- Born: Ada Maud Boyer McAnn; March 7, 1896; Victoria Corner, New Brunswick
- Died: January 25, 1994 (aged 97)
- Education: Mount Allison University Columbia University
- Known for: founder of the Kindness Club
- Spouse: Hugh John Flemming (m. 1946)

Aida Maud Boyer McAnn Flemming, CM (7 March 1896 – 25 January 1994) was a Canadian teacher, writer and animal welfare advocate. She founded the Kindness Club, a humane education organization for children between the ages of 5 and 13. She was the wife of Hugh John Flemming, who was Premier of New Brunswick from 8 October 1952 to 11 July 1960.

== Family and early life ==
Her father was Charles Whitfield McAnn. Originally from Kent County, New Brunswick, he earned a Bachelor of Arts degree from Mount Allison University in Sackville, New Brunswick and a Bachelor of Laws from the University of Michigan. After practising law in Moncton, New Brunswick, he moved to Kaslo, British Columbia, with his wife, the former Ada Boyer. She died three months after their daughter Aida was born at the Boyer family home in Victoria Corner, New Brunswick, on 7 March 1896. Aida was her parents' only child. She was named Ada but later changed the spelling of her name to that of the Verdi opera Aida.

Aida McAnn lived with her father, his second wife and their two children in Kaslo. Charles Whitfield McAnn was a successful lawyer who became a Queen's Counsel and was the mayor of Kaslo when he died in 1907 at the age of 42. Aida was then 11 years old. She returned to New Brunswick to live with her uncle L. Wesley McAnn, who later became the mayor of Moncton. In 1910 she entered Netherwood School in Rothesay, New Brunswick, where she excelled academically.

== Education ==
She graduated from Mount Allison University with a BA in English at the age of 20 and earned a Certificate in Education at the University of Toronto in 1917. She later attended Columbia University in New York, where she earned a Master of Arts in English in 1930.

== Career ==
Aida McAnn began her working life as a teacher, first at Mount Allison University, where she taught English and History, and later at Dongan Hall, a private secondary school in New York City where she taught English, Latin, History and Current Events in 1930 and 1931. She worked as a freelance writer of advertising copy in New York before returning to New Brunswick where she worked as a writer for the department of Tourism for nine years. In 1938 she published a cookbook entitled The New Brunswick Cookbook. She also directed "The Cooking School of the Air", a program on CHSJ radio in Saint John, New Brunswick. She began working as a reporter for the Legislative Assembly of New Brunswick's official records of debate in 1944.

== Marriage ==
On 20 August 1946, she married Hugh John Flemming, a businessman from Juniper, New Brunswick, who had been elected to the New Brunswick Legislative Assembly in 1944. This was her third marriage, as two previous marriages had ended in divorce. Hugh John Flemming was Premier of New Brunswick from 1952 to 1960 and then served as a member of the Parliament of Canada from 1960 to 1972.

Aida Flemming was active in the community affairs of Juniper, where she lived after her marriage. She organized a local branch of the Canadian Red Cross Society in order to secure the services of a visiting nurse for the isolated community, and established a public library in the school.

When her husband became premier in 1952 she moved with him to Fredericton, where she continued to promote reading and libraries. She was the patron of Young Canada Book Week in 1953 and helped to establish the Fredericton Public Library, which opened in 1955. She served on the library's board of directors from 1955 to 1958. Lord Beaverbrook appointed her to the board of governors of the Beaverbrook Art Gallery when it opened in 1959. She was also active on the boards of directors of the Fredericton SPCA and the Fredericton Children's Aid Society.

== Kindness Club ==
She founded the Kindness Club, a club to teach children between the ages of 5 and 13 to love and be kind to animals, in 1959. The organization grew rapidly, reaching 2000 members in over 100 chapters in North America and England by 1961. She remained closely involved with the Kindness Club, whose headquarters were at her home in Fredericton. By the late 1960s she regularly received up to 50 letters a day from club members, which she answered on her own until the organization hired a secretary to help with the correspondence in 1973.

== Honors and recognition ==
Aida Flemming was named Humanitarian of the Year by the Humane Society of the United States in 1964.

She was awarded an Honorary Doctor of law degree by Mount Allison University in 1958. In 1962 she was named "Atlantic Woman of the Year" and in 1976 she was given the Fredericton Chamber of Commerce's Distinguished Citizen Award.

She was made a member of the Order of Canada in 1978 for "her many services to the community of Fredericton and the founding of the Kindness Club, an organization dedicated to the protection of animals, which now has branches in twenty-two countries".

Alden Nowlan's "A poem for Aida Flemming", which was published in 1982, begins:

May God have mercy
on the porcupine
broken free
but with the snare
still around his neck
the end of it still trailing
behind him
and bound to catch
on something.

== Later years and legacy ==
Hugh John Flemming died on 16 October 1982. Aida Flemming died on 25 January 1994. In the 1960s she had purchased a large rural property near Woodstock, New Brunswick, formerly owned by Tappan Adney with the intention of establishing a wildlife sanctuary. Her will left the 27 hectare property first to the province of New Brunswick, and secondly to the town of Woodstock. The province did not accept the bequest and the town took title of the land in 1998.
