= Hugh John Flemming Bridge =

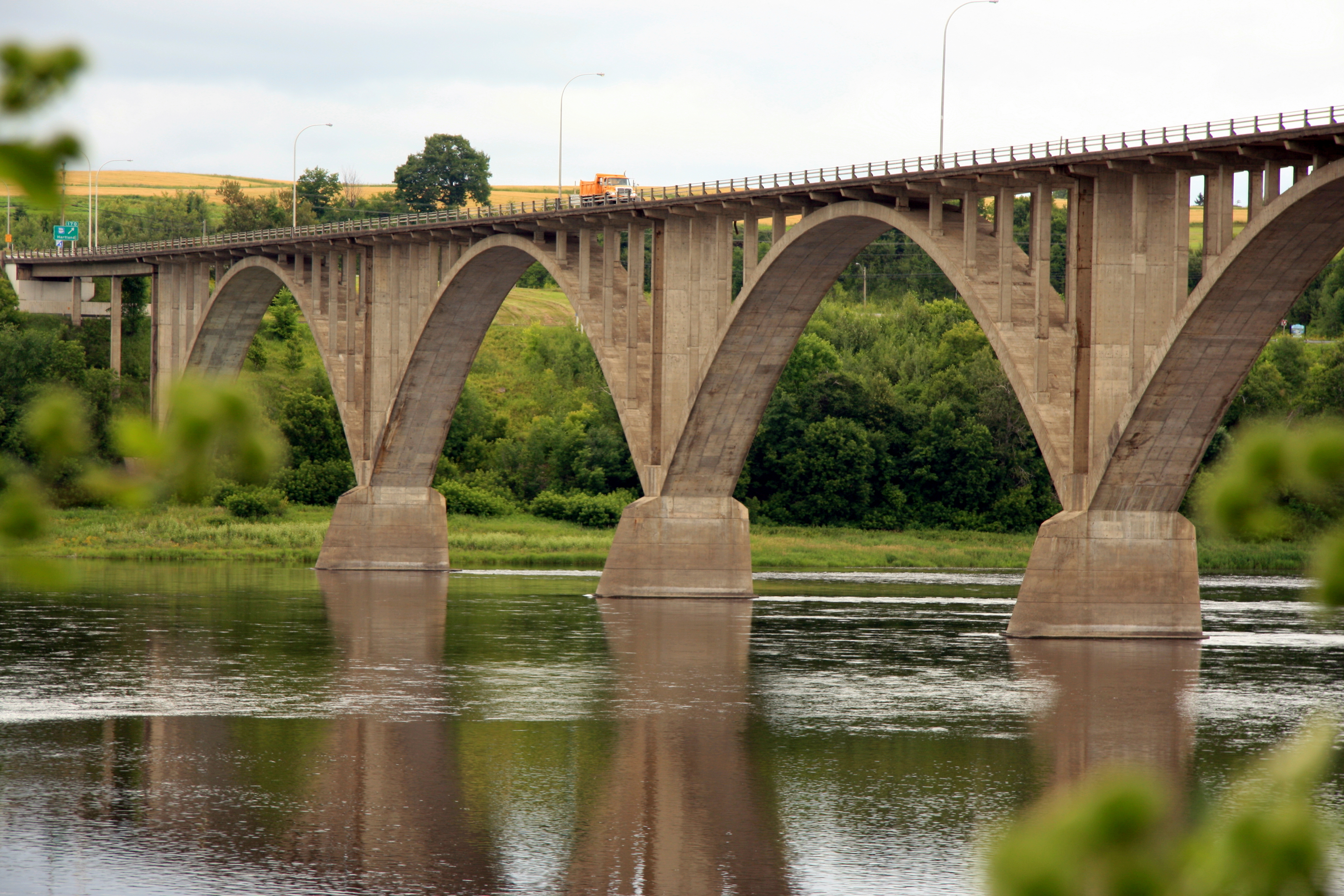
- Coordinates: 46.3058°N 67.5358°W
- Carries: 2 lanes of Route 130
- Crosses: Saint John River
- Locale: Carleton County, New Brunswick
- Owner: Province of New Brunswick

Characteristics
- Design: Multiple arch
- Material: Reinforced concrete
- Total length: 1525 m
- Width: 2 lanes
- Longest span: 83.59 m
- No. of spans: 7

History
- Engineering design by: Foundation of Canada Engineering Corporation Ltd.
- Construction end: 1960

Location
- Interactive map of Hugh John Flemming Bridge

The Hugh John Flemming Bridge is a multi-arch concrete structure which forms part of Route 130 near Hartland, New Brunswick, Canada. It was completed in 1960.

The bridge was built to accommodate the Trans Canada Highway, which opened in 1962. Because it is within view of the famous Hartland Covered Bridge a beautiful design was chosen instead of a less expensive steel-deck truss design. Writes John Leroux: "the government saw the importance of creating an attractive contemporary structure to honour the beauty of the adjacent structure." The design features a series of seven narrow parabolic arches to span the river, inspired by European Expressionist architecture of the 1930s and 30s, specifically the work of Swiss engineer Robert Maillart.

== See also ==
- List of bridges in Canada
