= NBBI =

NBBI may refer to:

- National Board of Boiler and Pressure Vessel Inspectors, a non-profit industry standards organization
- New Brunswick Bible Institute, an evangelical Bible college in rural New Brunswick, Canada
