= Covered Bridge Potato Chips =

Canadian snack food company

- Industry: Snack foods
- Founded: 2009; 17 years ago
- Founders: Matt and Ryan Albright
- Headquarters: Waterville, New Brunswick, Canada
- Products: Storm chips
- Website: coveredbridgechips.com/en/

Covered Bridge Potato Chips is a Canadian kettle potato chip company based in New Brunswick. Their main factory was in Hartland before being destroyed in a fire in 2024, after which operations were relocated to Woodstock.

== History ==
Covered Bridge relies on its family-friendly marketing to compete with bigger potato chip brands in Canada. The business uses russet potatoes for its kettle chips, which are cooked at a lower temperature than traditional potato chips. Covered Bridge uses these differences to market itself as a healthier alternative. The company was founded by Ryan Albright, who entered the business as a way to make his family's potato farming business more profitable. Plant tours were offered to tourists during the summer months, which formed a significant part of their revenue. The company uses equipment that was designed for the production of their chips specifically, with Albright acquiring electrical and welding licenses in order to do so.

In 2016, factory employees struck for five months under the United Food and Commercial Workers union. The labour dispute lasted that long because Covered Bridge did not want to recognize itself as a unionized workplace. Covered Bridge requested that the New Brunswick Labour and Employment Board dismantle the union, which was denied. In 2017, their factory received $867,000 in funding through a mix of provincial and federal loans, in order to perform extensive renovations.

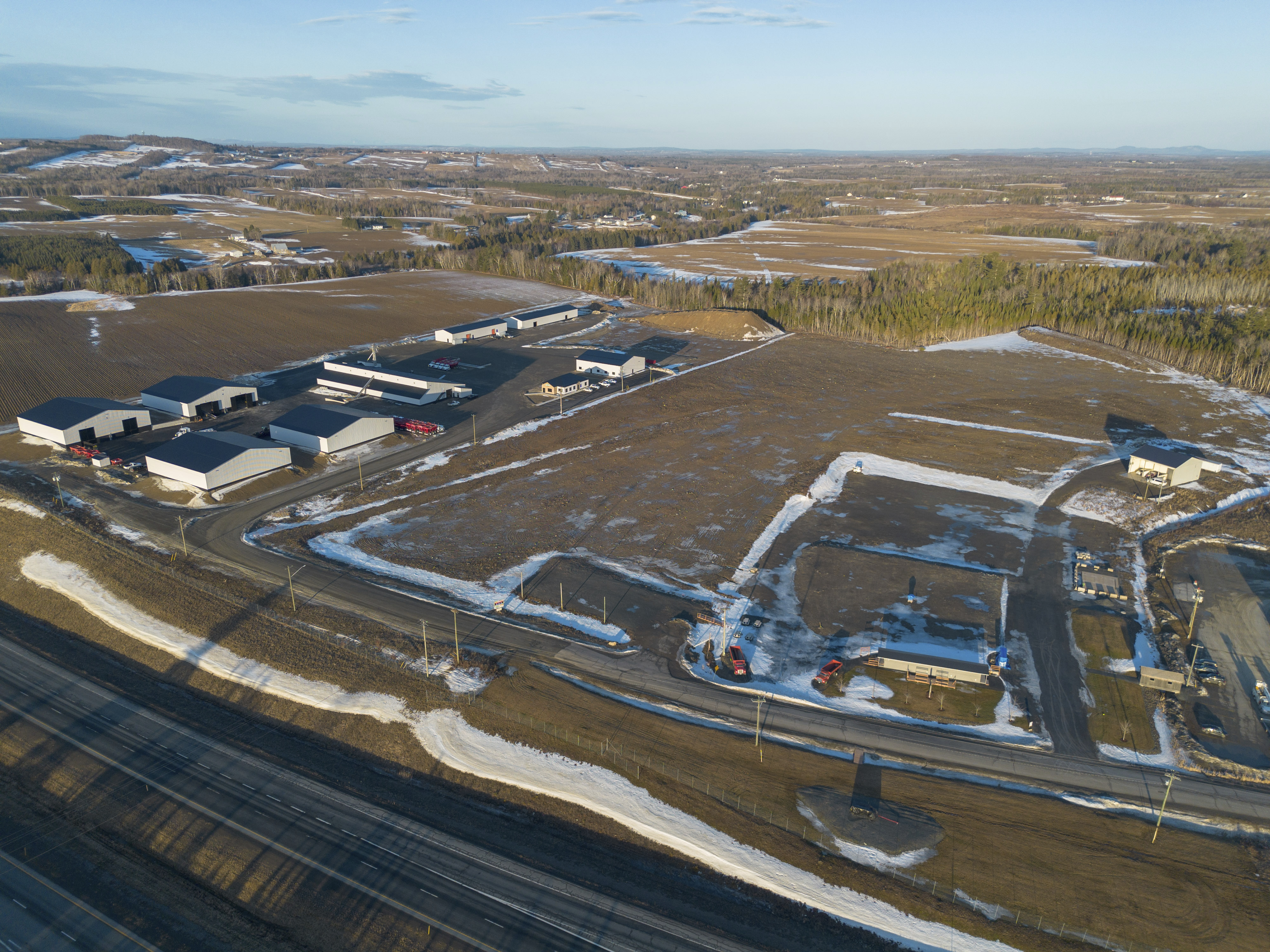
Site of the former Covered Bridge Potato Chips factory, destroyed by fire in 2024.

In March 2024, their factory was destroyed in a fire, which was their main production facility for chips. An accident in the frying room is the suspected cause of the fire. It quickly became out of control and melted all the metal in the building. 120 employees were laid off after the fire. A local church organized an event to fundraise for the impacted employees. The company outsourced its potato chip production to other companies and renovated their warehouse in Woodstock as a "seasoning station" shortly afterwards. In October 2024, Albright was replaced in his position as CEO, after being charged with domestic violence in the United States. Production resumed at their Woodstock facility in September 2025.

== See also ==
- Hartland Covered Bridge
- Storm chips

== Sources ==
- Thiessen, Janis (2017). Snacks: A Canadian Food History. University of Manitoba Press. ISBN 9780887555275.
