= List of historic places in Carleton County, New Brunswick =

This article is a list of historic places in Carleton County, New Brunswick entered on the Canadian Register of Historic Places, whether they are federal, provincial, or municipal.

== List of historic places ==
Name	Address	Coordinates	Government recognition (CRHP №)	Wikidata ID	Image
Armoury	Chapel Street; Woodstock NB	46°09′05″N 67°34′25″W	Federal (4342)		Upload Photo
Bennett House	698 Main Street; Woodstock NB	46°09′10″N 67°34′21″W	Woodstock municipality (9956)		Upload Photo
Bristol Shogomoc Railway Site	9189 Main St. Bristol NB	46°28′22″N 67°34′45″W	Bristol municipality (9674)		Upload Photo
Cambridge Street	Cambridge Street; Woodstock NB	46°09′29″N 67°34′33″W	Woodstock municipality (8543)		Upload Photo
115 Cambridge Street	115 Cambridge Street; Woodstock NB	46°09′28″N 67°34′32″W	Woodstock municipality (8640)		Upload Photo
Capitol Building	114 Queen Street; Woodstock NB	46°08′59″N 67°34′21″W	Woodstock municipality (8613)		Upload Photo
Carleton County Courthouse	689 Main Street; Woodstock NB	46°09′08″N 67°34′22″W	Woodstock municipality (5427)		Upload Photo
Carleton County Jail	108 Maple Street; Woodstock NB	46°09′08″N 67°34′24″W	Woodstock municipality (5316)		Upload Photo
Judge Carleton House	117 Union Street; Woodstock NB	46°08′40″N 67°34′38″W	Woodstock municipality (8503)		Upload Photo
Carleton Lodge No. 41 Independent Order of Oddfellows Hall	115 St. James Street; Woodstock NB	46°09′23″N 67°34′33″W	Woodstock municipality (8545)		Upload Photo
119 Chapel Street	119 Chapel Street; Woodstock NB	46°09′06″N 67°34′32″W	Woodstock municipality (5623)		Upload Photo
149 Chapel Street	149 Chapel Street; Woodstock NB	46°09′10″N 67°34′48″W	Woodstock municipality (5418)		Upload Photo
Dr. Walter Chestnut Library	395 Main Street; Hartland NB	46°17′54″N 67°31′42″W	Hartland municipality (16385)	Q138009936	More images
Church of the Good Shepherd	8772 Main Street; Florenceville-Bristol NB	46°26′35″N 67°37′07″W	Florenceville-Bristol municipality (12363)		Upload Photo
Dr. George Frederick Clarke House	814 Main Street; Woodstock NB	46°09′45″N 67°34′27″W	New Brunswick (10068), Woodstock municipality (5433)	Q112586736	More images
Connell Building	616-620 Main Street; 106 Harvey Street; Woodstock NB	46°08′59″N 67°34′24″W	Woodstock municipality (8575)		Upload Photo
Charles Connell House	128 Connell Street; Woodstock NB	46°09′03″N 67°34′32″W	Federal (11969), Woodstock municipality (4942)	Q5076414	More images
124 Connell Street	124 Connell Street; Woodstock NB	46°09′03″N 67°34′29″W	Woodstock municipality (5417)		Upload Photo
139 Connell Street	139 Connell Street; Woodstock NB	46°09′03″N 67°34′37″W	Woodstock municipality (8231)		Upload Photo
153 Connell Street	153 Connell Street; Woodstock NB	46°09′03″N 67°34′46″W	Woodstock municipality (5524)		Upload Photo
District 14 School Board Office	138 Chapel Street; Woodstock NB	46°09′09″N 67°34′41″W	Woodstock municipality (8589)		Upload Photo
Donaho House	110 Elm Street; Woodstock NB	46°09′19″N 67°34′27″W	Woodstock municipality (8544)		Upload Photo
L. P. Fisher Public Library	679 Main Street; Woodstock NB	46°09′05″N 67°34′24″W	Woodstock municipality (4943)	Q386143	More images
Florenceville Bridge	Jim Davis Drive; Florenceville-Bristol NB	46°26′30″N 67°37′16″W	Florenceville-Bristol municipality (12345)	Q422043	More images
Florenceville-Bristol Community Hall	8696 Main Street; Florenceville-Bristol NB	46°26′19″N 67°37′11″W	Florenceville-Bristol municipality (12366)		Upload Photo
Forester Hall	344 Main Street; Hartland NB	46°17′46″N 67°31′33″W	Hartland municipality (16361)		Upload Photo
103 George Street	103 George Street; Woodstock NB	46°08′35″N 67°34′45″W	Woodstock municipality (5435)		Upload Photo
Government of Canada Building	698 Main Street; Woodstock NB	46°09′05″N 67°34′22″W	Federal (9491)		
106 Green Street	106 Green Street; Woodstock NB	46°09′06″N 67°34′33″W	Woodstock municipality (5426)		Upload Photo
105 Grover Street	105 Grover Street; Woodstock NB	46°09′21″N 67°34′25″W	Woodstock municipality (5424)		Upload Photo
105 Guelph Street	105 Guelph Street; Woodstock NB	46°09′14″N 67°34′20″W	Woodstock municipality (5420)		Upload Photo
Hartland Covered Bridge	31 Main Street; Hartland NB	46°18′00″N 67°32′00″W	Federal (7623), New Brunswick (1330), Hartland municipality (16366)	Q99290	More images
Hartland Salmon Pool	adjacent to and slightly northwest of Main Street, from the mouth of the Becaguimec River along the Saint John River) to a point just upriver from the Hartland Covered Bridge; Hartland NB	46°17′51″N 67°31′47″W	Hartland municipality (16364)		Upload Photo
Hartland Town Hall	31 Orser Street; Hartland NB	46°17′57″N 67°31′38″W	Hartland municipality (16383)		Upload Photo
Holy Trinity Anglican Church	67 Orser Street; Hartland NB	46°18′01″N 67°31′34″W	Hartland municipality (16391)		Upload Photo
Island Park	in the waters of the Saint John River; Woodstock NB	46°08′46″N 67°34′02″W	Woodstock municipality (8540)		Upload Photo
Dr. Lorne MacIntosh Home, Office, and Hospital	340 Main Street; Hartland NB	46°17′46″N 67°31′32″W	Hartland municipality (16384)		Upload Photo
484 Main Street	484 Main Street; Woodstock NB	46°08′36″N 67°34′40″W	Woodstock municipality (5432)		Upload Photo
623-629 Main Street	623-629 Main Street; Woodstock NB	46°09′00″N 67°34′25″W	Woodstock municipality (8576)		Upload Photo
702 Main Street	702 Main Street; Woodstock NB	46°09′11″N 67°34′21″W	Woodstock municipality (8573)		Upload Photo
712 Main Street	712 Main Street; Woodstock NB	46°09′13″N 67°34′20″W	Woodstock municipality (5315)		Upload Photo
E. R. Marich Building	9160 Main Street; Florenceville-Bristol NB	46°28′13″N 67°34′54″W	Florenceville-Bristol municipality (12364)		Upload Photo
Andrew and Laura McCain House	95 Riverview Drive; Florenceville-Bristol NB	46°26′34″N 67°37′40″W	Florenceville-Bristol municipality (12362)		Upload Photo
McLauchlan Building	638 Main Street; Woodstock NB	46°09′00″N 67°34′24″W	Woodstock municipality (8577)		Upload Photo
Meed's Lane	Meed's Lane; Bristol NB	46°28′20″N 67°34′51″W	Bristol municipality (9672)		Upload Photo
Mineral Free Baptist Meetinghouse	245 Doherty Road; Mineral, Kent Parish NB	46°35′23″N 67°35′44″W	New Brunswick (7756)		Upload Photo
Newnham & Slipp Pharmacy	604 Main Street; Woodstock NB	46°08′57″N 67°34′24″W	Woodstock municipality (5425)		Upload Photo
Old Carleton County Court House	19 Court Street; Woodstock NB	46°10′33″N 67°34′32″W	New Brunswick (5885)	Q102225408	More images
Old Free Baptist Church	4710 Juniper Road (Route 107); Florenceville-Bristol NB	46°28′17″N 67°34′31″W	Florenceville-Bristol municipality (12346)		Upload Photo
Old Methodist Cemetery	100 Mountain Street; Woodstock NB	46°08′45″N 67°34′47″W	Woodstock municipality (5429)		Upload Photo
Orange Riot Site	Victoria and Boyne Streets; Woodstock NB	46°09′13″N 67°34′25″W	Woodstock municipality (9883)		Upload Photo
129 Orange Street	129 Orange Street; Woodstock NB	46°09′17″N 67°34′37″W	Woodstock municipality (5419)		Upload Photo
Orser Burial Cemetery	Orser Street; Hartland NB	46°18′00″N 67°31′38″W	Hartland municipality (16562)		Upload Photo
Riverside Park	9173 Main Street; Florenceville-Bristol NB	46°28′17″N 67°34′52″W	Florenceville-Bristol municipality (9673)		Upload Photo
St. David's Presbyterian Church	Route 540; Kirkland, New Brunswick NB	45°58′06″N 67°42′54″W	New Brunswick (7757)		Upload Photo
101 St. James Street	101 St. James Street; Woodstock NB	46°09′24″N 67°34′26″W	Woodstock municipality (8161)		Upload Photo
St. James United Church	120 Chapel Street; Woodstock NB	46°09′07″N 67°34′32″W	Woodstock municipality (9764)		Upload Photo
St. Luke's Anglican Church	104 Church Street; Woodstock NB	46°09′06″N 67°34′21″W	Woodstock municipality (9916)		Upload Photo
Shamrock Suites	8 Curtis Hill Road; Bristol NB	46°28′12″N 67°34′54″W	Bristol municipality (9758)		Upload Photo
Slipp House	135 Union Street; Woodstock NB	46°08′36″N 67°34′44″W	Woodstock municipality (8641)		Upload Photo
Dr. Somerville's Office	9133 Main St. Bristol NB	46°28′13″N 67°35′01″W	Bristol municipality (9690)		Upload Photo
Somerville Residence	9129 Main Street; Bristol NB	46°28′13″N 67°35′01″W	Bristol municipality (9691)		Upload Photo
Sunder House	117 Green Street; Woodstock NB	46°09′11″N 67°34′32″W	Woodstock municipality (5430)		Upload Photo
Trinity United Church of Canada	346 Main Street; Hartland NB	46°17′47″N 67°31′33″W	Hartland municipality (16363)		Upload Photo
Tupper House	142 Connell Street; Woodstock NB	46°09′05″N 67°34′38″W	Woodstock municipality (8542)		Upload Photo
Upper Woodstock Old Tavern and Store	Route 103; Woodstock NB	46°10′33″N 67°34′22″W	New Brunswick (7820)		Upload Photo
110 White Street	110 White Street; Woodstock NB	46°09′08″N 67°34′56″W	Woodstock municipality (5317)		Upload Photo
Winslow House	129 Union Street; Woodstock NB	46°08′38″N 67°34′40″W	Woodstock municipality (8541)		Upload Photo
Wolastoq National Historic Site of Canada	Entire watershed of Saint John River central and western New Brunswick, parts of southeastern Quebec NB	46°10′18″N 67°34′03″W	Federal (18954)	Q18402136	More images
Woodstock Golf and Curling Club	132 St. Andrews Street; Woodstock NB	46°09′25″N 67°35′03″W	Woodstock municipality (10276)		Upload Photo
Woodstock United Baptist Church	694 Main Street; Woodstock NB	46°09′09″N 67°34′21″W	Woodstock municipality (8572)		Upload Photo

== See also ==
- List of historic places in New Brunswick
- List of National Historic Sites of Canada in New Brunswick
