= Somerville, New Brunswick =

Unincorporated community in Carleton County, New Brunswick, Canada

Coordinates: 46°17′42.5″N 67°32′42.8″W

Somerville (2016 pop.: 286) is a Canadian rural community in Carleton County, New Brunswick.

Somerville is located on Route 103 between Wakefield and Hartland. The Hartland Bridge, the longest covered bridge in the world, crosses the Saint John River between Hartland and Somerville.

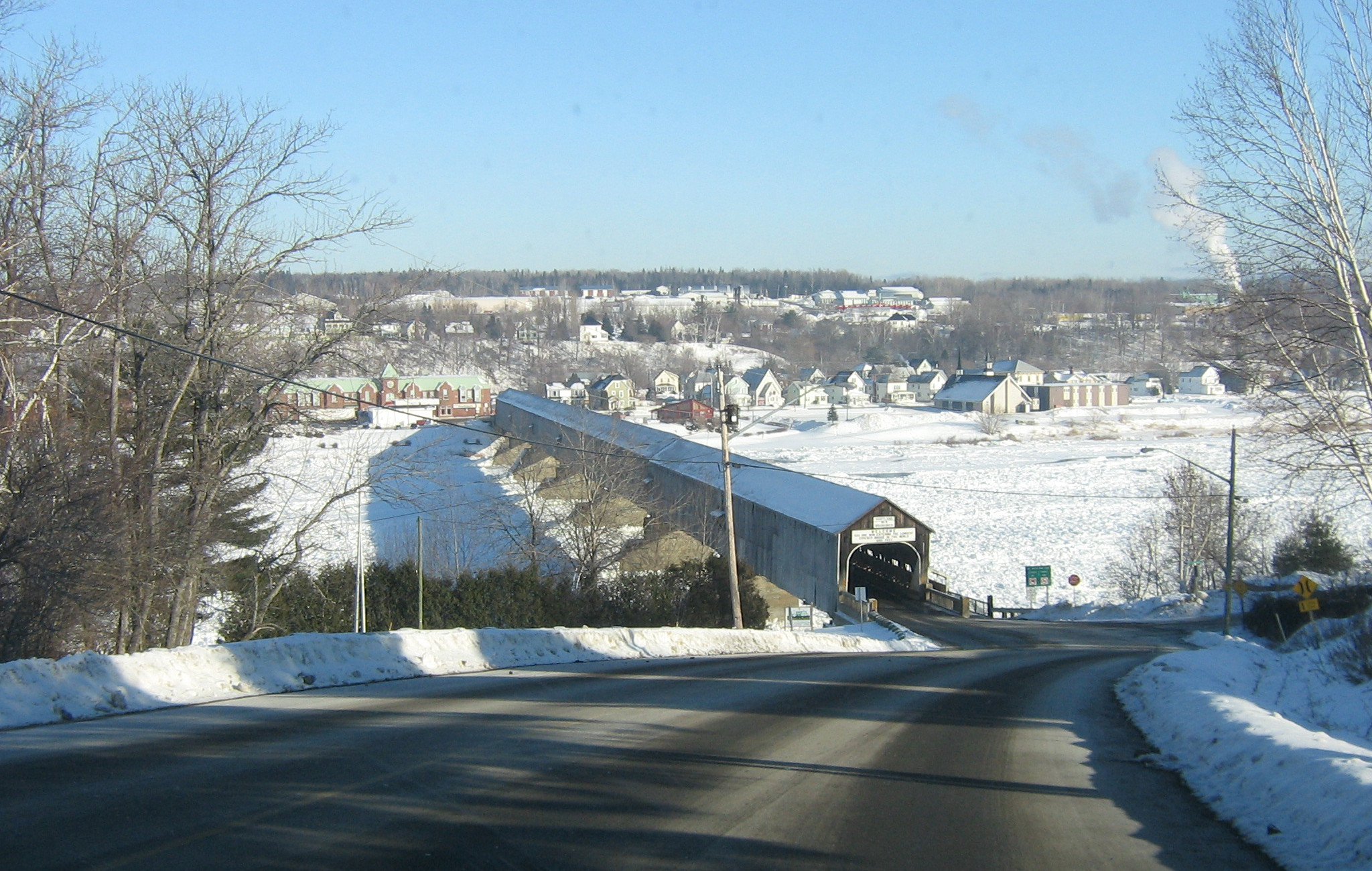
Hartland Bridge, from the Somerville side looking back toward Hartland.

== Demographics ==
In the 2021 Census of Population conducted by Statistics Canada, Somerville had a population of 299 living in 128 of its 135 total private dwellings, a change of 4.5% from its 2016 population of 286. With a land area of 1.62 km^{2} (0.63 sq mi), it had a population density of 184.6/km^{2} (478.0/sq mi) in 2021.

== See also ==
- List of communities in New Brunswick
