= Monks Brook =

River in Hampshire, England

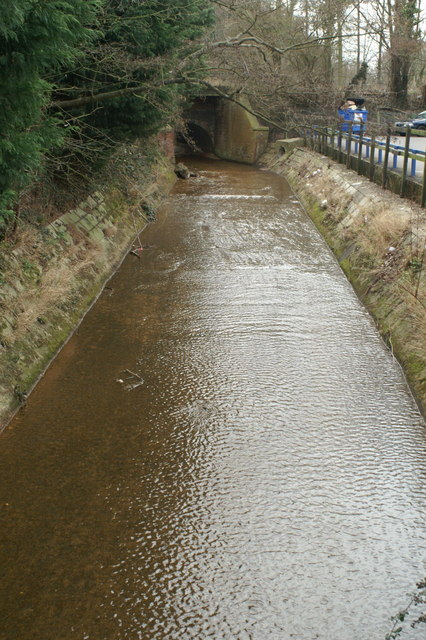
- Monks Brook flowing through Chandler's Ford

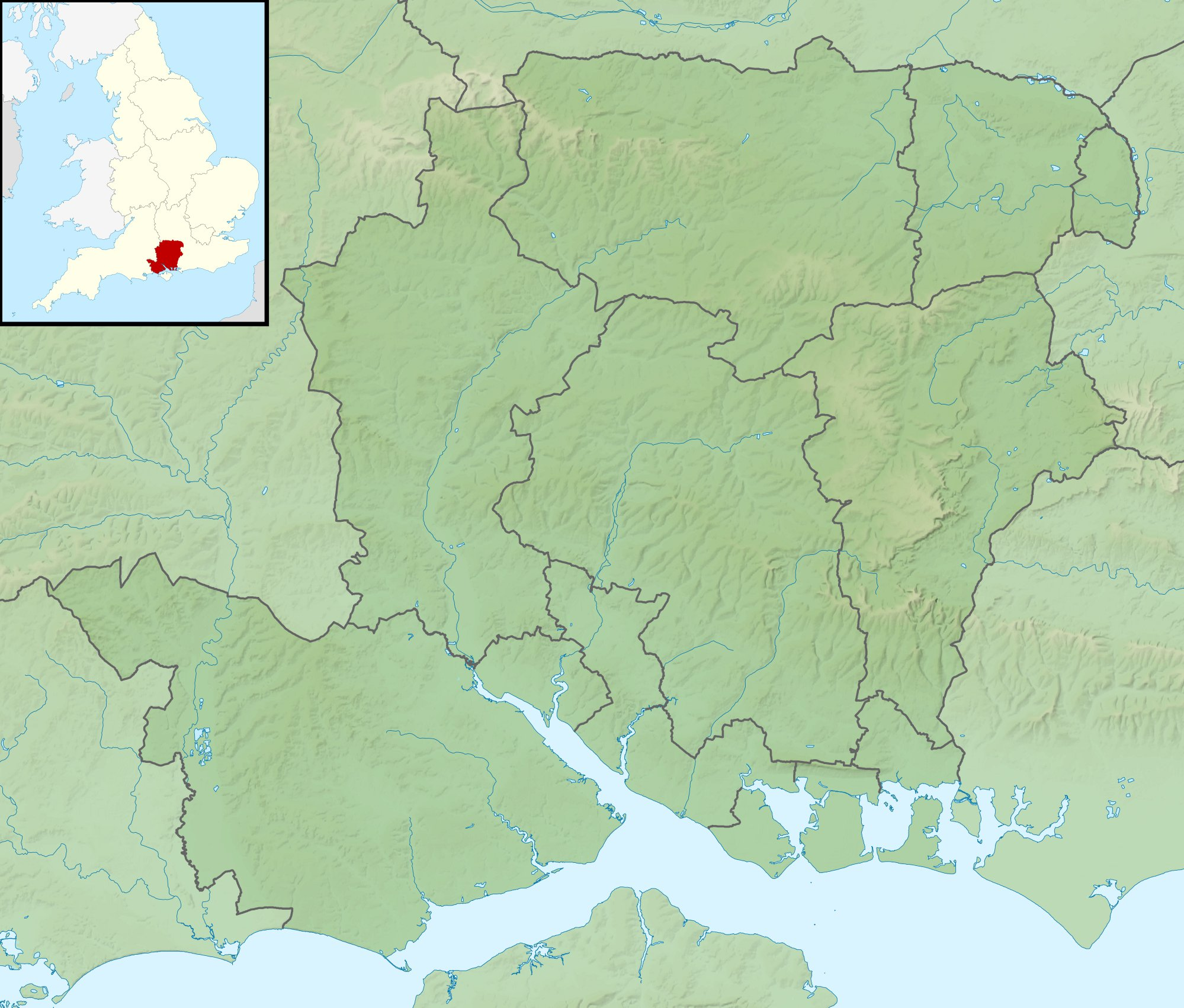
- Location of the mouth of Monks Brook

Location
- Country: England
- Counties: Hampshire

Physical characteristics
- Source: Bucket's Corner
  - location: Hampshire, England
  - coordinates: 50°59′22″N 01°25′30″W
- Mouth
  - location: Swaythling (flows into River Itchen), Hampshire, England
  - coordinates: 50°56′08″N 01°22′33″W
- Basin size: 49 km^{2} (19 sq mi)
- Discharge
  - average: 0.25 m^{3}/s (8.8 cu ft/s)

Monks Brook is a river in the English county of Hampshire. It is a tributary of the River Itchen, which it joins at a medieval salmon pool in Swaythling. The brook is formed from seven streams that rise in the chalky South Downs, with the official source of Monks Brook being known as Bucket's Corner. Monks Brook drains a clay catchment of 49 square kilometres (19 sq mi). The brook is designated a main river, which means the operating authority for managing it is the Environment Agency, not the local government authorities for the areas through which the river runs.

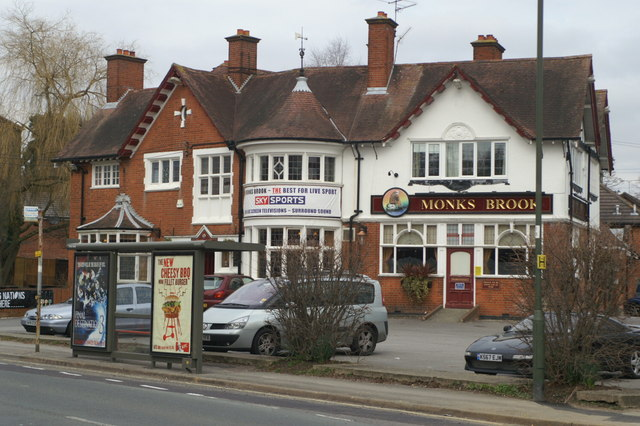
Monks Brook pub

The brook has given its name to a pub, a street in the town of Eastleigh, a junior football team and a petrol station among other things.

In 2007, a 250 metres (820 feet) stretch of a tributary to the brook that had been culverted in the 1970s to make way for a golf course was uncovered as part of a £2.5 million community regeneration project.

== History ==
Monks Brook was documented in a charter in 932, in which King Athelstan granted the estate of North Stoneham to a man named Alfred. In this charter, Monks Brook was used as the boundary of the estate. It is thought the brook was created in Saxon times to prevent flooding of a field associated with South Stoneham.

The river took its current name much later, however, with the monks of Hyde Abbey near Winchester, who were the owners of the North Stoneham Estate in the 14th century. However originally the name only applied to that northern portion of the brook, with the southern reaches referred to as Swaethling Well in a charter relating to South Stoneham in 1045. The Old English word Swaethling is believed to mean "misty stream" and the settlement of Swaythling is thought to be named after Monks Brook.

== Course ==
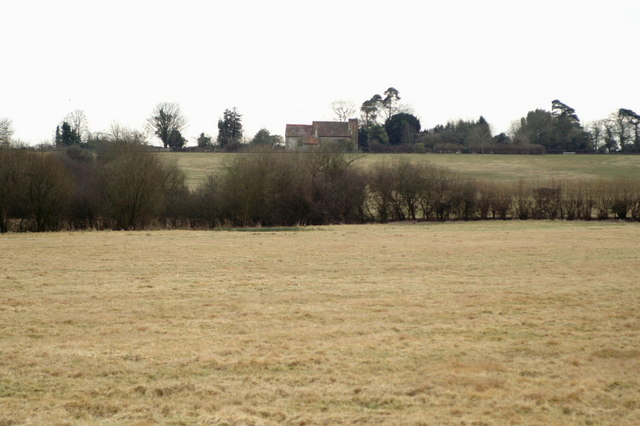
The source of Monks Brook is located under the hedgerow in the foreground of this photograph

The source, Bucket Corner (sometimes Bucket's Corner), is located to the west of Chandler's Ford, north of St John the Baptist Church, North Baddesley (at 50°59′22″N 01°25′30″W). The stream flows initially north-eastwards, past Trodds Copse Site of Special Scientific Interest, turning east when it meets the Eastleigh to Romsey railway line to run parallel to the railway. Both river and railway turn southeastwards as they enter Chandler's Ford itself, with Monks Brook crossing under the railway to run along the north bank of a cutting before they pass underneath Flexford Road. Here, a tributary joins the main stream from the north and the brook turns to the south, once again crossing under the railway. The brook continues to run roughly parallel to the railway line until shortly before Chandler's Ford railway station, where another tributary joins from the west and the brook flows underneath the railway line and the Hursley Road/Winchester Road roundabout in Chandler's Ford.

The brook then continues to flow southeastwards on the north side of the railway line before turning south away from the railway as they approach the M3 motorway. Monks Brook passes under Weardale Road and flows southwards between Skipton Road and Steele Close before entering a short tunnel that takes it under Leigh Road (the A335), then subsequent tunnels under the M3 motorway and junction 13 sliproad and into Fleming Park in Eastleigh. Here the brook continues to flow mainly due south, between Magpie Lane and Passfield Avenue, crossing under Nightingale Avenue on the way.

After passing under Chestnut Avenue, Monks Brook continues to flow southwards with Monks Brook Close immediately to the east and Stoneham Lane on the west. There is a flow measuring station on Monks Brook at Stoneham Lane, managed by the Environment Agency on behalf of the Centre for Ecology and Hydrology's National River Flow Archive. At this point, the brook has an average flow of 0.23 cubic metres (8.12 cu ft) per second.

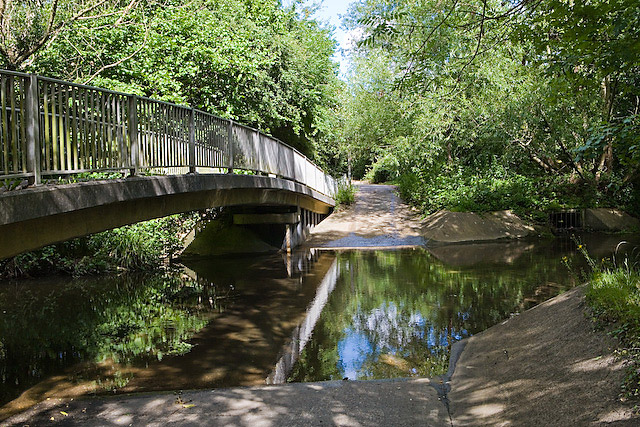
Doncaster Drove, a byway off Stoneham Lane, crosses Monks Brook by footbridge and ford

The brook continues to flow south, parallel to Stoneham Lane, and passing close to the lakes of Lakeside Country Park. The brook then passes under the A335 close to Southampton Airport and under the M27 motorway just to the east of Junction 5. (In fact, the brook passes under the sliproads of that junction too).

The brook continues to flow south before turning slightly southwestwards to run parallel with another railway, the South West main line, which the brook eventually flows under and emerges alongside the Fleming Arms public house (named after the arms of Thomas Fleming) in Swaythling, on the Mansbridge (A27) road. After flowing under the A27, the brook continues southwards, passing the rear of South Stoneham church, entering the grounds of the Wessex Lane Halls. Here, Monks Brook was a feature of the gardens of South Stoneham House, landscaped by Capability Brown and feeds a large salmon pool. It is from these grounds that the brook flows into the River Itchen, at Woodmill opposite the upper section of Southampton's Riverside Park (at 50°56′8″N 01°22′33″W).

== Natural history ==
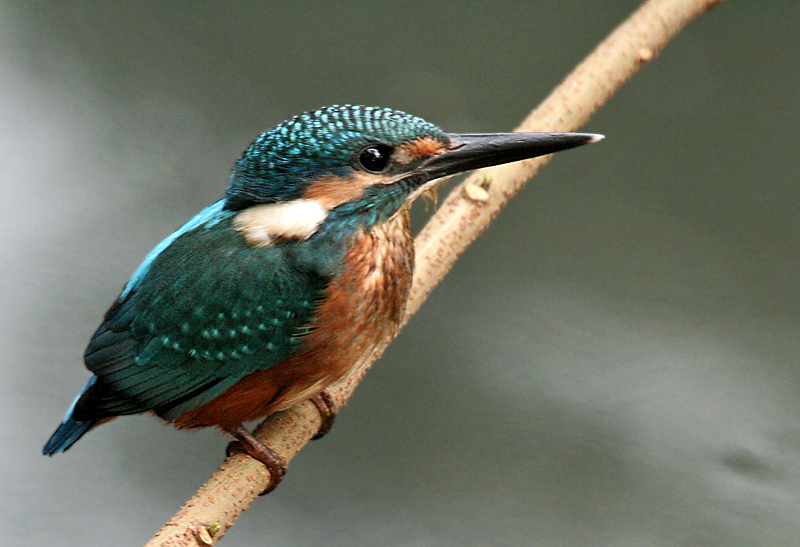
The common kingfisher, one of the species supported by Monks Brook

Between Eastleigh and Southampton, the brook and its immediate surrounds form a green corridor which is reportedly home to roe deer, lizards, kingfishers, wasp spiders and slowworms. In the meadows beside the brook, badgers have been seen foraging for worms. There have also been claims that the brook supports important species such as the great crested newt and otters.

Further upstream, on the western side of Chandlers Ford, the brook once again forms a green corridor and is a nature reserve, bordered by large alder trees. Wildflowers in the area include bluebells, yellow archangels and Solomon's seal. Closer to the stream bank itself, wild garlic grows profusely, and wild birds to be seen include the kingfisher and grey wagtail.

A 2005 report stated that the water in the uppermost reaches of Monks Brook is relatively acidic and does not support much life.

== Water quality ==
The Environment Agency measure water quality of the river systems in England. Each is given an overall ecological status, which may be one of five levels: high, good, moderate, poor and bad. There are several components that are used to determine this, including biological status, which looks at the quantity and varieties of invertebrates, angiosperms and fish. Chemical status, which compares the concentrations of various chemicals against known safe concentrations, is rated good or fail.

Water quality of Monks Brook in 2019:

Section	Ecological Status	Chemical Status	Length	Catchment	Channel
Monks Brook	Moderate	Fail	11.301 km (7.022 mi)	57.381 km^{2} (22.155 sq mi)	Heavily modified

In August 2019 the Environment Agency reported that fuel oil had spilled into Monks Brook and they had installed booms across the water to attempt to clear it up. This followed a similar incident in August 2018 when an oily substance which smelled like paint had been observed in the water. The brook was contaminated with fuel again in May 2021. In 2023, a continuous flow of an oily substance was once again observed flowing along the river, with local residents claiming this a regular occurrence especially after heavy rainfall. In response the Environment Agency installed booms across the brook to try and capture the oil, and were trying to investigate the cause of the pollution.

== List of settlements ==
Monks Brook passes through the following settlements (ordered from mouth to source):

- Swaythling
- Mansbridge
- Eastleigh
- Chandler's Ford
