= Lakeside Country Park =

Railway park in the United Kingdom

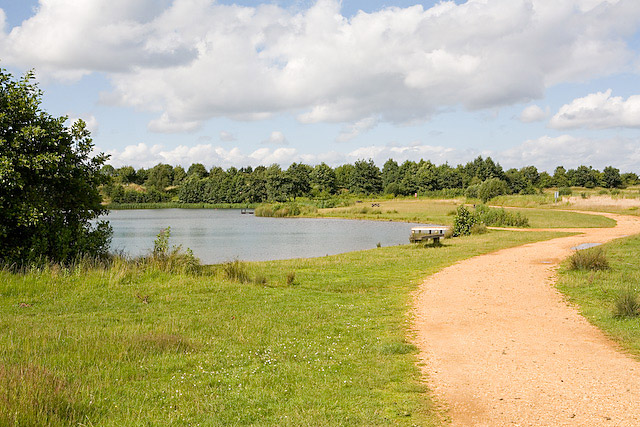
- Beach Lake, one of the three lakes in the park
- Interactive map of Lakeside Country Park
- Type: Country park
- Location: Eastleigh, Hampshire, UK
- Coordinates: 50.957°N 1.364°W
- Area: 60 acres (240,000 m^{2})
- Operator: Eastleigh Borough Council
- Status: Open all year

Lakeside Country Park is a country park just south of the town of Eastleigh in Hampshire. The park covers 60 acres and is home to the Eastleigh Lakeside Steam Railway.

The park is on the site of old gravel workings, with lakes formed from gravel pits. As well as the lakes themselves, the park boasts meadows and some young woodland.

The park is bounded by the Eastleigh urban area to the north, the A335 road to the east, the boundary between Eastleigh and Southampton to the south, and Monks Brook to the west.

== Eastleigh Lakeside Railway ==
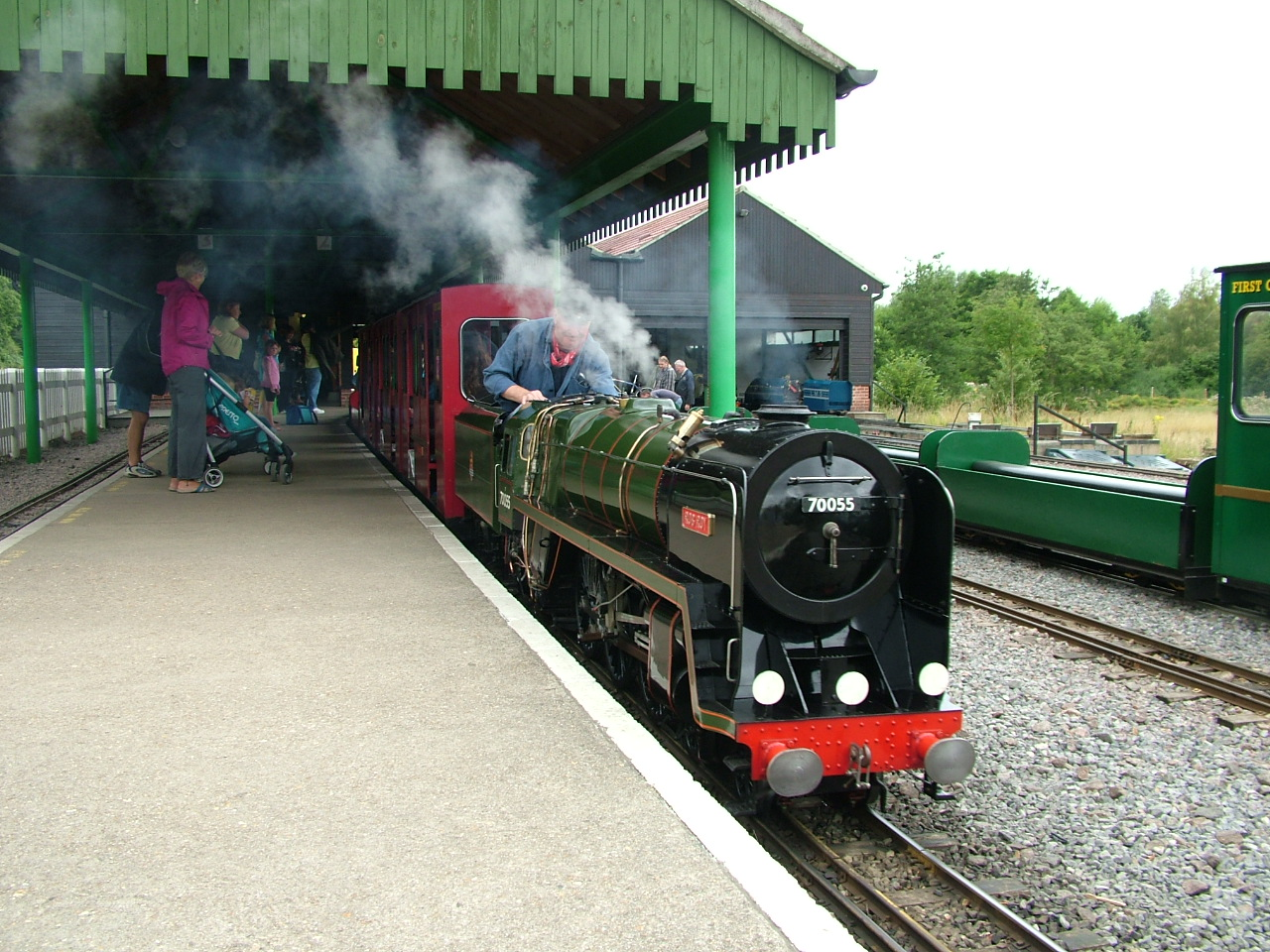
Eastleigh Lakeside station is the centre of operations for the Eastleigh Lakeside Railway

A dual gauge 10 1/4 in (260 mm) / 7 1/4 in (184 mm) light railway was established in the park in 1992, originally as a temporary layout. A more permanent track was laid down in 1993, as the railway company was granted a three-year lease. Five years later, a longer lease was negotiated and construction began on the two stations, Eastleigh Parkway and Monks Brook. They were opened in 1999, although further work on the layout itself was carried out in 2000. A tunnel was added in 2003, and Eastleigh Parkway station was extended in 2005 with the addition of a café and shop.

Number	Name	Type	Railway	Gauge	Notes	Image
1001	The Monarch	Steam	ELR	10.25		1001 The Monarch
1002	The Empress	Steam	Example	10.25		The Empress
1003	Western Queen	Steam	SBCR	10.25	Western Queen 1003	
2005	Silver Jubilee	Steam	SBCR	10.25		2005 Silver Jubilee
2006	Edward VIII	Steam	SBCR	10.25		Edward VIII Train
7	Sandy River	Steam	ELR	10.25		Sandy River
70055	Rob Roy	Steam	British Rail	10.25		Rob Roy ELR
4498	Sir Nigel Gresley	Steam	LNER	10.25		Sir Nigel Gresley ELR
10	Sir Arthur Heywood	Steam	ELR	7.25		Heywood
4789	William Baker	Steam	Atlantic	7.25		
3	Francis Henry Lloyd	Steam	ELR	7.25		
1908	Ernest Henry Upton	Steam	london Brighton and south coast railway	10.25		
D1994	Eastleigh	Diesel	ELR	10.25		
92	Florence	Diesel	ELR	10.25		
N/A	David Curwen	Steam	DR	7.25		
761	Taw	Steam	SOUTHERN	7.25		
3007	Firefly	Steam	KMR	10.25		
2011	Coronation	Steam	10.25			

== Water sports centre ==
In 2014 funding was approved towards the replacement of the lakeside buildings with two new buildings with improved toilets and changing facilities, storage, offices and a multi-purpose function room. The estimated cost of the scheme is £2.5 million, of which £1 million had been allocated from the New Homes Bonus and £371,000 from the Eastleigh Local Area Committee. The new buildings were completed in late 2016.

Open water swimming clubs have been run from the venue since at least 2010, and, as of 2017, swimming sessions are currently operated by HOWL Multisports.
