= Salmon pool =

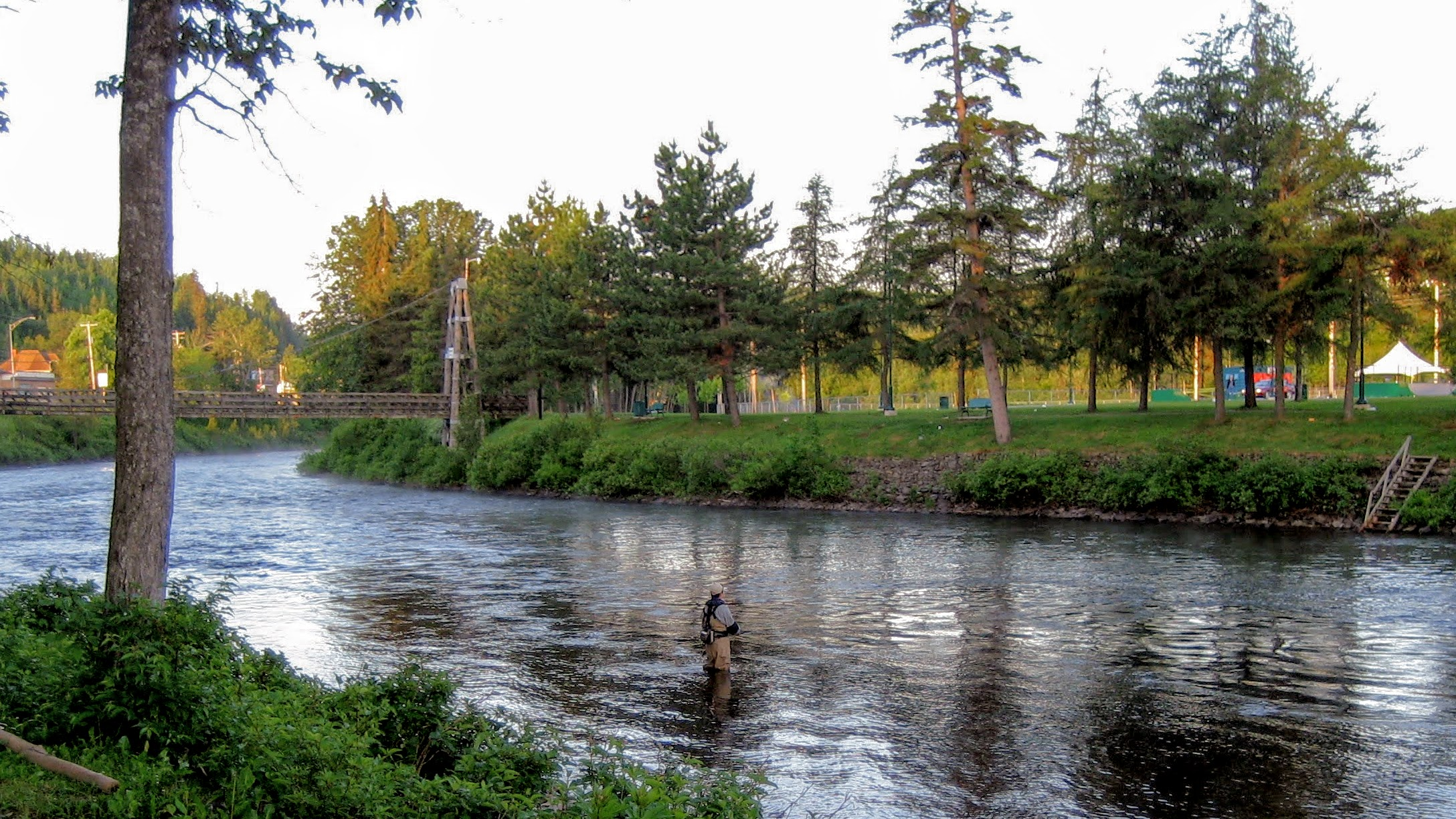
Salmon fisher on the Matapédia River, Causapscal, Quebec (Les Fourches pit)

A salmon pool is a name for a rocky depression in a riverbed, where salmon are known to gather to rest and feed, and from where they can be successfully caught. In England, they are known as stells.

== Known salmon pools ==
- Monks Brook
- Matapedia River
- Chéticamp River
- Miramichi River
- New Brunswick has more than 22
- Bangor Salmon Pool
- Underground Salmon Pool near Roddickton, Newfoundland

== Former salmon pools ==
Salmon pools are located in the shallows of rivers. Dams and other activities that raise the heights of rivers can ruin pools for fishing.

- Hartland Salmon Pool

== See also ==
- Environmental issues with salmon
