= Trodds Copse =

Protected area in Hampshire, England

- Site of Special Scientific Interest
- Location within Hampshire
- Location of Trodds Copse.
- Area of search: Hampshire
- Grid reference: SU417224
- Coordinates: 50.99858°N 1.40612°W
- Interest: Biological
- Area: 25.23 ha (62.3 acres)
- Notification date: 1989

Trodds Copse (grid reference SU417224) is a 25.23 hectare biological Site of Special Scientific Interest (SSSI), in central Hampshire, notified in 1989. It comprises ancient semi-natural woodland, unimproved meadows and flushes.

== Location ==
The copse is situated to the north-west of Chandler's Ford between Flexford Road and Hook Road and adjoins the Eastleigh to Romsey railway line.

== Description ==
The citation for the SSSI says:

Trodds Copse Site of Special Scientific Interest comprises ancient semi-natural woodland, unimproved meadows and flushes overlying Bracklesham Beds, Bagshot Sand, peat and alluvium. The habitats are drained by tributaries of the Monks Brook, a branch of the River Itchen. The diverse geology and varied drainage conditions give rise to a wide range of habitats. At least ten woodland types can be identified, of which four are considered nationally rare. The diversity of woodland types is matched by an extremely rich ground flora. The antiquity of the woodlands is reflected in the very high number of ancient woodland indicator species recorded within the site. Over fifty such species occur, including a number of rare or local plants such as tutsan (Hypericum androsaemum) making it one of the botanically richest woods in Hampshire.

== History ==
Trodds Copse and surrounding land has been well documented since the late 16th century. The whole site was enclosed from common land prior to 1588 and woodland boundary banks can be clearly discerned. Some areas were managed as wood pasture but by the early 19th century this practice had ceased, the land being converted to pasture or coppice woodland.

The site is threatened by the north-westerly expansion of Chandler's Ford. In 1990, a planning application to build 200 houses and a golf course at neighbouring Broadgate Farm, Ampfield was refused as it "would result in the destruction of part of the Trodds Copse Countryside Heritage Site".

== Flora ==
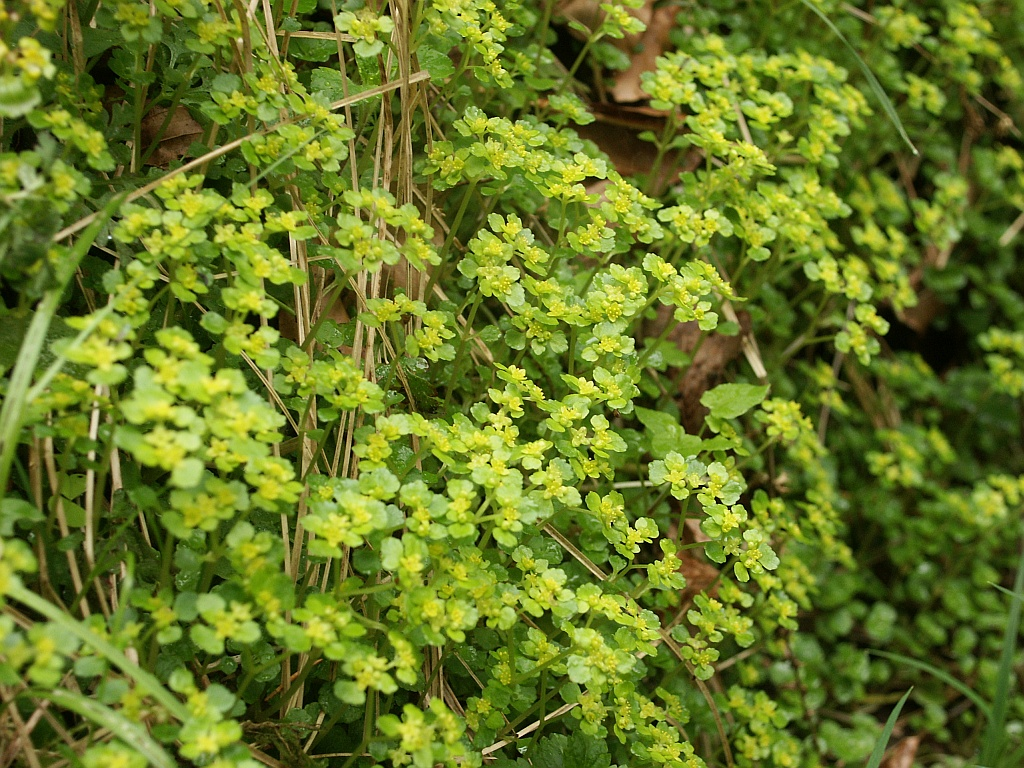
Chrysosplenium oppositifolium

Among the many tree and plant species found at Trodds Copse are:

- Maple Acer campestre
- Alder Alnus glutinosa
- Common Hazel Corylus avellana
- Alder buckthorn Frangula alnus
- Common Ash Fraxinus excelsior
- Pedunculate Oak Quercus robur
- Rowan Sorbus aucuparia
- Sneezewort Achillea ptarmica
- Velvet bent Agrostis canina
- Tall oat Arrhenatherum elatius

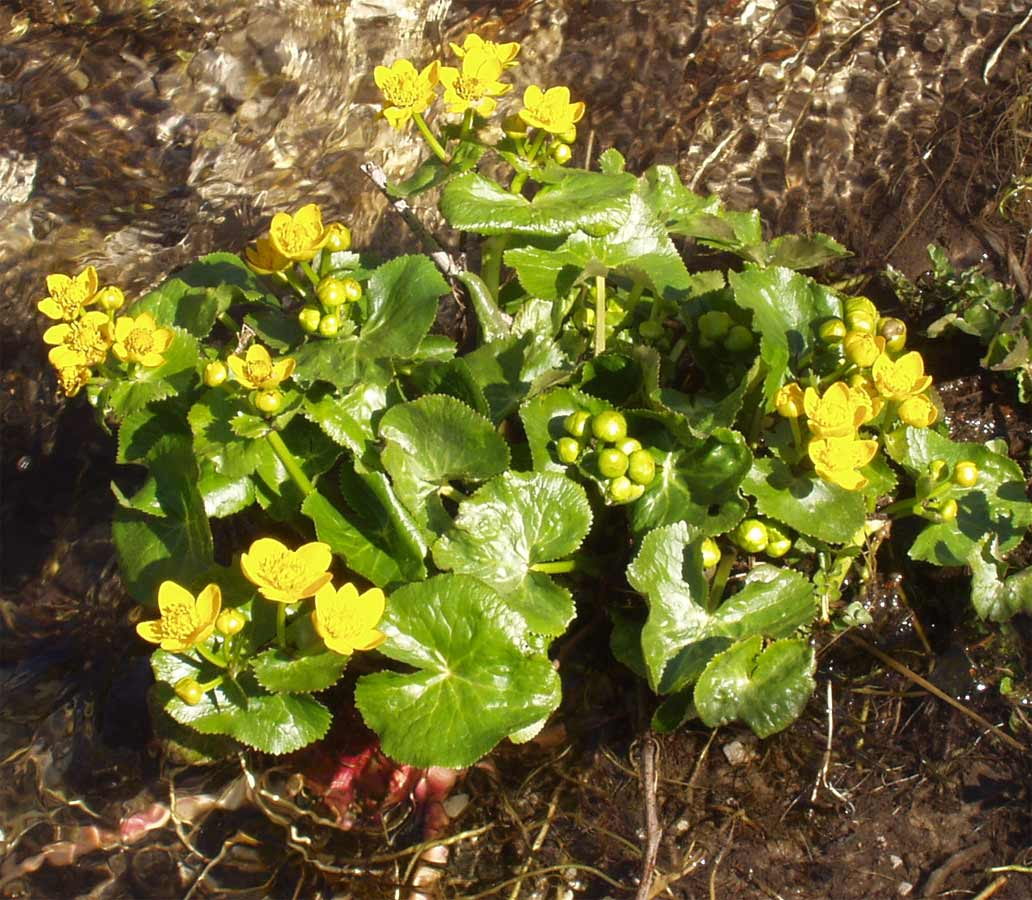
Caltha palustris

- Marsh marigold Caltha palustris
- Brown sedge Carex disticha
- Smooth-stalked sedge C. laevigata
- Tussock sedge C. paniculata
- Remote sedge C. remota
- Opposite-leaved golden saxifrage Chrysosplenium oppositifolium
- Purple loosestrife Epipactis purpurata
- Meadowsweet Filipendula ulmaria
- Marsh bedstraw Galium palustre
- Fen bedstraw G. uliginosum
- Water avens Geum rivale
- Ivy Hedera helix
- Yorkshire fog Holcus lanatus
- Tutsan Hypericum androsaemum

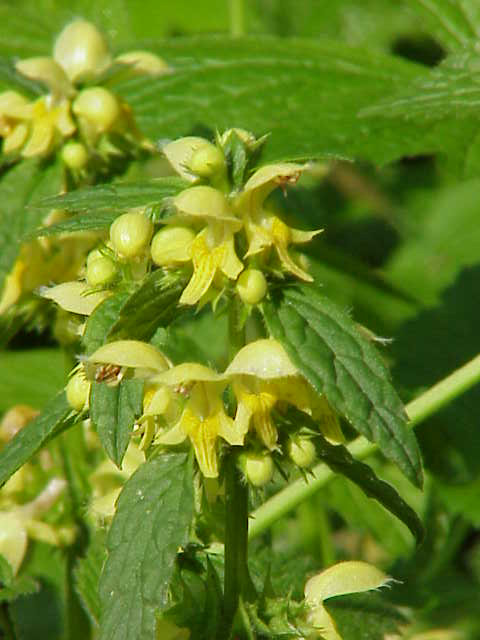
Lamiastrum galeobdolon

- Sharp-flowered rush Juncus acutiflorus
- Yellow archangel Lamiastrum galeobdolon
- Honeysuckle Lonicera periclymenum
- Gipysywort Lycopus europaeus
- Yellow loosestrife Lysimachia vulgaris
- Cyclamen-flowered Daffodil Narcissus cyclamineus
- Bramble Rubus fruticosus
- Wood club rush Scirpus sylvaticus
- Bog mosses including
  - Sphagnum palustre
  - S. flexuosum
  - Sphagnum recurvum var. mucronatum
- Devil’s bit scabious Succisa pratensis
- Branched bur-reed Sparganium erectum

== Fauna ==
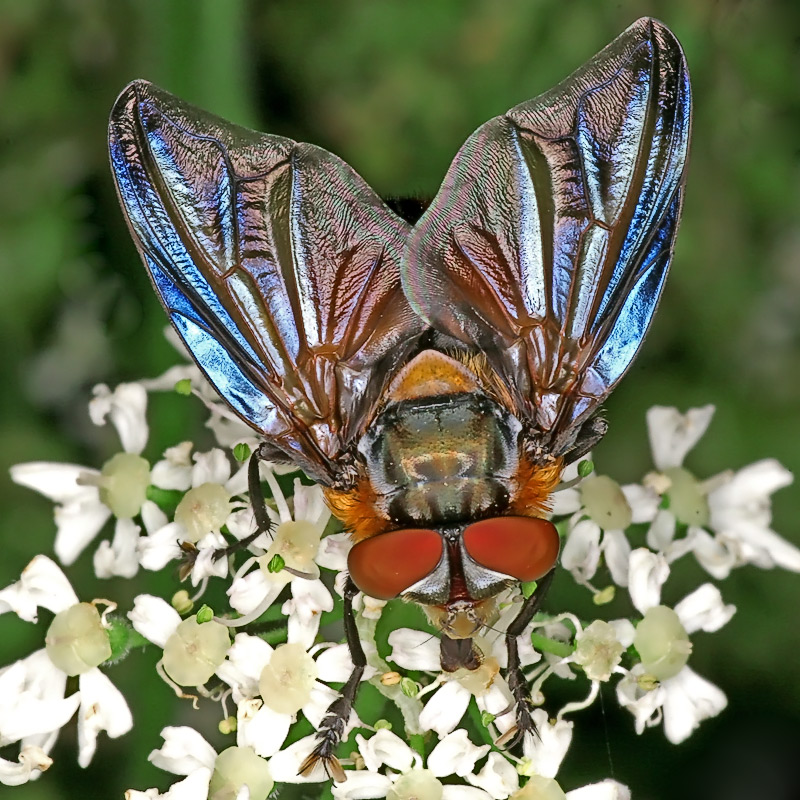
Phasia hemiptera

The wide range of habitats is reflected by the diverse invertebrate fauna present within the site, including:

- Hoverfly Criorhina asilica
- Robber fly Choerades marginatus
- Solitary bee Macropis europaea
- Tachinid fly Phasia hemiptera
- Hoverfly Volucella inflata
