= Storm chips =

Cultural phenomenon in Atlantic Canada

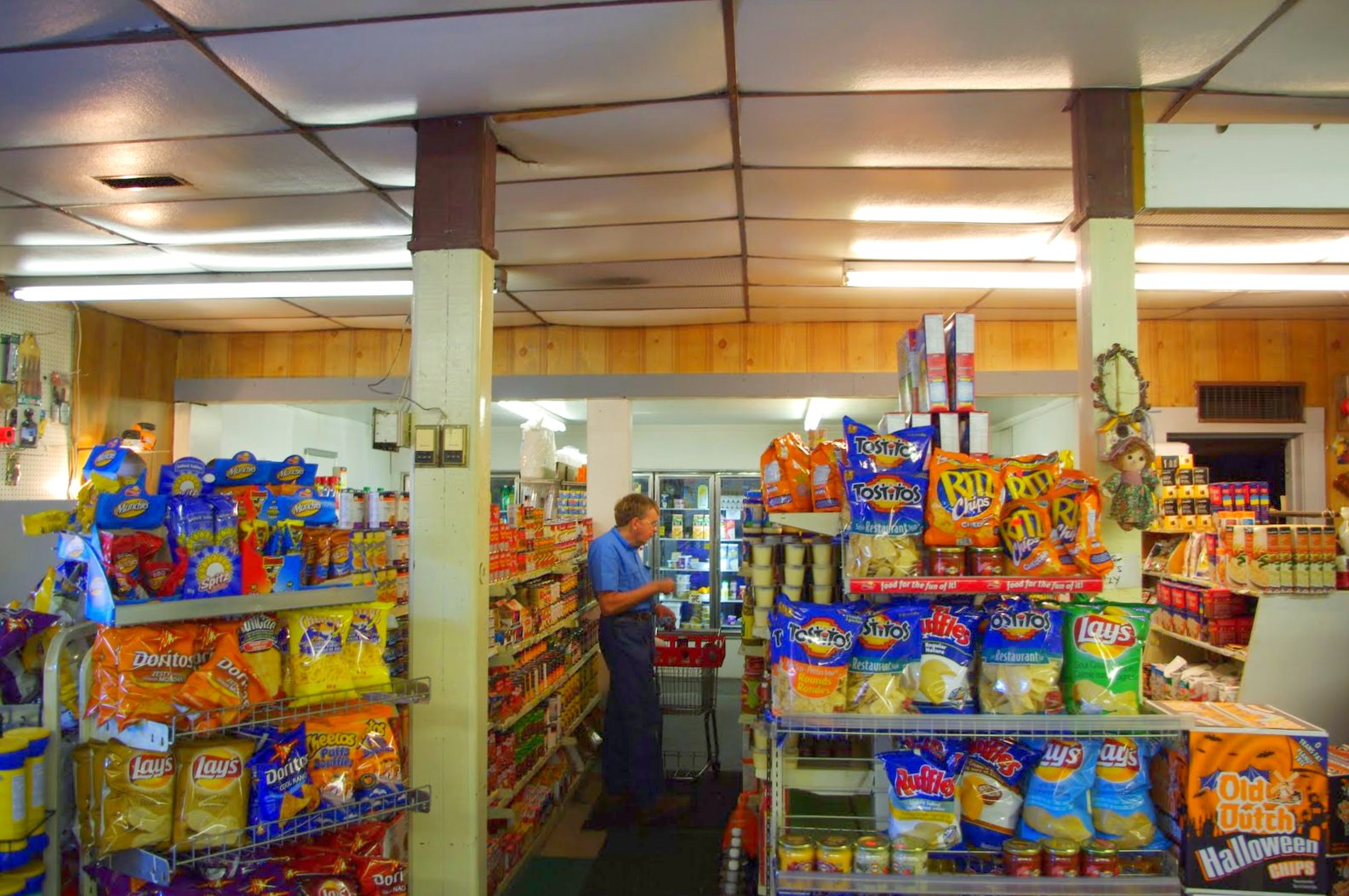
A convenience store in Nova Scotia with a selection of potato chips

In Atlantic Canada, the term storm chips refers to a cultural phenomenon of purchasing potato chips in preparation for a storm. The term originates from a radio broadcast by Stephanie Domet on CBC Radio One in January 2014, during which she discussed an upcoming storm with the station's news reader, Ryan Pierce. Domet expressed her intention to purchase chips and dip to prepare for the storm, and Pierce replied that he was also considering what snacks to purchase. Following the broadcast, Domet posted a photograph of her chips and dip on Twitter with the caption "Success! #stormchips". The hashtag subsequently went viral in the region, and since then, storm chips have been positioned as an element of Atlantic Canadian identity.

The political sociologist Howard Ramos states that "storm chips took off because people can relate to it." He argues that buying potato chips before a storm gives people a sense of control, stating that "buying chips is something inexpensive we can do that makes us feel like we're doing something to prepare for the storm."

Various regional companies have marketed their products around the idea of storm chips. The Newfoundland and Labrador Liquor Corporation published a guide for beer and wine storm chip pairings, while Covered Bridge Potato Chips of New Brunswick created their own storm chips product with a blend of four flavours in one bag. Covered Bridge trademarked the name "storm chips" soon after it began catching on, eventually marketing their storm chips product across Canada and in the United States.

The phenomenon has resulted in a significant increase in sales of potato chips prior to a storm in Atlantic Canada. While the term has come to be applied to other snacks, such as storm pizza or storm chocolates, none of these have gained popularity in the same way as storm chips.
