= Juniper, New Brunswick =

Hamlet in New Brunswick, Canada

Coordinates: 46.550000°N 67.216667°W

Juniper (2001 pop.: 450) is a hamlet in Carleton County, New Brunswick, Canada. Juniper is located in Aberdeen Parish. It is situated on Route 107, which runs from Route 105 at Bristol, northeast to Juniper, and then bends southeast towards Napadogan and Deersdale. Geographic coordinates: 46° 33' North, 67° 13' West; elevation 899 ft.

Juniper is named for the low growing juniper shrub which allegedly grows in the boggy spruce forest near Juniper Station.

The local economy is largely forestry-based, which employs roughly half of the population. In November 2006, the village started experiencing trouble keeping its paper mills open due to a decrease in the price of paper.

The economy also benefits from some hunting and fishing-related tourism, as the village is on the South Branch of the Southwest Miramichi River, renowned for its salmon and trout fishing.

The nearby Juniper Barrens String Bog, the largest bog in the area, covers 12 square kilometres, and is home to the White Fringed Orchid (Platanthera blepharglottis), an uncommon type of Butterfly Orchid, and the sedge (grass) Carex eburnea. The peat is two to three metres deep. The bog is one of several unique sites in Maine and the Maritime Provinces of Canada, featured on the Irving Forest Discovery Network.

Juniper's post office dates from 1918.

== Religion ==
The village has three churches, Roman Catholic, United Church of Canada, and a United Pentecostal Church.

== Education ==
The village is in School District 14 and has one public school, Juniper Elementary School, formerly Juniper High School.

== Transportation ==
A line of the Canadian national Railway passes through Juniper.

== Notable people ==
The best known resident of the village was the Right Honourable Hugh John Flemming, Premier of New Brunswick and Canadian Federal Minister of Forestry, who was the son of Sarah and the Right Honourable James Kidd Flemming, a Premier of New Brunswick himself. He went to work at his family's mill, Flemming and Gibson, in Juniper at the age of fifteen, but retired to a home near Woodstock, New Brunswick, after retiring from Parliament in 1972, and also in Fredericton, New Brunswick.

Flemming's wife, Aida Flemming, founded the International Kindness Club for Children, a club to teach children to love and be kind to animals, and was active in a number of charities.

The New Brunswick Kindness Club now has members in many provinces and countries, including every Canadian province, the Yukon Territory, the United States, India, England, France, Norway, the West Indies, Belize, Ireland, Australia, Korea, Japan, and many countries in Africa. Doctor Albert Schweitzer, famous for his medical and humanitarian work, served as an Honorary President of the International Kindness Club, before it was incorporated into the Humane Society of the United States (HSUS), of which Mrs. Flemming became an honorary board member.

== See also ==
- List of communities in New Brunswick
