= Victoria Corner, New Brunswick =

Victoria Corner
- Village
- Nickname: The Corner
- Location within New Brunswick
- Coordinates: 46.266667°N 67.516667°W
- Country: Canada
- Provinces of Canada: New Brunswick
- County: Carleton County
- Parish: Wakefield Parish
- Founded: c. 1806 (as Bowyers Corner)

Government
  - Type: Town Council

Population (1901) From Statistics Canada
  - Total: 160
- Time zone: UTC-4 (AST)
  - Summer (DST): UTC-3 (ADT)
- Canadian Postal code: E7P
- Area code: 506

Victoria Corner, New Brunswick is a community in Carleton County, New Brunswick, Canada located on the west side of the Saint John River, 3.71 km north of Wakefield, 10 miles from Woodstock, on the road to Somerville.

== History ==
It was formerly called Bowyers Corner for Charles Bowyer, who was an early settler.

Victoria Corner has been home to the New Brunswick Bible Institute, since 1944.

== See also ==
- List of communities in New Brunswick
