= Katherine Ryan (Klondike Kate) =

Canadian restaurateur and frontierswoman

Katherine Ryan, aka Klondike Kate.

Katherine "Kate" Ryan, also called Klondike Kate, was the first white woman to arrive in the Yukon Territory in 1898, during the Yukon Gold Rush. During her time in the territory, she settled in Whitehorse and worked as a nurse while operating several restaurants, and in 1900 she became one of the first women hired by the North-West Mounted Police. Ryan was born in Johnville on August 20th, 1869 and died on February 20th, 1932 in Vancouver.

== Early Life ==
Ryan was born to Anne and Patrick Ryan in a small Irish community in Johnville, New Brunswick in 1869. She moved to Seattle and later began training as a nurse in 1894 at the Sisters of Nahomish Hospital. Two years later she left to work as a nurse in St. Paul’s Hospital in Vancouver, British Colombia.

== Gold Rush ==
When Ryan heard of the gold rush in the north she spent her life savings on equipment from the Hudson's Bay Company. She was one of the few women to make the journey on foot via the Stikine Trail, which was considered one of the most challenging routes to the area. She stopped in Glenora, B.C., where railways and roads from the town had not been built yet. There she spent a piece of gold worth 5$ to open a restaurant in a hotel. A year later, she sold the restaurant and opened another in Telegraph Creek.

In the spring of 1899, Ryan reached Whitehorse, which at the time was a tent city. She pitched her tent and opened another restaurant, which was later called "Klondike Kate’s Café." The restaurant became so successful that by the summer she had to hire help while she also worked as a laundress and a nurse. On February 5th, 1900, Ryan was hired at the Whitehorse detachment of the North-West Mounted Police (NWMP) to help manage female prisoners; she was one of the first woman hired by the NWMP and the first woman hired as a special constable. The same year, she had built a small one-room cabin (measuring 3.7 x 4.9 m). After the house burned down in 1905, Ryan built a two-storey house with a storefront on the ground floor. After 1903, her work with the NWMP to stop female train passengers trying to smuggle gold out of the territory.

Ryan co-founded the North Star Athletic Club, a social and sporting club in Whitehorse and worked for women's suffrage. In 1919 she moved to Stewart, B.C., where she opened the town's first hospital and served as its first matron. She was also involved organisations like in the Catholic Women’s League, the Red Cross, the Order of Yukon Pioneers and the Imperial Order of the Daughters of the Empire.

Ryan died on 20 February 1932 in St. Paul’s Hospital, where she had worked many years before. An RCMP honour guard attended her funeral.
