= Fredericton Public Library =

New Brunswick library

- 45.96261°N 66.63982°W
- Location: 12 Carleton Street; Fredericton, New Brunswick; E3B 5P4
- Type: Public Library
- Established: 1955
- Branches: 2

Collection
- Items collected: Books, journals, magazines, newspapers, sound recordings, databases, maps, drawings
- Size: Over 150 000 books, magazines, newspapers, documents, CDs, and DVDs.

Other information
- Director: Julia Stewart
- Website: Fredericton Public Library page

The Fredericton Public Library is a public library located in Fredericton, New Brunswick, Canada; it is the province's most used public library, with over 700 visitors each day. Established in 1955, the current building, designed by Architect Keith L. Graham, was built in June 1975 and remodelled and expanded in 1990. Another extensive renovation took place in 2013 and 2014 which increased the size of all departments and collections. The library holds books, large print books, current magazines and newspapers, compact disks, and DVDs. Microforms of local newspapers such as The Daily Gleaner and The Telegraph Journal are available. In addition, the library contains a restricted provincial archives collection, technology, and children's department.
