= Johnville, New Brunswick =

Coordinates: 46°33′57.2″N 67°33′19.9″W

Location of Johnville in New Brunswick

Johnville is a community in the Canadian province of New Brunswick. It is situated in Kent, a parish of Carleton County.

== History ==
In the mid-19th century, New Brunswick's Catholic Bishop, John Sweeney, lobbied the colonial government for land for Irish emigrants. In the early-to-mid 1860s, people began to move to the land granted to Johnville. (Maps indicate that some of the land in the area had been allocated to individuals prior to the establishment of the settlement.) Some residents came from Saint John, while others moved directly from Ireland. For some people, it was their first foray into farming. The Bishop, and successive Priests, worked alongside settlers to clear land, plant crops, and build dwellings. The Hall family built the first frame house, which was used as the church and rectory until the community erected these structures between 1867 and 1884.

== Notable people ==
- Katherine Ryan (Klondike Kate), restaurateur, nurse, and police officer, famous in the Klondike Gold Rush

== See also ==
- List of communities in New Brunswick
