= Kindness Club =

Humane education organization

The Kindness Club is a humane education organization. It was founded by Aida Flemming in Fredericton, New Brunswick, in 1959.

== Origin and growth ==
In 1957 Aida Flemming, the wife of New Brunswick premier Hugh John Flemming, sponsored a children's essay contest in Carleton County, New Brunswick on the topic: "What is being done now for the protection of animals and what more could be done?" Encouraged by the response, she launched the Kindness Club in 1959 with an article in the magazine Atlantic Advocate proposing a club for children between the ages of 5 and 13. The organization was based on the principle of reverence for life, the ethical concept developed by Albert Schweitzer, and when the club grew into an international organization Schweitzer accepted Flemming's invitation to act as its honorary president. By 1962 branches had been established in the United States, New Zealand and England. Members pledged "to be kind to animals (as well as people) and to speak and act in defense of all helpless creatures". An early member of the Kindness Club was the environmental activist Paul Watson, who has credited the club with teaching him to "respect and defend animals".

The Humane Society of the United States took on the responsibility for clubs in the United States while the World Federation for the Protection of Animals in Switzerland oversaw the other international chapters. By 1984, the club's 25th anniversary year, it had chapters in 22 countries.

== In the 21st century ==
In 2009, the Kindness Club's 50th anniversary year, most of its members were in Canada. Continuing to base itself on Schweitzer's reverence for life philosophy, the club promotes humane education for children and contributes to local initiatives including subsidized spay/neuter programs and donations of pet food to food banks.

The Kindness Club in Canada is administered by the Kindness Club Foundation Inc., which was incorporated in New Brunswick in 1963. The foundation is a registered charity whose mandate in 2016 was "supporting charitable organizations carrying out humane education."
