= Hugh John Flemming =

New Brunswick Canada politician (1899–1982)

The Honourable Hugh John Flemming PC
- Official 1968 portrait

Member of the Canadian Parliament for Carleton-Charlotte
- In office June 25, 1968 – October 30, 1972
- Preceded by: Riding established
- Succeeded by: Fred McCain

Member of the Canadian Parliament for Victoria-Carleton
- In office June 18, 1962 – June 25, 1968
- Preceded by: Gage Montgomery
- Succeeded by: Riding abolished

Member of the Canadian Parliament for Royal
- In office October 31, 1960 – June 18, 1962
- Preceded by: Alfred J. Brooks
- Succeeded by: Gordon Fairweather

MLA for Carleton
- In office August 28, 1944 – October 31, 1960 Serving with Fred C. Squires, Gladstone W. Perry, Jack Fraser, Fred McCain, Harrison Monteith, A. Edison Stairs
- Preceded by: Edwin W. Melville
- Succeeded by: Richard Hatfield

24th Premier of New Brunswick
- In office October 8, 1952 – July 11, 1960
- Monarch: Elizabeth II
- Lieutenant Governor: David L. MacLaren; Joseph Leonard O'Brien
- Preceded by: John B. McNair
- Succeeded by: Louis Robichaud

Personal details
- Born: January 5, 1899 Peel, New Brunswick, Canada
- Died: October 16, 1982 (aged 83) Fredericton, New Brunswick, Canada
- Resting place: Methodist Church Cemetery
- Party: Progressive Conservative
- Spouse: Aida McAnn (m. 1946)

Hugh John Flemming PC (January 5, 1899 – October 16, 1982) was a politician and the 24th premier of New Brunswick from 1952 to 1960.

He is always known as "Hugh John". Born in Peel, New Brunswick, Canada, the son of James Kidd Flemming, Premier of New Brunswick from 1911 to 1914, Hugh John Flemming was first elected to the province's Legislative Assembly in 1944 after more than twenty years as a municipal councillor. In 1951 he became leader of the Progressive Conservative Party of New Brunswick leading the party to victory on 22 September 1952. Flemming would then lead the 42nd New Brunswick Legislature, which ran from 11 February 1952 to 17 April 1956. He and his party were re-elected to govern the 43rd New Brunswick Legislature.

As Premier during two terms, Flemming modernized the province's hydro system, built the Beechwood Dam, then the largest hydro-electric project in the province, and presented a balanced budget every year in office.

Universal health care, which had been proposed formally by the St. Laurent government at the 1955 federal-provincial summit on taxation, would become his nemesis because of his reluctance to sink the budget of the province.

In 1960 his government was defeated because of the hospital tax, which had been set by his government at $50 per capita and which the Liberals promised to abolish while maintaining a balanced budget, and the Liberal promises to reform alcohol sales, and to revive the moose hunt.

Following the defeat of his provincial government, he was named Minister of Forestry in the cabinet of Prime Minister John Diefenbaker. He sought a seat in a by-election in southern New Brunswick in 1960 and was re-elected to his home district four times before he retired from the House of Commons of Canada in 1972. He became Minister of National Revenue in 1962, but in 1963 the then-minority government was defeated by the 25th Canadian Parliament, and he would spend his remaining years in Parliament on the opposition benches. Flemming died in Fredericton, New Brunswick.

== Legacy ==
Flemming's son, Hugh John Flemming, Jr. ran for a seat in the New Brunswick Legislature in 1974 but lost to Shirley Dysart by 73 votes. His grandson Ted Flemming was elected to the provincial legislature in the 2012 Rothesay by-election and served as New Brunswick's minister of health from 2012 to 2014.

Flemming's family-run lumber mill in the village of Juniper, New Brunswick ran into financial difficulties in the late 1970s, but his friend Harrison McCain, organized an investment campaign that raised sufficient capital from businessmen to allow the mill to make a financial recovery. The mill was sold and dismantled c 2010 and the area has been re-purposed to store production of the peat moss facility. His wife Aida was the founder of the Kindness Club, an organization to facilitate kindness toward animals geared towards children.

The Hugh John Flemming Forestry Centre in Fredericton is home to the Maritime College of Forest Technology as well as several branches of the governments of New Brunswick and Canada, and the K.C. Irving Theatre.

Flemming and his wife Aida are buried in the Methodist Church Cemetery in Woodstock, New Brunswick.

== Electoral history ==
By-election on 31 October 1960
Party	Candidate	Votes	%	±%
Progressive Conservative	Hugh John Flemming	8,755	51.91	-7.94
Liberal	Harold Fredericks	7,731	45.84	+5.69
Co-operative Commonwealth	George Henry Wheaton	379	2.25	
Total valid votes		16,865	100.00	

18th Canadian Ministry (1957–1963) – Cabinet of John Diefenbaker
Cabinet posts (2)
Predecessor	Office	Successor
George Nowlan	Minister of National Revenue; 1962–1963	Jack Garland
New portfolio	Minister of Forestry; 1960–1963	Martial Asselin
