= Hartland Covered Bridge =

Covered bridge in New Brunswick, Canada

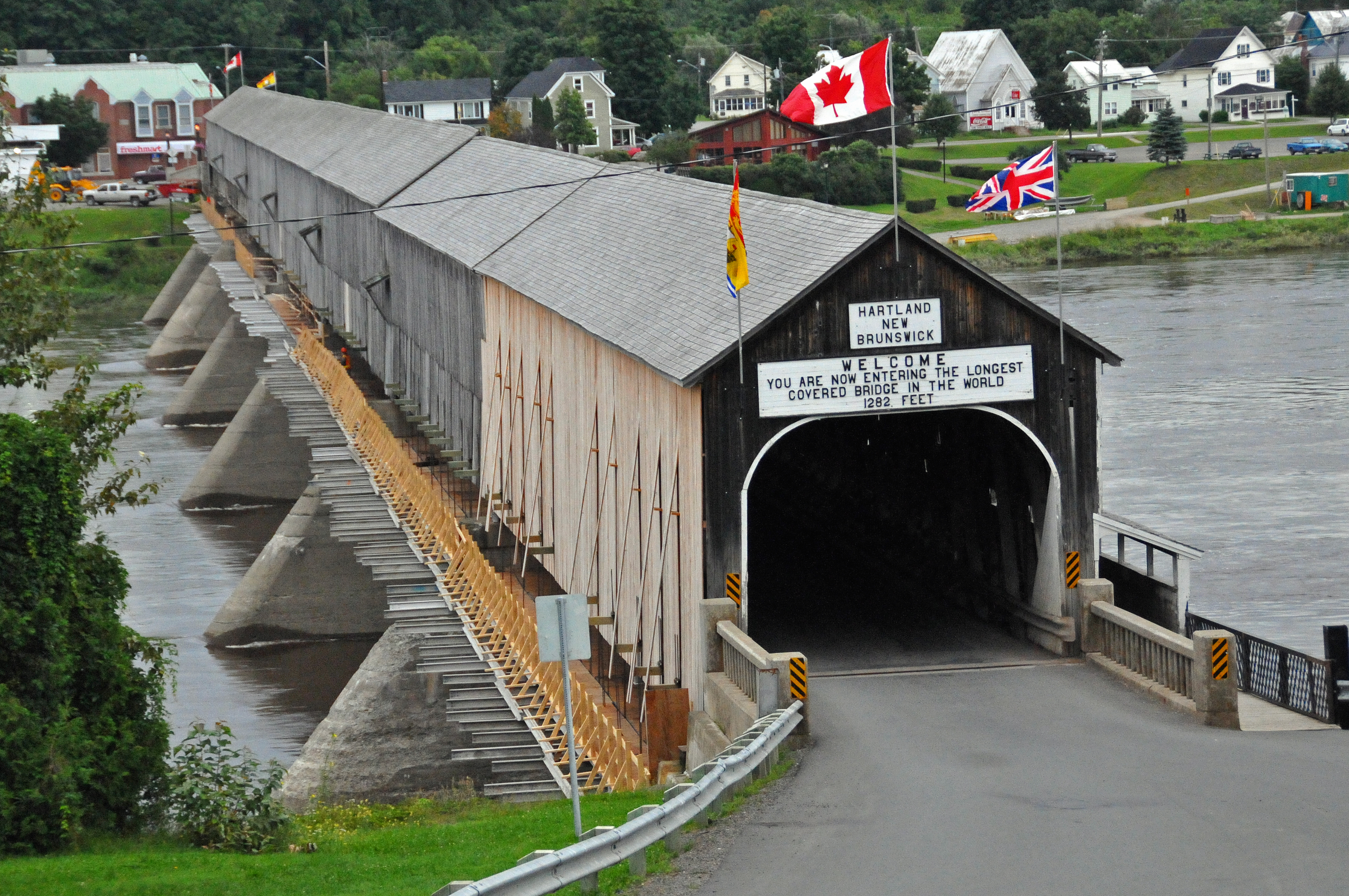
- Hartland Covered Bridge, from the Somerville side looking back toward Hartland.
- Coordinates: 46°17′48″N 67°31′49″W
- Carries: Hartland Bridge Hill Road
- Crosses: Saint John River
- Locale: Hartland-Somerville, New Brunswick, Canada

Characteristics
- Design: Howe truss covered bridge
- Material: Concrete (piers) wood (truss)
- Total length: 1,282 feet (391 m)
- No. of spans: 7
- Piers in water: 5
- Load limit: 10 tonnes (regularly); 3 tonnes (since December 2023)

History
- Construction start: December 1899
- Construction end: June 1901
- Construction cost: $33,000
- Opened: May 14, 1901
- Inaugurated: July 4, 1901
- Replaces: Hartland ferry, Ice bridge

National Historic Site of Canada
- Official name: Hartland Covered Bridge National Historic Site of Canada
- Designated: November 17, 1977

New Brunswick Heritage Conservation Act
- Type: Provincial Heritage Place
- Designated: September 15, 1999

Location
- Interactive map of Hartland Covered Bridge

The Hartland Covered Bridge (French: Pont couvert de Hartland) or Hartland Bridge is the world's longest covered bridge at 1,282 feet (391 m) in length. Located in New Brunswick, Canada, the bridge crosses the Saint John River, joining the Carleton County communities of Hartland and Somerville. The framework consists of seven small Howe Truss bridges joined on six piers. The bridge was designated a National Historic Site of Canada in 1977, and a Provincial Heritage Place in New Brunswick under the Heritage Conservation Act in 1999.

The Hartland Bridge originally opened in 1901 after planning and construction work dating back to around 1898, though its construction had been proposed and discussed earlier. It was initially uncovered and a toll bridge. The Hartland Covered Bridge became covered after it was rebuilt when it became structurally damaged by weather in early 1920. Today, it is used primarily as a tourist attraction, featuring only one lane as well as load and height limits.

== Overview ==
The Hartland Covered Bridge is located on the 0.303 km (0.188 mi) long Hartland Bridge Hill Road. It crosses the Saint John River, connecting the Carleton County towns Hartland and Somerville. Formerly part of the Trans-Canada Highway, the bridge connects New Brunswick Route 103 (Somerville side) to New Brunswick Route 105 (Hartland side). As the world's longest covered bridge, it is often visited by tourists. It only contains one lane.

== History ==
=== Background ===
Historically, the Saint John River was crossed in the area ferry. The need for a bridge in Hartland became a political issue in the late 19th century. In 1896, Legislative Assembly of New Brunswick member Allan Dibblee advocated for its construction, threatening to oppose the government if a grant was not received. At that time, the government allocated $400,000 (equivalent to $19,611,824 in 2025) for constructing new bridges. Proposals for a Hartland bridge began as early as 1895. A letter to the Hartland Advertiser in December 1897 highlighted the importance a bridge would have for residents "within a radius of five or six miles" from Hartland.

=== Construction ===
Initial planning for the bridge began in 1898. As a result of the issue, efforts to incorporate the Hartland Bridge Company were made in early 1899. On October 9, 1899, the Hartland Bridge Company submitted construction plans with the Minister of Public Works. A public notice calling for contractor tenders was issued by The Royal Gazette on October 25, 1899, with a deadline of November 20. The Dispatch featured a story from the Hartland Advertiser on November 15, providing an update on bridge development, indicating that the Hartland Bridge Company has begun purchasing land for the site(s) of the bridge pier. By December 13, 1899, the tender was awarded to Albert Brewer for $27,945, the lowest bid. The bridge's construction was expected to completed within one year. Construction materials were being shipped by February 1900, and the bridge was to have seven piers and two abutments. By April 1900, three piers were built, with an estimated completion "by next November."

In March 1901, the Hartland Advertiser reported the bridge was "now completed as far as the actual construction is concerned," with the flooring still to be added before it could open to the public. Charles McCormac, president of the Hartland Bridge Company, sought discussions with the government about implementing bridge tolls, proposing costs of "3c for foot passengers, 6c for single teams, and 12c for double teams." By late April 1901, progress on the bridge was described as "all floored but the span on the west end." The bridge was opened on May 14, 1901. On June 12, 1901, The Daily Gleaner reported that construction was nearly finished, with a formal opening planned to be held "sometime during July."

=== Completion and early use ===
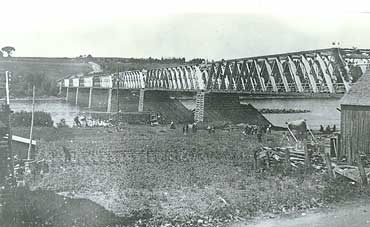
Hartland Bridge when it opened on July 4, 1901.

On May 13, 1901, A. W. Estey, a doctor from Hartland, became the first person to cross the Hartland Bridge one day before its official opening; he received an emergency call when workers were finalizing construction. Following its completion and use before the official opening, the bridge generated around $8 to $12 daily in toll revenue, deemed "very satisfactory". The opening ceremony was scheduled for July 4, 1901, with invitations announced shortly beforehand. Prominent individuals, including government members, attended the ceremony, which drew "nearly 4,000 people from surrounding villages and the countryside". Provincial government members present included Premier Lemuel John Tweedie, Stephen Burpee Appleby, Harrison A. McKeown, and Charles H. LaBillois. The bridge was not originally built covered.

The Hartland Bridge utilized a toll system, which saw opposition voiced as early as February 1902, during which a petition for its abolition was held. On October 10, 1902, a local delegation requested the government to take over ownership and make the bridge free. The provincial government purchased the bridge for $5,461.71 that year, and the toll system was removed on May 1, 1906, following an earlier announcement. On July 15, 1907, a fire broke out near the bridge, causing over $130,000 in damages to nearby businesses. The bridge and its toll house had "narrow[ly] escape[d] from destruction." The fire was quickly suspected to have been started with an incendiary device. A man was arrested and charged five days afterwards, but was later released before trial due to insufficient evidence. In March 1909, a local news item on The Daily Gleaner reported that a contract for supplying materials for re-flooring the bridge had been awarded.

=== Restoration and modern use ===
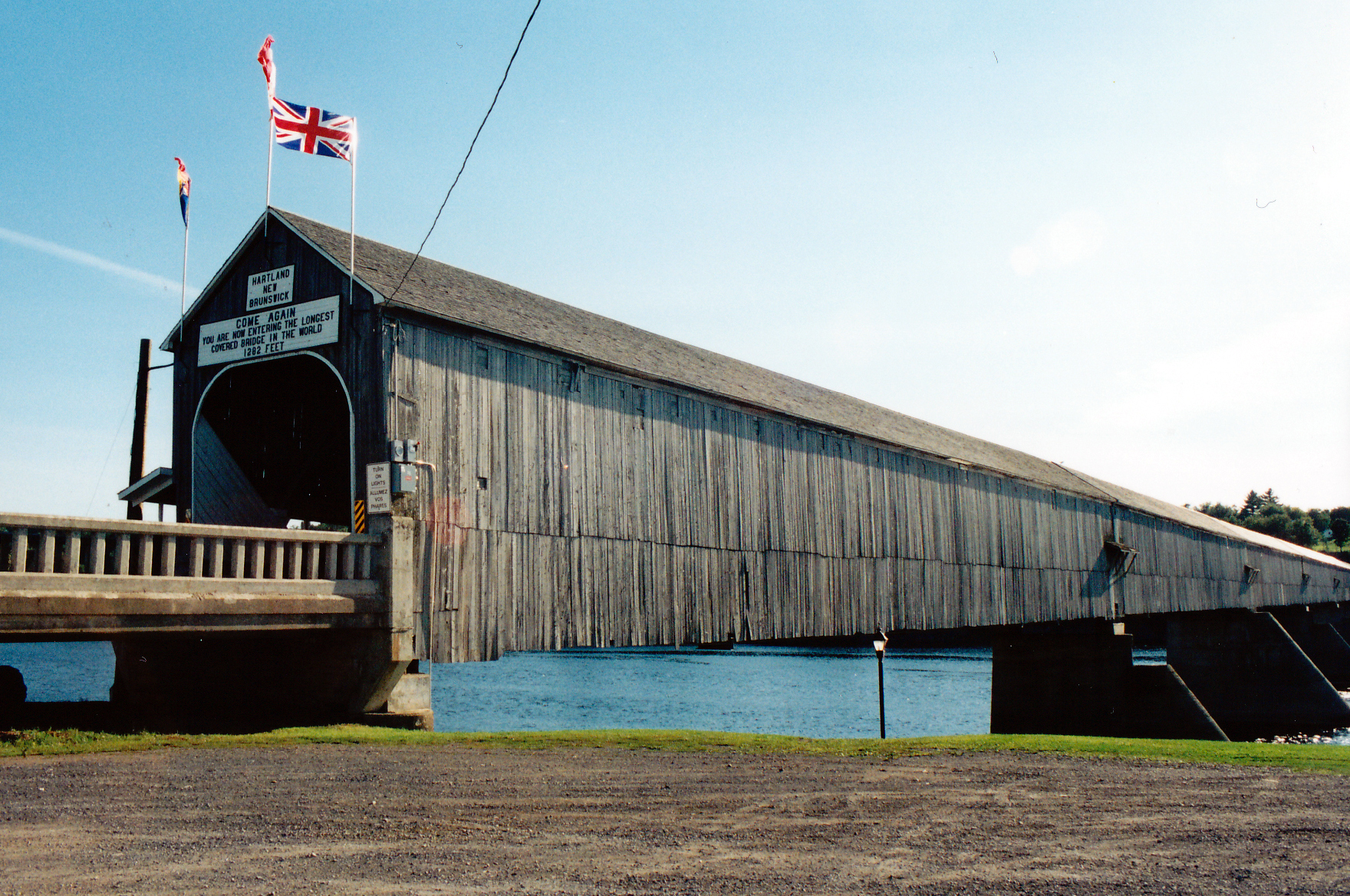
Hartland Covered Bridge, pictured from the Hartland side

By the late 1910s, the bridge's deteriorating condition had become a political issue. There were calls to address its maintenance and replace it with a steel structure. Preparations for repairs began in November 1919. By early January 1920, construction work was underway, and traffic was closed due to an ice bridge. On April 6, 1920, heavy rainfall caused a freshet as well as ice to damage the west side of the bridge, resulting in two spans collapsing. In response to the damage, there was a controversial proposal to convert the Hartland Bridge into a covered bridge. Benjamin Franklin Smith, a legislative member representing Carleton, opposed the idea, with The Daily Gleaner summarizing his opinion of it as being "considerable of a menace".

In late April 1920, the legislature passed an act guaranteeing the reconstruction of the bridge. Reconstruction of the piers began around August 1920, with an estimate to hire "upwards of 100 men". Repairs were completed by the following year, and the bridge reopened to traffic on March 7, 1921. A roof was added to the bridge that same year. Starting in April 1925, repairs were made to the bridge's floor to address noise complaints.

The Hartland Covered Bridge, like many other covered bridges in New Brunswick, has suffered damage from weather, vandalism, and vehicle accidents. In 1970, heavy trucks were barred from crossing the bridge. The bridge was designated a National Historic Site on November 17, 1977, and a Provincial Historic Site under the Heritage Conservation Act on September 15, 1999. In 2006, Hartland contributed a wooden piece of the bridge to the Six String Nation project's Voyageur guitar. For its 111th anniversary on July 4, 2012, the bridge was celebrated with a Google Doodle on Google's Canadian homepage.

In October 2023, a structural survey found a "downward bend," leading to the bridge's closure for repairs. When it reopened in late December 2023, the Department of Transportation and Infrastructure announced a load limit reduction from ten tonnes to three tonnes "until further notice".

== Bridge dimensions ==
Dashcam footage of an individual driving through the Hartland Covered Bridge

The Hartland Covered Bridge is the longest covered bridge in the world. Parks Canada lists the bridge's span as 390.75 metres, or approximately 1,282 feet. Guinness World Records rounds this up to 391 metres, "from one bank to the other." Of its seven spans, five are 51 metres (167 ft), and two are 43.9 metres (144 ft). It is also the longest covered bridge ever constructed in Canada, the second-longest being a 377-metre-long (1,237 ft) bridge on the Batiscan river in Quebec, used between 1844 and 1870. It is not the longest covered bridge that has ever been built; some longer bridges were built earlier in the 19th century, including the earliest renditions of the Columbia–Wrightsville Bridge in Pennsylvania, though such bridges have since ceased to exist.

The bridge has one lane. It has a usual load limit of ten tonnes, which has since been reduced to three tonnes after being re-opened in December 2023 following maintenance work. Heavier vehicles must detour using the nearby Hugh John Flemming Bridge. A small covered walkway, in place since the mid-1940s, is attached to the side of the bridge and allows pedestrian access.

== See also ==
- Covered Bridge (company)
- List of bridges in Canada
- List of crossings of the Saint John River
- Structure gauge
