= New Brunswick Bible Institute =

Coordinates: 46.27332°N 67.51018°W

- Motto: "God's Purpose - Our Passion"
- Type: Private Bible College
- Established: 1944
- Founder: Rev. John Parschauer
- President: Matthew Little
- Faculty: 11
- Administrative staff: 15
- Students: 60 (Fall 2025)
- Location: Victoria Corner, New Brunswick, Canada
- Campus: Rural
- Language: English
- Website: nbbi.ca

New Brunswick Bible Institute (NBBI), is a conservative, evangelical Bible college located in Victoria Corner, New Brunswick, Canada. It is governed by a board of directors, and its mission is to provide training in thorough and practical knowledge of the Bible.

== History ==
The New Brunswick Bible Institute was founded in the fall of 1944 by Rev. John Parschauer and a group of fellow Christian men who saw the need for a Bible-centred school where young men and women could receive training and be sent forth to evangelize. The school’s very first board was that of the Canadian Sunday School Mission, and acquired land and buildings through fundraising and significant financial contributions made by William McGee. The school’s first enrolment consisted of ten students. Parschauer left the NBBI after ten years and went on to found another Bible college, Bibelschule Brake in Lemgo, Germany.

In 1947, the NBBI was recognized by an act of the Legislative Assembly of New Brunswick, and saw increased enrolment and expansion in the decades that followed.As of 2025, the NBBI has an enrolment of 60 students and a 100 acre campus with 22 buildings. Its main building (Kenneth M. Robins Study Centre) includes classrooms, administration offices, a library, bookstore, lounge, dining hall, weight room, and gymnasium. Both the men’s (Beacon Hall) and women’s (Liberty Hall) dorms are located on campus. The women’s dorm is Liberty Hall, while the men’s is Beacon Hall.

== Academics ==
As of 2025, the NBBI offers a one-year Associate Diploma of Biblical and Theological Studies program, a three-year Diploma of Biblical and Theological Studies program, and four-year Bachelor of Biblical Studies and Bachelor of Religious Education programs (both of which also award a Diploma of Advanced Biblical Ministries). The NBBI previously partnered with Covington Theological Seminary in Fort Oglethorpe, Georgia to award its Bachelor of Theology degrees, however ended this partnership in 2023.
