= Hartland, New Brunswick =

Hartland
- Town
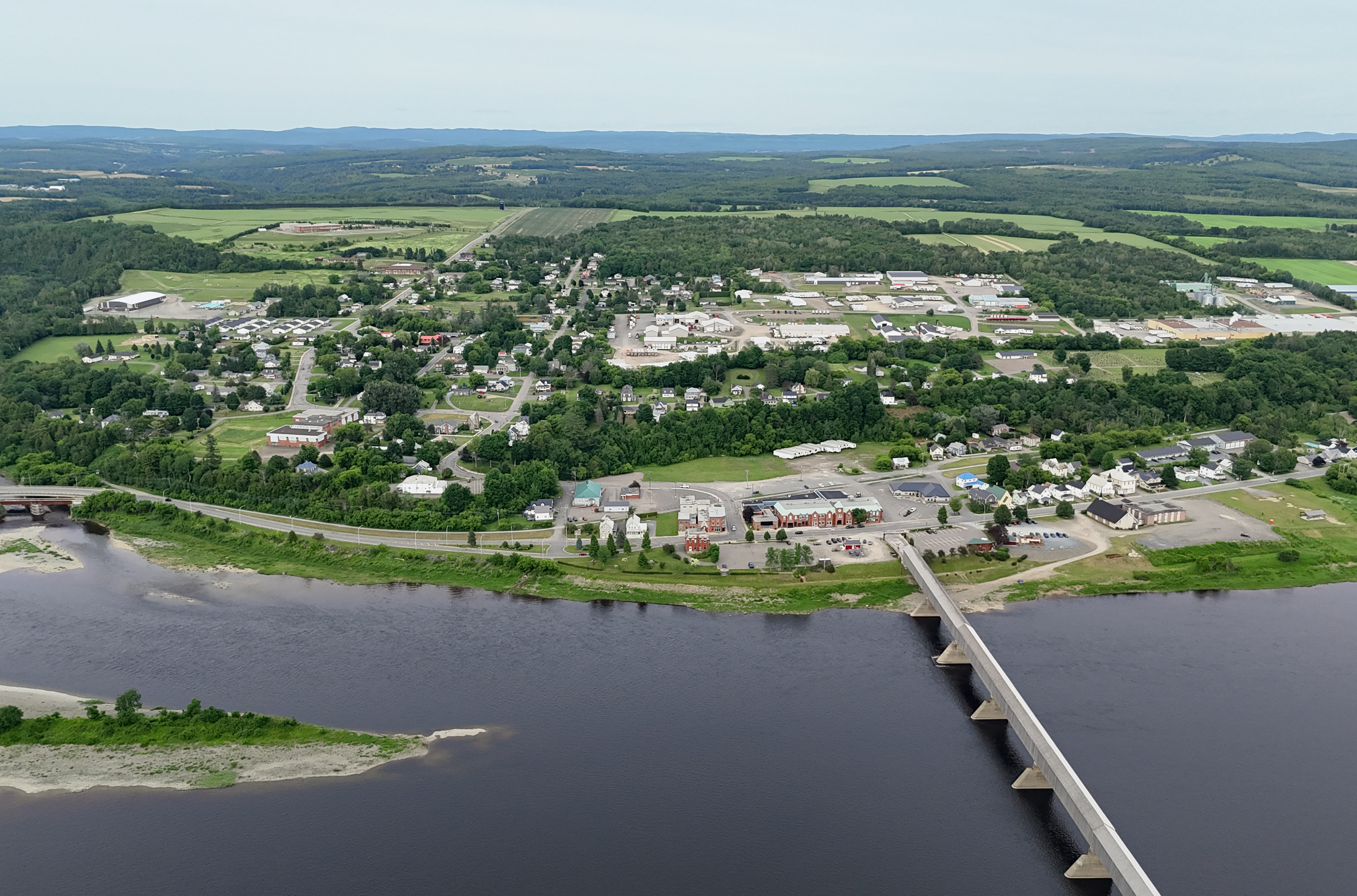
- Downtown Hartland

- Seal
- Nickname: Home of the World's Longest Covered Bridge
- Location within New Brunswick
- Coordinates: 46.29742°N 67.52742°W
- Country: Canada
- Provinces of Canada: New Brunswick
- County: Carleton County
- Founded: 1813
- Incorporated: October 2, 1918

Government
  - Type: Town Council
  - Mayor: Tracey DeMerchant

Area
  - Land: 9.50 km^{2} (3.67 sq mi)
- Elevation: 41 to 103 m (135 to 338 ft)

Population (2021)
  - Total: 933
  - Density: 98.2/km^{2} (254/sq mi)
  - Change (2016–21): ▼2.5%
- Time zone: UTC-4 (AST)
  - Summer (DST): UTC-3 (ADT)
- Canadian Postal code: E7P
- Area code: 506
- Telephone Exchange: 375
- NTS Map: 21J5 Florenceville
- GNBC Code: DAJRT
- Website: http://www.townofhartland.ca

Hartland is a town in Carleton County, New Brunswick, Canada.

On 1 January 2023, Hartland annexed all or part of seven local service districts, greatly expanding its area and population. The annexed communities' names remain in official use. Revised census figures have not been released.

== Geography ==
Hartland is situated on the Saint John River in the central-western portion of the province in the agricultural heartland of Carleton County.

== History ==
The first settler in the area of what would become Hartland was William Orser (b.1762) and his son William Jr. William traveled there from New York with his wife and six children. His wife died of an illness and he remarried to a widow, Mary Blake, who also had six children. The pair later conceived an additional six children. The land was settled in 1797, and granted in 1809.

The town was named Hartland in 1874, to honour James R. Hartley, a surveyor and MLA.

It is the hometown of two of New Brunswick's premiers during the 20th century: Hugh John Flemming and Richard Hatfield. U.S. Congressmen Isaac & Samuel Stephenson and Prince Edward Island's Lieutenant-Governor Barbara Oliver Hagerman are also from Hartland. Renowned Canadian poet Alden Nowlan also lived in the town for several formative years while working for the Hartland Observer newspaper.

The town is best known for being the site of the Hartland Bridge, the longest covered bridge in the world. Originally opened on July 4, 1901, the 1,282 foot (390.75 m) bridge is a national historic site. The bridge was covered as part of major repairs in 1921, and the pedestrian walkway added in 1945.

Prior to the building of the Mactaquac Dam, Hartland was also famous for its salmon pools, located slightly upstream of the Hartland Bridge.

Hartland is the headquarters of the North American trucking company Day & Ross, itself a subsidiary of McCain Foods, as well as home to the New Brunswick Bible Institute.

== Demographics ==
In the 2021 Census of Population conducted by Statistics Canada, Hartland had a population of 933 living in 374 of its 390 total private dwellings, a change of −2.5% from its 2016 population of 957. With a land area of 9.5 km^{2} (3.7 sq mi), it had a population density of 98.2/km^{2} (254.4/sq mi) in 2021.

== Disasters ==
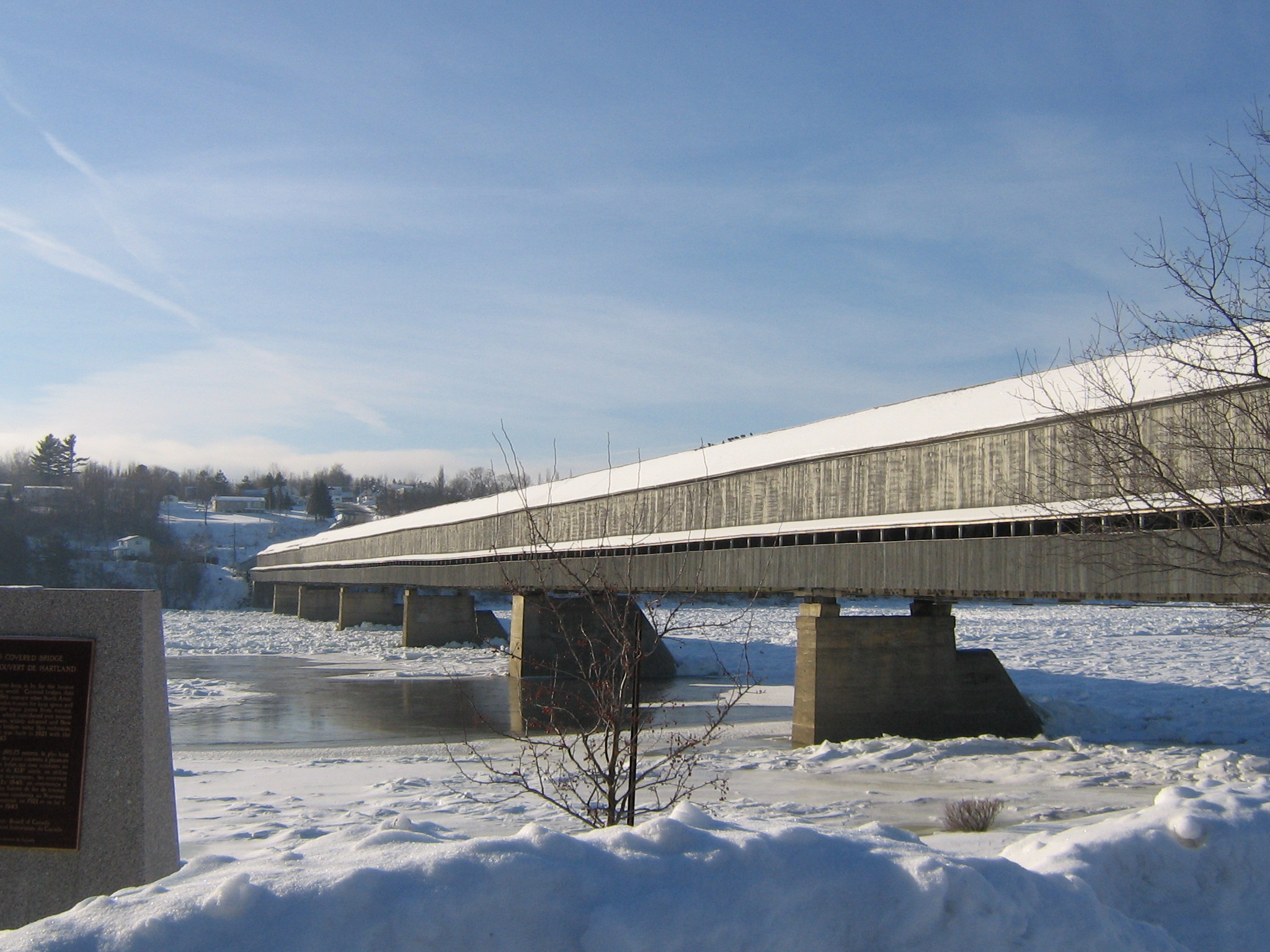
Longest covered bridge, showing pedestrian addition, with ice in the river

=== Fires ===
July 15, 1907

An arsonist started a fire which consumed a large part of the town. The town was rebuilt.

October 24, 1946

The town's dehydration plant, used to dehydrate potatoes, was destroyed by fire. The adjacent glucose and starch plants were also consumed.

August 25, 1980

A fire destroyed many businesses on Main Street.

=== Floods ===
Being built close to the Saint John River, the town is usually affected by the annual spring freshet. Ice jams threaten the Hartland Bridge, it being a choke point for loose ice.

== See also ==
- List of communities in New Brunswick
