= 22nd New Brunswick Legislature =

19th-century New Brunswick legislative assembly

The 22nd New Brunswick Legislative Assembly represented New Brunswick between February 16, 1871, and May 15, 1874.

Lemuel Allan Wilmot served as Lieutenant-Governor of New Brunswick until November 1873, when he was replaced by Samuel Leonard Tilley.

E.A. Vail was chosen as speaker.

The Liberal-Conservatives led by George E. King formed the government. George L. Hathaway took over the leadership of the party in February 1871. George E. King became leader again in 1872 after Hathaway's death.

In May 1871, the Common Schools Act was passed; it came into effect the following year. This legislation implemented a system of publicly funded schools. However, it excluded denominational schools; religious instruction in schools operated under the system was banned. The act offended Roman Catholics and Acadians in the province.

== Members ==
Electoral District	Name	Party	First elected / previously elected
Albert	Rufus Palmer (Note: died in 1873)	Liberal	1870
Albert	James Ryan	Independent	1870
Albert	Martin B. Palmer (1873)	Liberal	1873
Carleton	William Lindsay	Liberal	1861
Carleton	George W. White (Note: resigned)	Conservative	1868
Carleton	David Irvine (1873)	Liberal	1873
Charlotte	Benjamin Robert Stephenson	Liberal	1867
Charlotte	Francis Hibbard	Independent	1866
Charlotte	Joseph Donald	Independent	1870
Charlotte	J. McAdam (Note: elected to federal seat)	Conservative	1854, 1864, 1866
Charlotte	John Cameron Brown (1872)	Liberal	1872
Gloucester	Samuel H. Napier	Independent	1870
Gloucester	Théotime Blanchard	Conservative	1870
Kent	William Shand Caie	Independent	1865
Kent	Antoine Girouard	Conservative	1870
Kent	Henry O'Leary (1873)	Independent	1873
Kings	E.A. Vail	Independent	1857, 1870
Kings	George Otty (Note: resigned seat after being named a judge)	Independent	1865, 1870
Kings	John Herbert Crawford	Liberal	1870
Kings	J.W. Nowlan (1873)	Liberal	1873
Northumberland	William Moore Kelly	Independent	1867
Northumberland	Jacob C. Gough	Independent	1867
Northumberland	Michael Adams	Conservative	1870
Northumberland	Thomas F. Gillespie	Conservative	1870
Queens	R.T Babbit	Independent	1866
Queens	Gideon D. Bailey	Independent	1870
Queens	Ebenezer Williams (1871)	Independent	1871
Queens	Walter S. Butler (1872)	Independent	1867, 1872
Restigouche	William Montgomery	Independent	1867
Restigouche	Alexander C. DesBrisay	Liberal	1865
Restigouche	John Phillips (1870)	Liberal	1870
Saint John City	Aaron Alward	Independent	1870
Saint John City	William Wedderburn	Independent	1870
Saint John County	George E. King	Conservative	1867
Saint John County	Edward Willis	Independent	1870
Saint John County	Michael Whalen Maher	Independent	1870
Saint John County	Joseph Coram	Independent	1865, 1867
Sunbury	Archibald Harrison	Liberal	1870
Sunbury	John S. Covert	Liberal	1868
Victoria	Lévite Thériault	Liberal	1868
Victoria	James Tibbits	Independent	1854, 1870
Westmorland	P.A. Landry	Conservative	1870
Westmorland	Angus McQueen	Independent	1866
Westmorland	Bliss Botsford	Independent	1850, 1856, 1865
Westmorland	Joseph Lytle Moore (Note: died in 1871)	Independent	1867
Westmorland	Daniel Lionel Hanington (1870)	Conservative	1870
Westmorland	John A. Humphrey (1872)	Conservative	1872
York	Robert Robinson	Independent	1870
York	G.L. Hatheway (Note: died in 1872)	Conservative	1850, 1861, 1870
York	John A. Beckwith	Conservative	1866
York	Charles McPherson	Independent	1854, 1870
York	John James Fraser (1872)	Conservative	1865, 1872

== Notes ==
Preceded by 21st New Brunswick Legislature	Legislative Assemblies of New Brunswick; 1870–1874	Succeeded by 23rd New Brunswick Legislature
