= Albert (provincial electoral district, 1846–1973) =

Defunct provincial electoral district in New Brunswick, Canada

New Brunswick electoral district

Defunct provincial electoral district
- Legislature: Legislative Assembly of New Brunswick
- District created: 1846
- District abolished: 1973
- First contested: 1847
- Last contested: 1970

Albert was a provincial electoral district for the Legislative Assembly of New Brunswick, Canada. It was created in 1846 when Albert County was created and its boundaries were the same as the county. It returned two members until 1973 when New Brunswick moved to single member districts, and this riding was split into the current riding of Albert and the new riding of Riverview.

== Members of the Legislative Assembly ==
Legislature	Years	Member	Party	Member	Party
Riding created from Westmorland
14th	1847 – 1850	William Steeves	Independent	John Smith	Independent
15th	1850 – 1854	William Steeves	Independent	Robert Stiles	Independent
16th	1854 – 1856	Edward Stevens	Independent	Abner R. McClelan	Independent
17th	1856 – 1857	John Lewis	Independent	Abner R. McClelan	Independent
18th	1857 – 1861	John Lewis	Independent	Abner R. McClelan	Independent
19th	1861 – 1865	Reuben Stiles	Independent	Abner R. McClelan	Independent
20th	1865 – 1866	John Lewis	Independent	Abner R. McClelan	Independent
21st	1866 – 1867	John Lewis	Independent	Abner R. McClelan	Independent
21st	1867 – 1870	Amos Atkinson Bliss	Independent	Abner R. McClelan	Independent
22nd	1870 – 1873	Rufus Palmer	Independent	James Ryan	Liberal
22nd	1873 – 1874	Martin B. Palmer	Independent	James Ryan	Liberal
23rd	1874 – 1878	Alexander Rogers	Liberal	James Ryan	Liberal
24th	1879 – 1882	W.J. Lewis	Independent	Gaius S. Turner	Liberal-Conservative
25th	1883 – 1886	W.J. Lewis	Independent	Gaius S. Turner	Liberal-Conservative
26th	1886 – 1888	W.J. Lewis	Independent	Gaius S. Turner	Liberal-Conservative
26th	1888 – 1890	H.R. Emmerson	Independent	Gaius S. Turner	Liberal-Conservative
27th	1890 – 1892	W.J. Lewis	Independent	Gaius S. Turner	Liberal-Conservative
28th	1892 – 1895	W.J. Lewis	Independent	H.R. Emmerson	Independent
29th	1896 – 1897	W.J. Lewis	Independent	H.R. Emmerson	Independent
29th	1897 – 1899	Charles J. Osman	Liberal	H.R. Emmerson	Independent
30th	1899 – 1900	Charles J. Osman	Liberal	H.R. Emmerson	Independent
30th	1900 – 1903	Charles J. Osman	Liberal	Sanford S. Ryan	Independent
31st	1903 – 1908	Charles J. Osman	Liberal	Sanford S. Ryan	Independent
32nd	1908 – 1912	Walter B. Dickson	Independent	George D. Prescott	Independent
33rd	1912 – 1917	Walter B. Dickson	Independent	George D. Prescott	Independent
34th	1917 – 1920	Lewis Smith	Conservative	John L. Peck	Conservative
35th	1921 – 1925	Lewis Smith	Conservative	John L. Peck	Conservative
36th	1925 – 1927	Lewis Smith	Conservative	John L. Peck	Conservative
36th	1927 – 1930	Lewis Smith	Conservative	Conrad J. Osman	Conservative
37th	1931 – 1935	Frederick Colpitts	Liberal	Harry O. Downey	Liberal
38th	1935 – 1939	Frederick Colpitts	Liberal	Harry O. Downey	Liberal
39th	1939 – 1944	A. Russell Colpitts	Liberal	Harry O. Downey	Liberal
40th	1944 – 1948	A. Russell Colpitts	Liberal	Harry O. Downey	Liberal
41st	1948 – 1952	A. Russell Colpitts	Liberal	Harry O. Downey	Liberal
42nd	1952 – 1956	Everett E. Newcombe	Progressive Conservative	Claude D. Taylor	Progressive Conservative
43rd	1956 – 1960	Everett E. Newcombe	Progressive Conservative	Claude D. Taylor	Progressive Conservative
44th	1960 – 1963	Everett E. Newcombe	Progressive Conservative	Claude D. Taylor	Progressive Conservative
45th	1963 – 1967	Everett E. Newcombe	Progressive Conservative	Claude D. Taylor	Progressive Conservative
46th	1967 – 1970	Brenda Robertson	Progressive Conservative	Claude D. Taylor	Progressive Conservative
47th	1970 – 1974	Brenda Robertson	Progressive Conservative	Malcolm MacLeod	Progressive Conservative
Riding dissolved into Albert (1973– ) and Riverview

== Election results ==
1970 New Brunswick general election
Party	Candidate	Votes	Elected
Progressive Conservative	Brenda Robertson	4,863	✓
Progressive Conservative	Malcolm MacLeod	4,799	✓
Liberal	Clyde Downey	2,072	
Liberal	Cyril Ingalls	2,039	

1967 New Brunswick general election
Party	Candidate	Votes	Elected
Progressive Conservative	Claude D. Taylor	3,669	✓
Progressive Conservative	Brenda Robertson	3,597	✓
Liberal	Stephen S. Steeves	2,532	
Liberal	Clyde A. Downey	2,495	

== See also ==
- List of New Brunswick provincial electoral districts
- Canadian provincial electoral districts
