= George Edwin King =

Premier of New Brunswick and Supreme Court Justice

The Honourable George Edwin King
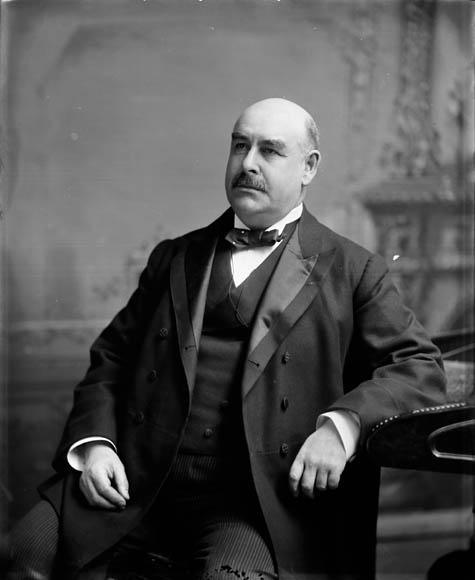
- King in 1895

2nd & 4th Premier of New Brunswick
- In office July 5, 1872 – May 3, 1878
- Monarch: Victoria
- Lieutenant Governor: Lemuel Allan Wilmot; Samuel Leonard Tilley
- Preceded by: George Luther Hathaway
- Succeeded by: John James Fraser
- In office June 9, 1870 – February 21, 1871
- Monarch: Victoria
- Lieutenant Governor: Lemuel Allan Wilmot
- Preceded by: Andrew Rainsford Wetmore
- Succeeded by: George Luther Hathaway

MLA for Saint John County
- In office October 15, 1867 – June 11, 1878 Serving with Charles Nelson Skinner, John Hamilton Gray, James Quinton, Edward Willis, Michael Whalen Maher, Henry A. Austin, Joseph Coram, William Elder
- Preceded by: Robert Duncan Wilmot
- Succeeded by: David McLellan

Puisne Justice of the Supreme Court of Canada
- In office September 21, 1893 – May 7, 1901
- Nominated by: John Sparrow David Thompson
- Preceded by: Christopher Salmon Patterson
- Succeeded by: Louis Henry Davies

Personal details
- Born: October 8, 1839 Saint John, New Brunswick
- Died: May 7, 1901 (aged 61) Ottawa, Ontario, Canada
- Party: Confederation Party
- Spouse: Lydia Eaton (m. 1866)
- Children: 1 son and 1 daughter
- Education: Wesleyan University
- Profession: Lawyer

George Edwin King (October 8, 1839 – May 7, 1901) was a Canadian lawyer, politician, second and fourth premier of New Brunswick, and puisne justice of the Supreme Court of Canada.

King was born in Saint John, New Brunswick and attended Wesleyan University in Middletown, Connecticut, where he received a B.A. in 1859 and a M.A. in 1862. He then served under articles to a senior lawyer in Saint John, Robert Leonard Hazen, was made an attorney in 1863, and was called to the bar in 1865.

King was elected to the first provincial legislature of the new Canadian Confederation in 1867 and served in the Confederation Party government as minister without portfolio. When Andrew R. Wetmore resigned, the Confederation Party became the Liberal-Conservatives and King became Premier in 1870. At 30 years of age, King was the youngest person to assume the premier's office in New Brunswick history. Some members of King's caucus felt he was too close to the federal Conservatives of Sir John A. Macdonald and King was maneuvered out of the leadership by George L. Hathaway with King taking a position in the new cabinet. When Hathaway died in 1872, King became Premier for a second time serving until 1878.

One of King's major accomplishments was the Common Schools Act of 1871 which implemented a single, tax supported public school system. As Attorney General, King appeared in the courts to defend the Act from constitutional challenges, including appearing before the Judicial Committee of the Privy Council, at that time the court of last resort for Canada within the British Empire, in the case of Maher v. Town Council of Portland, which upheld the Act.

In 1880 he became a justice of the province's supreme court, the Court of Queen's Bench of New Brunswick.

== Justice of the Supreme Court of Canada ==
On September 21, 1893, King was appointed by Prime Minister John Sparrow David Thompson to the Supreme Court of Canada to fill the vacancy created upon the death of Justice Christopher Salmon Patterson on July 24, 1893. King was described as "having the pugnacity and aggressiveness that made him a leader," and historian Ian Bushnell notes his appointment may have been to have a countervailing force to Chief Justice Samuel Henry Strong.

King had a specialty in commercial and criminal law, and was described by Chief Justice Strong as "probably the best commercial lawyer in the Dominion". The replacement of an Ontario justice Patterson, with a second Maritimer justice in King occurred despite rumblings of a lack of representation of Western Canada. King had previous been rumored as a suitable appointee for the Supreme Court as early as 1888.

On his death in 1901, of a work-related heart attack, he was interred in the Fernhill Cemetery in Saint John, New Brunswick.

Legal historian Ian Bushnell notes that despite his eight years on the Supreme Court, King "made no mark on the jurisprudence of Canada".

== Election results ==
1878 Canadian federal election: City and County of St. John
Party	Candidate	Votes	%	Elected
Liberal	Isaac Burpee	2,686	–	✓
Liberal	Charles Wesley Weldon	2,449	–	✓
Unknown	George Edwin King	2,180	–	
Liberal	Acalus Lockwood Palmer	1,981	–	
Source: Canadian Elections Database
