= Section 58 of the Constitution Act, 1867 =

Provision of the Constitution of Canada

British North America Act, 1867

Section 58 of the Constitution Act, 1867 (French: article 58 de la Loi constitutionnelle de 1867) is a provision of the Constitution of Canada creating the office of provincial lieutenant governors, and providing for their appointment by the Governor General of Canada.

The Constitution Act, 1867 is the constitutional statute which established Canada. Originally named the British North America Act, 1867, the Act continues to be the foundational statute for the Constitution of Canada, although it has been amended many times since 1867. It is now recognised as part of the supreme law of Canada.

== Constitution Act, 1867 ==
The Constitution Act, 1867 is part of the Constitution of Canada and thus part of the supreme law of Canada. The Act sets out the constitutional framework of Canada, including the structure of the federal government and the powers of the federal government and the provinces. It was the product of extensive negotiations between the provinces of British North America at the Charlottetown Conference in 1864, the Quebec Conference in 1864, and the London Conference in 1866. Those conferences were followed by consultations with the British government in 1867. The Act was then enacted by the British Parliament under the name the British North America Act, 1867. In 1982 the Act was brought under full Canadian control through the Patriation of the Constitution, and was renamed the Constitution Act, 1867. Since Patriation, the Act can only be amended in Canada, under the amending formula set out in the Constitution Act, 1982.

== Text of section 58 ==
Section 58 reads:

Appointment of Lieutenant Governors of Provinces
58 For each Province there shall be an Officer, styled the Lieutenant Governor, appointed by the Governor General in Council by Instrument under the Great Seal of Canada.

Section 58 is found in Part V of the Constitution Act, 1867, dealing with provincial constitutions. It has not been amended since the Act was enacted in 1867.

== Legislative history ==
The term "Lieutenant Governor", had been used for governors in several of the British North American provinces prior to Confederation. However, during the conferences which resulted in the British North America Act, three different names for the office were proposed:

- "Lieutenant Governor" was proposed in the Quebec Resolutions of 1864;
- "Governor" was proposed in the London Resolutions produced by the London Conference of 1866, and was also used in the first rough draft of the bill produced in early January, 1867; (Note: The rough draft was prepared by the four provincial attorneys general present at the London Conference: John A. Macdonald, Canada West; George-Étienne Cartier, Canada East; William Alexander Henry, Nova Scotia; and Charles Fisher, New Brunswick.)
- "Superintendent" was used instead of "governor" in the first formal draft prepared by the British parliamentary drafter;
- "Lieutenant Governor" was used in all subsequent drafts, leading to the passage of the Act with that term.

The proposal for the term "superintendent", considered a "humble designation" in place of "lieutenant governor", appears to have come from the British Colonial Secretary, Lord Carnarvon, who favoured a strong central government. The term "superintendant" was used for the elected heads of the provincial councils in the original quasi-federation of New Zealand, which Macdonald had referred to in the debates on the provincial constitutions in the Parliament of the Province of Canada in 1866. However, the British North American delegates to the Lond Conference rejected the proposal, and "lieutenant governor" was restored in the draft.

== Purpose and interpretation ==
The role of the Lieutenant Governors is to represent the monarch of Canada at the provincial level. They are the formal head of the provincial executive, and also part of the provincial legislature. Under the principles of responsible government, they exercise those powers on the advice of the elected member of the legislative assembly who has the support of a majority in the assembly. The Lieutenant Governors rarely act independently. When they do so, they exercise the reserve powers of the Crown in a non-partisan way. For instance, it is the duty of the Lieutenant Governor to ensure that there is a government which has majority support in the Assembly.

In the latter part of the 19th century, a dispute arose about the constitutional status of the Lieutenant Governors. The federal government, led by Sir John A. Macdonald, asserted that the Governor General was the only representative of the monarch, capable of exercising the prerogative powers. Macdonald's position was that the lieutenant governors were statutory officers, but not representatives of the monarch, and therefore did not have the full set of prerogative powers which the monarch's representative possessed. Instead, the lieutenant governors were federal officials, and would serve a role in harmonising provincial policies with the policies of the federal government.

The alternative view, primarily set forth by Oliver Mowat, the Premier of Ontario, and Honoré Mercier, the Premier of Quebec, was that the lieutenant governors were equally the monarch's representative and therefore could exercise all of the prerogative powers of the monarch in matters relating to the provincial government. The implication of this approach was that by the principles of responsible government, the lieutenant governors would largely follow the advice of the provincial governments, not the federal government.

The dispute was resolved by the Judicial Committee of the Privy Council, at that time the highest court for the British Empire, in a pair of cases decided in 1897, six years after Macdonald's death. In a reference case from Ontario concerning the power of the provinces to appoint Queen's counsel, the Judicial Committee confirmed that the lieutenant governors are the representative of the monarch and therefore could exercise the prerogative power to appoint lawyers as Queen's counsel. In the second case, Liquidators of Maritime Bank, the Judicial Committee again held that the lieutenant governors represented the monarch, and therefore could assert the prerogative right of the monarch to be paid first in the distribution of the estate of a bankrupt.

== Related provisions ==
Section 59 of the Act deals with the tenure in office of the Lieutenant Governors.

Section 60 of the Act deals with the salary of the Lieutenant Governors.

Section 61 of the Act deals with the oath of office of the Lieutenant Governors.

Section 62 of the Act deals with the powers of the Lieutenant Governors, including officers temporarily carrying on the government on behalf of a Lieutenant Governor.

Section 66 of the Act provides that references to the Lieutenant Governors acting in council shall be construed as referring to the provincial executive councils.

Section 67 of the Act gives the Governor General the power to appoint an administrator to act in the absence or illness of a lieutenant governor.

Section 90 of the Act gives the Lieutenant Governors the same powers concerning royal assent and reservation and disallowance of provincial bills as are held by the Governor General with respect to federal bills.
