= George Scovil =

George Scovil may refer to:

- George G. Scovil (1842–?), merchant and political figure in New Brunswick, Canada
- George Scovil (priest), Canadian Anglican priest
