= Frederick Eustace Barker =

Canadian politician (1838–1915)

Sir Frederick Eustace Barker
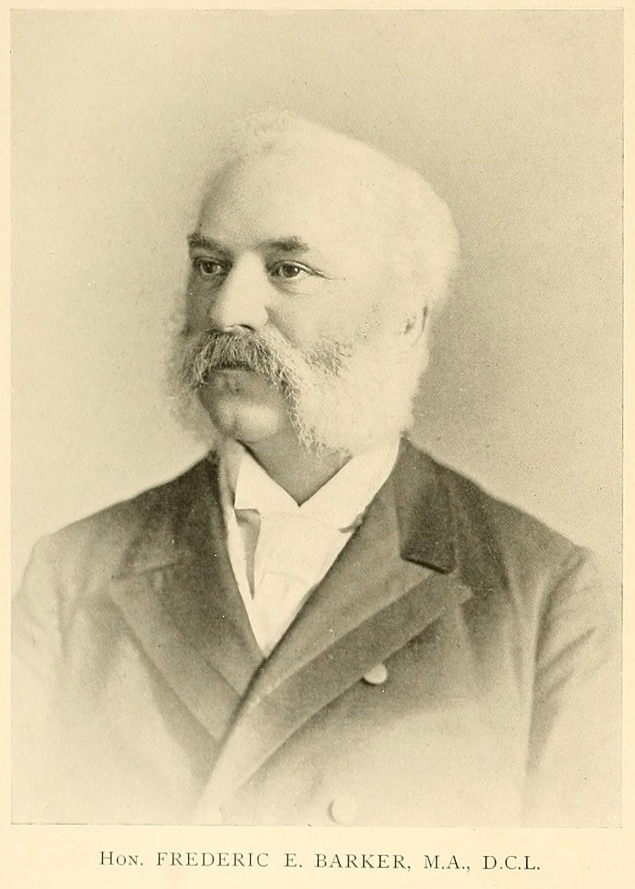

Member of the Canadian Parliament for City of St. John
- In office 1885–1887
- Preceded by: Samuel Leonard Tilley
- Succeeded by: John Valentine Ellis

Personal details
- Born: 27 December 1838 Sheffield, New Brunswick
- Died: 15 December 1915 (aged 76) Saint John, New Brunswick
- Party: Conservative

Sir Frederick Eustace Barker, KC (27 December 1838 – 15 December 1915) was a Canadian lawyer, judge and politician. He was in office for 2 years.

== Biography ==
Born in Sheffield, New Brunswick, the son of Enoch Barker, Barker was educated at the Sunbury Grammar School and received a Bachelor of Arts degree in 1856, a Master of Arts degree in 1858, and a Bachelor of Civil Law degree in 1866 from King's College Law School (now the University of New Brunswick Faculty of Law). In 1861, he was called to the Bar and was created a Queen's Counsel in 1873. He practiced law in Saint John, New Brunswick, and was appointed a commissioner for consolidating the Statutes of New Brunswick in 1875. He was president of the St. John Bridge and Railway Extension Company and a director of the St. John Gas Company.

He also served in the Canadian Militia with the Saint-John Light Infantry and was gazetted an ensign and soon after a lieutenant in 1864. He was promoted to captain in 1865 and major in 1868.

He was elected to the House of Commons of Canada for the electoral district of City of St. John in the 1885 by-election called after Sir Leonard Tilley was appointed Lieutenant-Governor of New Brunswick. A Conservative, he was defeated by John Valentine Ellis in the 1887 election.

A member of the Church of England, he married Elizabeth Julia Lloyd in 1865. They had one son and two daughter before she died in 1874. He later married Mary Ann Black, the niece and adopted daughter of former Lieutenant-Governor of New Brunswick Robert Duncan Wilmot. They had two daughters.

Barker served as Chief Justice of New Brunswick from 1908 to 1913.

He died in Saint John on 15 December 1915.

Legal offices
Preceded by William H. Tuck	Chief Justice of New Brunswick; 1908–1913	Succeeded by Ezekiel McLeod
