= Scovil =

Scovil is a given name and a surname. Notable people with the name include:

- Carlos P. Scovil (1804–1904), American lawyer and politician
- Doug Scovil (1927–1989), American football player and coach
- Elisabeth Robinson Scovil (1849–1934), Canadian nurse and writer
- George G. Scovil (1842–1908), merchant and political figure in New Brunswick, Canada
- George Scovil (priest), Canadian Anglican priest in the 20th Century
- Henry Evelyn Derek Scovil (1923–2010), physicist, worked on masers and bubble memory
- John W. Scovil (1869–1953), Canadian politician
- Thelma Scovil (1911–1979), English-born badminton player
- Walter Scovil (1823–1903), farmer and political figure in New Brunswick
- Scovil Neales (1864–1936), Dean of Fredericton, Canada

== See also ==
- 4939 Scovil, minor planet
