= Charles Arthur Everett =

Canadian politician

Charles Arthur Everett (March 24, 1828 – May 16, 1909) was a merchant and political figure in New Brunswick, Canada. He represented City and County of St. John in the House of Commons of Canada from 1885 to 1887 as a Conservative member.

Everett was an unsuccessful candidate for a federal seat in 1882. He was defeated in a bid for reelection in 1887.

1882 Canadian federal election: City and County of St. John
Party	Candidate	Votes	%	Elected
Liberal	Isaac Burpee	2,459	–	✓
Liberal	Charles Wesley Weldon	2,225	–	✓
Conservative	Charles Arthur Everett	1,925	–	
Liberal–Conservative	W.H. Tuck	1,864	–	

By-election on 20 October 1885 On Mr. Burpee's death, 1 March 1885
Party	Candidate	Votes
Conservative	Charles Arthur Everett	acclaimed

1887 Canadian federal election: City and County of St. John
Party	Candidate	Votes	%	Elected
Liberal	C.N. Skinner	4,136	–	✓
Liberal	Charles Wesley Weldon	4,063	–	✓
Conservative	Charles Arthur Everett	3,840	–	
Unknown	E. McLeod	3,628	–	

1891 Canadian federal election: City and County of St. John
Party	Candidate	Votes	%	Elected
Conservative	John Douglas Hazen	4,824	–	✓
Liberal	C.N. Skinner	4,448	–	✓
Liberal	Charles Wesley Weldon	3,832	–	
Unknown	T.A. Rankine	3,503	–	
