= City and County of St. John =

Former federal electoral district in New Brunswick, Canada

New Brunswick electoral district

Defunct federal electoral district
- Legislature: House of Commons
- District created: 1867
- District abolished: 1914
- First contested: 1867
- Last contested: 1911 by-election

Demographics
- Census division: Saint John

City and County of St. John was a federal electoral district in New Brunswick, Canada, that was represented in the House of Commons of Canada from 1867 to 1917.The district elected one member in 1867, and two members each election from 1872 to 1917.

== History ==
Originally, Saint John had a special setup for representation in Parliament. The City of Saint John itself returned one member, and the entire County of Saint John (including the city) returned one as well, and two between 1872 and 1896. In effect, the city itself had two or even three Members of Parliament. This practice continued until 1914.

After 1914, the counties of Saint John and Albert were joined, and the riding was known as St. John—Albert. It returned two Members of Parliament until 1935. In 1966, Albert County was moved to the Fundy—Royal riding and the district became known as Saint John—Lancaster. Saint John—Lancaster riding was abolished in the redistribution of ridings of 1976, and Saint John riding was created.

== Members of Parliament ==
This riding elected the following members of Parliament:

| Parliament | Years | Member | Party | Member | Party |
|---|---|---|---|---|---|
City and County of St. John; Alongside City of St. John
| 1st | 1867 – 1872 | John Hamilton Gray | Conservative | | |
| 2nd | 1872 – 1873 | Isaac Burpee | Liberal | Acalus Lockwood Palmer | Liberal |
| 2nd | 1873 – 1874 | Isaac Burpee | Liberal | Acalus Lockwood Palmer | Liberal |
| 3rd | 1874 – 1878 | Isaac Burpee | Liberal | Acalus Lockwood Palmer | Liberal |
| 4th | 1878 – 1882 | Isaac Burpee | Liberal | Charles Wesley Weldon | Liberal |
| 5th | 1882 – 1885 | Isaac Burpee | Liberal | Charles Wesley Weldon | Liberal |
| 5th | 1885 – 1887 | Charles Arthur Everett | Conservative | Charles Wesley Weldon | Liberal |
| 6th | 1887 – 1891 | Charles Nelson Skinner | Liberal | Charles Wesley Weldon | Liberal |
| 7th | 1891 – 1892 | Charles Nelson Skinner | Liberal | John Douglas Hazen | Conservative |
| 7th | 1892 – 1896 | John Alexander Chesley | Conservative | John Douglas Hazen | Conservative |
| 8th | 1896 – 1900 | Joseph John Tucker | Liberal | John Douglas Hazen | Conservative |
| 9th | 1900 – 1904 | Joseph John Tucker | Liberal | | |
| 10th | 1904 – 1907 | Alfred Augustus Stockton | Conservative | | |
| 10th | 1907 – 1908 | William Pugsley | Liberal | | |
| 11th | 1908 – 1911 | William Pugsley | Liberal | | |
| 12th | 1911 | John Waterhouse Daniel | Conservative | | |
| 12th | 1911 – 1917 | John Douglas Hazen | Conservative | | |
Riding dissolved into St. John—Albert

== Election results ==
1867 Canadian federal election
| Party | Candidate | Votes |
|---|---|---|
| Conservative | John Hamilton Gray | acclaimed |
Source: Canadian Elections Database

1872 Canadian federal election
| Party | Candidate | Votes | % | Elected |
|---|---|---|---|---|
| Liberal | Isaac Burpee | 3,249 | – | ✓ |
| Liberal | Acalus Lockwood Palmer | 2,204 | – | ✓ |
| Unknown | William Elder | 1,771 | – | |
| Unknown | D.S. Kerr | 486 | – | |
Source: Canadian Elections Database

By-election on 1 December 1873 On Mr. Burpee being appointed Minister of Customs, 7 November 1873
| Party | Candidate | Votes |
| Liberal | Isaac Burpee | acclaimed |

1874 Canadian federal election
| Party | Candidate | Votes | % | Elected |
|---|---|---|---|---|
| Liberal | Isaac Burpee | 2,826 | – | ✓ |
| Liberal | Acalus Lockwood Palmer | 2,261 | – | ✓ |
| Unknown | J.V. Ellis | 1,561 | – | |
Source: Canadian Elections Database

1878 Canadian federal election
| Party | Candidate | Votes | % | Elected |
|---|---|---|---|---|
| Liberal | Isaac Burpee | 2,686 | – | ✓ |
| Liberal | Charles Wesley Weldon | 2,449 | – | ✓ |
| Unknown | George Edwin King | 2,180 | – | |
| Liberal | Acalus Lockwood Palmer | 1,981 | – | |
Source: Canadian Elections Database

1882 Canadian federal election
| Party | Candidate | Votes | % | Elected |
|---|---|---|---|---|
| Liberal | Isaac Burpee | 2,459 | – | ✓ |
| Liberal | Charles Wesley Weldon | 2,225 | – | ✓ |
| Conservative | Charles Arthur Everett | 1,925 | – | |
| Liberal–Conservative | W.H. Tuck | 1,864 | – | |

By-election on 20 October 1885 On Mr. Burpee's death, 1 March 1885
| Party | Candidate | Votes |
| Conservative | Charles Arthur Everett | acclaimed |

1887 Canadian federal election
| Party | Candidate | Votes | % | Elected |
|---|---|---|---|---|
| Liberal | C.N. Skinner | 4,136 | – | ✓ |
| Liberal | Charles Wesley Weldon | 4,063 | – | ✓ |
| Conservative | Charles Arthur Everett | 3,840 | – | |
| Unknown | E. McLeod | 3,628 | – | |

1891 Canadian federal election
| Party | Candidate | Votes | % | Elected |
|---|---|---|---|---|
| Conservative | John Douglas Hazen | 4,824 | – | ✓ |
| Liberal | C.N. Skinner | 4,448 | – | ✓ |
| Liberal | Charles Wesley Weldon | 3,832 | – | |
| Unknown | T.A. Rankine | 3,503 | – | |

By-election on 22 November 1892 On Mr. Skinner's resignation, October, 1892
| Party | Candidate | Votes |
| Conservative | John Chesley | acclaimed |

1896 Canadian federal election
| Party | Candidate | Votes | % | Elected |
|---|---|---|---|---|
| Liberal | Joseph John Tucker | 3,924 | – | ✓ |
| Conservative | John Douglas Hazen | 3,733 | – | ✓ |
| Independent | D.J. McLaughlin | 1,495 | – | |

1900 Canadian federal election
| Party | Candidate | Votes |
|---|---|---|
| Liberal | Joseph John Tucker | 5,449 |
| Conservative | Alfred Augustus Stockton | 4,673 |

1904 Canadian federal election
| Party | Candidate | Votes |
|---|---|---|
| Conservative | Alfred Augustus Stockton | 5,601 |
| Liberal | Harrison A. McKeown | 4,964 |

By-election on 18 September 1907 On Mr. Stockton's death, 15 March 1907
| Party | Candidate | Votes |
| Liberal | William Pugsley | acclaimed |

1908 Canadian federal election
| Party | Candidate | Votes |
|---|---|---|
| Liberal | William Pugsley | 5,582 |
| Conservative | Alexander William MacRae | 5,086 |

1911 Canadian federal election
| Party | Candidate | Votes |
|---|---|---|
| Conservative | John Waterhouse Daniel | 5,491 |
| Liberal | James Lowell | 5,381 |

By-election on 27 October 1911 On Mr. Daniel's resignation, 17 October 1911
| Party | Candidate | Votes |
| Conservative | J.D. Hazen | acclaimed |

== See also ==
- List of Canadian electoral districts
- Historical federal electoral districts of Canada
