= Ora P. King =

Former Canadian politician

Member of the Legislative Assembly of New Brunswick
- In office 1902–1908 Serving with George G. Scovil, William Pugsley
- Constituency: Kings

Personal details
- Born: November 23, 1865 Sussex, New Brunswick
- Died: 1909
- Party: Independent
- Spouse: Agnes L. Connelly (m. 1907)
- Occupation: Barrister

Ora Patten King (November 23, 1865 – 1909) was a Canadian politician. He served in the Legislative Assembly of New Brunswick from 1902 to 1908 as an Independent member.
