= 1857 New Brunswick general election =

British colonial election in present-day Canada

The 1857 New Brunswick general elections happened less than a year after the 1856 elections. The new government of the colony, led by John Hamilton Gray, had trouble passing bills because of its slim majority of one member. One of the government MLA had a tendency to abstain on most objects, resulting in ties and gridlocks. Eventually, the government lost a vote of confidence, and the colony held new elections. The elections resulted in a defeat for the government and a victory for the Liberal MLAs. After the election, Charles Fisher returned to power as premier of the colony for the second time. He did not re-enact the prohibition law that caused his government to fall less than a year earlier.
