= Charles Wesley Weldon =

Canadian politician

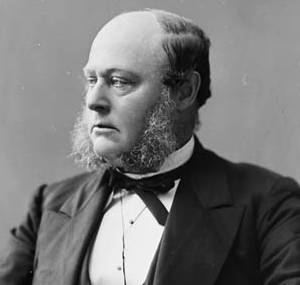
Weldon

Charles Wesley Weldon, QC (February 27, 1830 – January 12, 1896) was a Canadian lawyer and politician. He represented the City and County of St. John in the House of Commons of Canada from 1878 to 1891 as a Liberal member.

He was born in Richibucto, New Brunswick, the son of John Wesley Weldon and Frances Chandler Upham. He was educated at King's College in Windsor, Nova Scotia. He studied law in his father's office, was called to the bar in 1851 and set up practice in Saint John. In 1860, he married Annie Tucker. He was originally opposed to Confederation. In 1873, he was named Queen's Counsel. Weldon was defeated in the 1891 general election.

== Electoral record ==
1878 Canadian federal election: City and County of St. John
Party	Candidate	Votes	%	Elected
Liberal	Isaac Burpee	2,686	–	✓
Liberal	Charles Wesley Weldon	2,449	–	✓
Unknown	George Edwin King	2,180	–	
Liberal	Acalus Lockwood Palmer	1,981	–	
Source: Canadian Elections Database

1882 Canadian federal election: City and County of St. John
Party	Candidate	Votes	%	Elected
Liberal	Isaac Burpee	2,459	–	✓
Liberal	Charles Wesley Weldon	2,225	–	✓
Conservative	Charles Arthur Everett	1,925	–	
Liberal–Conservative	W.H. Tuck	1,864	–	

By-election on 20 October 1885 On Mr. Burpee's death, 1 March 1885
Party	Candidate	Votes
Conservative	Charles Arthur Everett	acclaimed

1887 Canadian federal election: City and County of St. John
Party	Candidate	Votes	%	Elected
Liberal	C.N. Skinner	4,136	–	✓
Liberal	Charles Wesley Weldon	4,063	–	✓
Conservative	Charles Arthur Everett	3,840	–	
Unknown	E. McLeod	3,628	–	

1891 Canadian federal election: City and County of St. John
Party	Candidate	Votes	%	Elected
Conservative	John Douglas Hazen	4,824	–	✓
Liberal	C.N. Skinner	4,448	–	✓
Liberal	Charles Wesley Weldon	3,832	–	
Unknown	T.A. Rankine	3,503	–	
