= 17th New Brunswick general election =

The 17th New Brunswick general election may refer to:

- 1856 New Brunswick general election, the 17th general election to take place in the Colony of New Brunswick, for the 17th New Brunswick Legislative Assembly
- 1930 New Brunswick general election, the 37th overall general election for New Brunswick, for the 37th New Brunswick Legislative Assembly, but considered the 17th general election for the Canadian province of New Brunswick.
