= Section 59 of the Constitution Act, 1867 =

Provision of the Constitution of Canada

British North America Act, 1867

Section 59 of the Constitution Act, 1867 (French: Article 59 de la Loi constitutionnelle de 1867) is a provision of the Constitution of Canada. It defines the tenure of the provincial lieutenant governors, who serve as the representative of the Canadian monarch in the provincial governments.

The section provides that lieutenant governors hold their office for five years from appointment by the governor general of Canada. It authorises the governor general to remove a lieutenant governor for cause, which must be made public by statements in the two houses of Parliament. The power to remove a lieutenant governor has been used twice, to remove Luc Letellier de Saint-Just, the third lieutenant governor of Quebec, and Thomas R. McInnes, the sixth lieutenant governor of British Columbia.

The Constitution Act, 1867 is the constitutional statute which established Canada. Originally named the British North America Act, 1867, the Act continues to be the foundational statute for the Constitution of Canada, although it has been amended many times since 1867. It is now recognised as part of the supreme law of Canada.

== Constitution Act, 1867 ==
The Constitution Act, 1867 is part of the Constitution of Canada and thus part of the supreme law of Canada. The Act sets out the constitutional framework of Canada, including the structure of the federal government and the powers of the federal government and the provinces. It was the product of extensive negotiations between the provinces of British North America at the Charlottetown Conference in 1864, the Quebec Conference in 1864, and the London Conference in 1866. Those conferences were followed by consultations with the British government in 1867. The Act was then enacted by the British Parliament under the name the British North America Act, 1867. In 1982 the Act was brought under full Canadian control through the Patriation of the Constitution, and was renamed the Constitution Act, 1867. Since Patriation, the Act can only be amended in Canada, under the amending formula set out in the Constitution Act, 1982.

== Text of section 59 ==
Section 59 reads:

Tenure of Office of Lieutenant Governor
59 A Lieutenant Governor shall hold Office during the Pleasure of the Governor General; but any Lieutenant Governor appointed after the Commencement of the First Session of the Parliament of Canada shall not be removeable within Five Years from his Appointment, except for Cause assigned, which shall be communicated to him in Writing within One Month after the Order for his Removal is made, and shall be communicated by Message to the Senate and to the House of Commons within One Week thereafter if the Parliament is then sitting, and if not then within One Week after the Commencement of the next Session of the Parliament.

Section 59 is found in Part V of the Constitution Act, 1867, dealing with provincial constitutions. It has never been amended.

== Legislative history ==
In the Quebec Resolutions, the office of lieutenant governor and the tenure in office were combined in one lengthy resolution. The appointment was at pleasure, but the power to dismiss could only be for cause, until the expiration of the first five years in office. If a lieutenant governor were dismissed, notice had to be given, and a message provided to both houses of Parliament within one week of the next session of Parliament.

The Quebec Resolutions provided that the Province of Canada would be divided into two new provinces, Ontario and Quebec, and left the constitutional structure of the two new provinces to the Province of Canada.

In July 1866, the Parliament of the Province of Canada considered an additional set of resolutions, to set out the framework for the constitutions of the two new provinces.

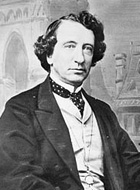
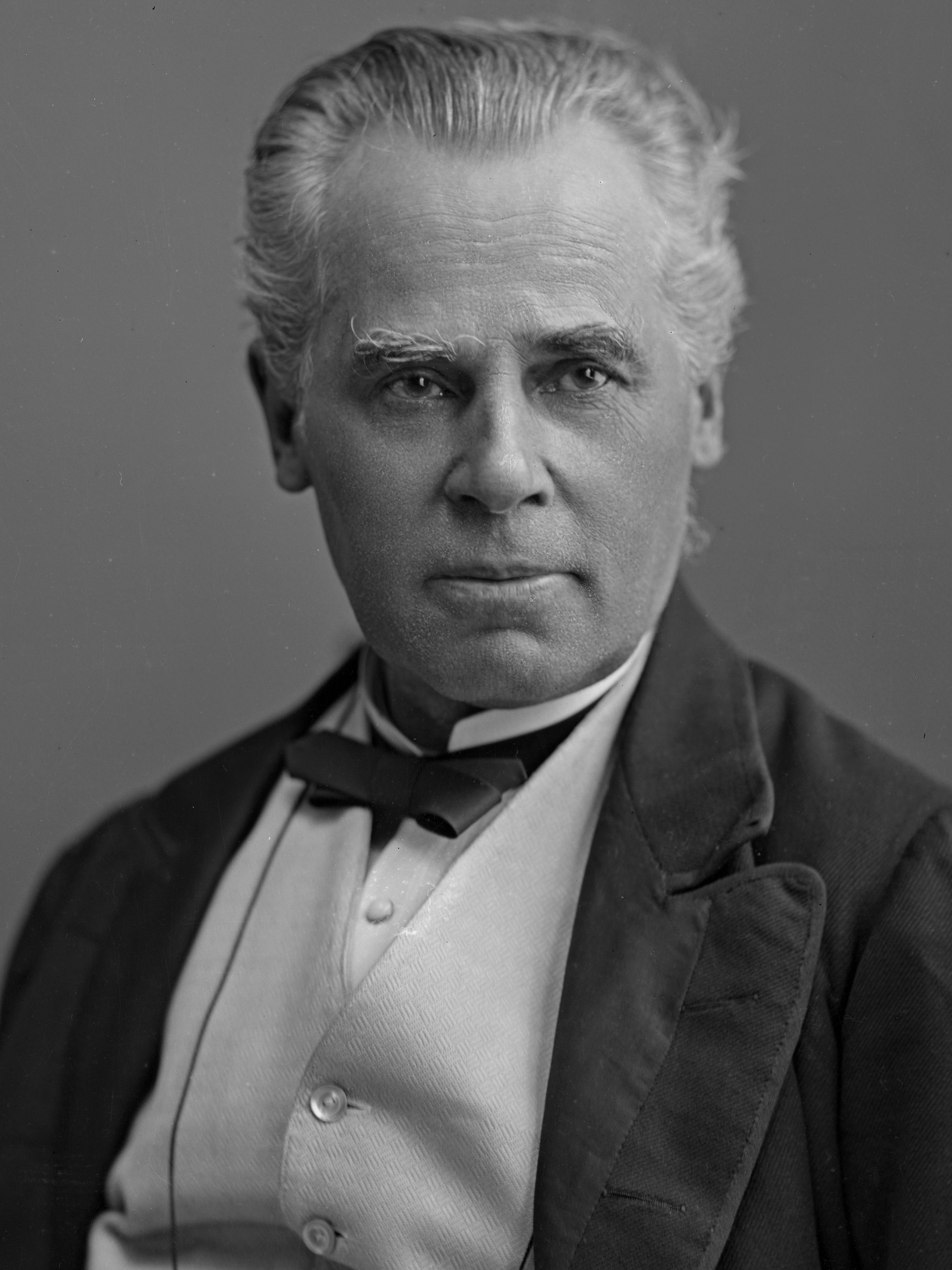
John A. Macdonald and George Etienne Cartier, who introduced the resolutions for the provincial constitutions

The additional resolutions were introduced in the Legislative Assembly on July 13, 1866, by the joint premiers, John A. Macdonald and George-Étienne Cartier. Debate began on the first resolution, which dealt with the lieutenant governors, but was adjourned. When the debate was resumed two weeks later, Macdonald and Cartier moved an amendment to the first resolution, stating that the appointments of the first lieutenant governors should be provisional, and that the first lieutenant governors should hold office "strictly during pleasure". After further debate, that amendment eventually passed.

At the London Conference in December 1866, the delegates adopted the same approach as in the Quebec Resolutions, but followed the resolution from the Province of Canada and added the condition that the first appointments should be provisional, and strictly at pleasure.

A sub-committee of the four provincial attorneys general then prepared a rough draft of the proposed bill. (Note: The four attorneys general were John A. Macdonald, Canada West; George-Étienne Cartier, Canada East; William Alexander Henry, Nova Scotia; and Charles Fisher, New Brunswick.) That draft provided that the governors of the provinces would hold office for pleasure, but could only be removed for cause for the first five years of their term. A separate clause provided that the first appointments under the act were to be provisional, entirely at pleasure.

The next draft of the bill used the term "superintendent" rather than lieutenant governor. It provided that the superintendents held office during pleasure, but that the superintendents appointed after the beginning of the first session of Parliament could only be removed for cause for the five years from their appointment.

The next draft restored the term "lieutenant governor" instead of "superintendent". With that change, the provision took its final form.

== Purpose and interpretation ==
=== General purpose ===
Section 59 balances two competing interests: the lieutenant governors should be given some degree of security of tenure, to ensure they are able to carry out their functions impartially, but at the same time, there is a mechanism to remove a lieutenant governor if needed. During the Confederation Debates in 1865, John A. Macdonald expressed his understanding of the position of lieutenant governor. In his view, the lieutenant governors were to be the chief executive officer of the provinces, but were to represent the federal government's interests and were subordinate to the federal government. The federal government therefore had the dismissal power.

The removal power has been used twice since Confederation: in 1878, to dismiss Luc Letellier de St-Just, lieutenant governor of Quebec, and in 1900, to dismiss Thomas R. McInnes, lieutenant governor of British Columbia.

=== Dismissal of Letellier de St-Just, 1878 ===
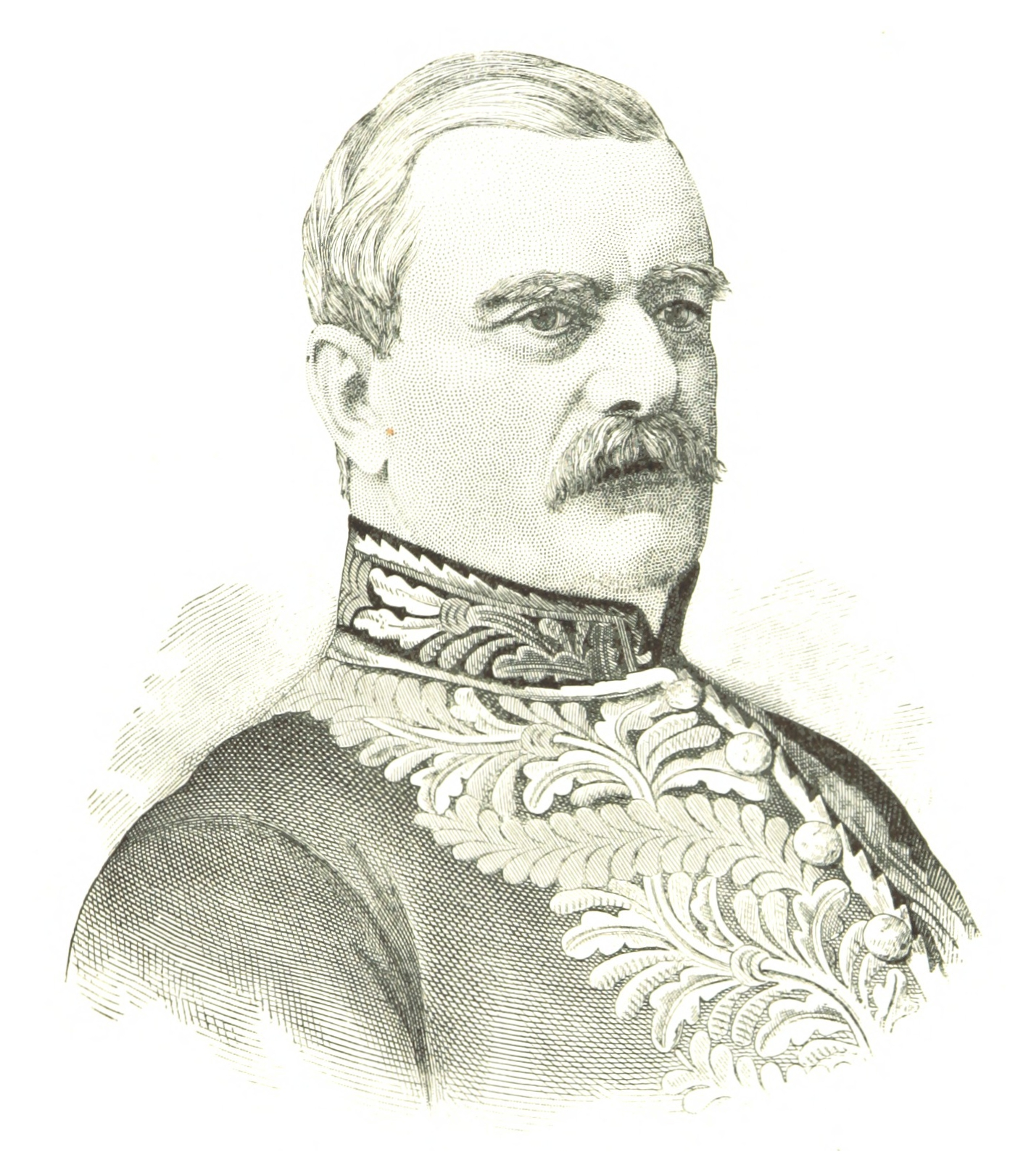
Luc Letellier, Lieutenant Governor of Quebec

Letellier de St-Just had been an elected member of the Rouge party in the Parliament of the Province of Canada, prior to Confederation, and then was appointed to the Senate of Canada in 1867. As a senator, he was a strong supporter of the Liberal government of Prime Minister Alexander Mackenzie and a member of the federal cabinet from 1873 until 1876, when Mackenzie appointed him the lieutenant governor of Quebec.

The provincial government of Quebec at that time was Conservative, headed by Premier Charles Boucher de Boucherville. One of the major issues in provincial politics was the construction of railways. Letellier disagreed with the government's railway policies. In March 1878, Letellier used his power as lieutenant governor to dismiss the premier, even though Boucher had a majority in the Legislative Assembly. Letellier then appointed the leader of the provincial Liberal party, Henri-Gustave Joly de Lotbinière, as premier. His actions created great controversy, with the Conservative opposition referring to his actions as a coup d'état. Prime Minister Mackenzie strongly disapproved of Letellier's decision, but did not intervene.

In the 1878 federal elections, Macdonald was returned to office. The Quebec Conservatives called for action against Letellier. The House of Commons passed a resolution calling for his dismissal, on the basis that his dismissal of Premier Boucher was subversive of the basic principles of responsible government . Macdonald reviewed the matter and considered it for some time, and also sent two representatives to London to confer with the imperial government on the propriety of removing a lieutenant governor. The Colonial Secretary declined to take any action. In July 1879, Macdonald and the Cabinet advised the governor general to remove Letellier, with the cause being that "the usefulness of M. Letellier, as lieutenant governor, was gone."

=== Dismissal of McInnes, 1900 ===
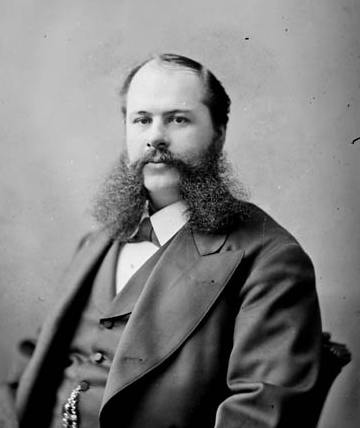
Thomas McInnes, Lieutenant Governor of British Columbia

McInnes, originally from Nova Scotia, had been an independent member of the House of Commons and later was appointed to the Senate by Macdonald. He resigned from the Senate in 1897 when he was appointed the Lieutenant Governor of British Columbia by Prime Minister Wilfrid Laurier. By that point he was considered a Liberal. The political situation in British Columbia was turbulent. Political parties were very weak, and governments were based more on personal relationships between the elected members than on firm political alliances.

Following the 1898 provincial election, McInnes dismissed the incumbent premier, John H. Turner, who had only minority support in the new Assembly, and appointed the opposition leader, Charles Semlin, as premier. When Semlin's government fell on a motion of non-confidence in 1900, McInnes dismissed him and appointed the attorney general, Joseph Martin as premier. When the Martin government fell on a non-confidence motion, McInnes dissolved the assembly and called general elections. The Martin government was not returned to office. Prime Minister Laurier advised McInnes that since his choice of premier had been rejected by the electorate, McInnes should resign. McInnes refused, and Laurier advised the governor general to dismiss him, on the basis that McInnes's "official conduct has been subversive of the principles of responsible government". Like Letellier, the notice stated that McInnes's usefulness as lieutenant governor was gone.

== Related provisions of the Constitution Act, 1867 ==
Section 58 of the act creates the office of lieutenant governor for each province.
