= Alfred Augustus Stockton =

Canadian politician

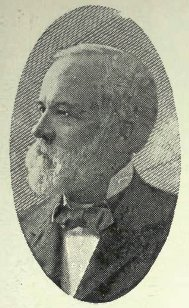

Member of the Canadian Parliament for City and County of St. John
- In office 1904–1907
- Preceded by: Joseph John Tucker
- Succeeded by: William Pugsley

Member of the Legislative Assembly of New Brunswick for Saint John
- In office 1883–1899

Leader of the Opposition (New Brunswick)
- In office 1892–1899
- Preceded by: Daniel Lionel Hanington
- Succeeded by: John Douglas Hazen

Personal details
- Born: November 2, 1842 Studholm Parish, New Brunswick
- Died: March 15, 1907 (aged 64) Ottawa, Ontario, Canada
- Party: Conservative

Alfred Augustus Stockton, Ph.D, LL.D (November 2, 1842 – March 15, 1907) was a Canadian lawyer, professor, politician, and writer.

Born in Studholm, New Brunswick, the son of William Augustus Wiggins Stockton and Sarah Oldfield, Stockton received a Bachelor of Arts degree and a Master of Arts degree in 1867 from Mount Allison Wesleyan Academy (now Mount Allison University). He also received a Bachelor of Laws degree in 1869 and an LL.D in 1887 from Victoria University in Cobourg, Ontario (now Victoria University in the University of Toronto). In 1883, he received a Ph.D by examination and dissertation from Illinois Wesleyan University. He was called to the New Brunswick Bar in 1868.

From 1883 to 1899, he was a member of the Legislative Assembly of New Brunswick (for Saint John County to 1892 and Saint John City to 1899) and Leader of the Opposition from 1892 to 1899. He was elected to the House of Commons of Canada for City and County of St. John in the 1904 federal election. A Conservative. He served until his death in 1907.

1900 Canadian federal election: City and County of St. John
Party	Candidate	Votes
Liberal	Joseph John Tucker	5,449
Conservative	Alfred Augustus Stockton	4,673

1904 Canadian federal election: City and County of St. John
Party	Candidate	Votes
Conservative	Alfred Augustus Stockton	5,601
Liberal	Harrison A. McKeown	4,964
