= William Wedderburn (Canadian politician) =

Canadian lawyer, journalist, judge and political figure

William Wedderburn, QC (October 12, 1834 – April 5, 1918) was a lawyer, journalist, judge and political figure in the Province of New Brunswick, Canada. He represented the city of Saint John in the Legislative Assembly of New Brunswick from 1870 to 1882.

He was born and raised in Saint John, the son of Alexander Wedderburn, a Scottish immigrant, and Jane Heaviside, from London, England. He studied law with John Hamilton Gray and was called to the bar in 1858. In that same year, he married Jeannie Vaughan. In 1873, he was named Queen's Counsel. Also in 1873, Wedderburn was named a commissioner to consolidate the statutes for the province. Wedderburn served as president of the St. John Mechanics' Institute, was a Grand Master for the Freemasons and was a prominent member of the Sons of Temperance. He served as speaker for the provincial assembly from 1875 to 1878, when he was named provincial secretary. Wedderburn was an early supporter of Confederation. In 1882, he was named a judge for the court for Kings and Albert counties.
