= Mary Love (disambiguation) =

Mary Love (1943–2013) was an American soul and gospel singer

Mary Love may also refer to:

- Mary Ann Love (born 1940), American politician from Maryland
- Mary Love (artist) (1806–1874), Canadian artist
- Mary Love (writer) (on or before 1639–1663), English religious writer and biographer
