= 18th New Brunswick general election =

18th New Brunswick general election may refer to:

- 1857 New Brunswick general election, the 18th general election to take place in the Colony of New Brunswick, for the 18th New Brunswick Legislative Assembly
- 1935 New Brunswick general election, the 38th overall general election for New Brunswick, for the 38th New Brunswick Legislative Assembly, but considered the 18th general election for the Canadian province of New Brunswick
