= Acalus Lockwood Palmer =

Canadian politician

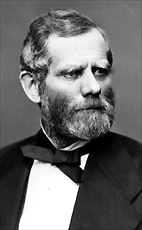
A. L. Palmer, QC

Acalus Lockwood Palmer, QC (August 28, 1820 – August 10, 1899) was a Canadian politician, lawyer and judge.

Palmer was born in Sackville, New Brunswick, to Philip Palmer and Sarah Ayer. He was educated in Sackville, studied law with Edward Barron Chandler and was admitted to the bar in 1846. In 1850, he married Martha Ann Welden. Palmer practiced law in Dorchester until 1867 when he moved to Saint John. In the same year, he became a Queen's Counsel. He ran unsuccessfully in Northumberland County for a seat in the provincial assembly before Confederation and again unsuccessfully for the City of St. John in 1870. Palmer was elected to the House of Commons of Canada as a member of the Liberal Party of Canada on October 12, 1872, to represent the riding of the City and County of St. John, New Brunswick and he was re-elected in 1874, but was defeated on September 17, 1878.

In 1879, he was named a judge of equity. Palmer also served as president for the New Brunswick bar association.

His brothers Rufus and Martin served in the New Brunswick assembly.

== Electoral record ==
By-election on 1 December 1873 On Mr. Burpee being appointed Minister of Customs, 7 November 1873
| Party | Candidate | Votes |
| Liberal | Isaac Burpee | acclaimed |

1874 Canadian federal election: City and County of St. John
| Party | Candidate | Votes | % | Elected |
|---|---|---|---|---|
| Liberal | Isaac Burpee | 2,826 | – | ✓ |
| Liberal | Acalus Lockwood Palmer | 2,261 | – | ✓ |
| Unknown | J.V. Ellis | 1,561 | – | |
Source: Canadian Elections Database

1878 Canadian federal election: City and County of St. John
| Party | Candidate | Votes | % | Elected |
|---|---|---|---|---|
| Liberal | Isaac Burpee | 2,686 | – | ✓ |
| Liberal | Charles Wesley Weldon | 2,449 | – | ✓ |
| Unknown | George Edwin King | 2,180 | – | |
| Liberal | Acalus Lockwood Palmer | 1,981 | – | |
Source: Canadian Elections Database

Parliament of Canada
| Preceded by Isaac Burpee | Member of Parliament for the City and County of St. John; 1872–1878 | Succeeded by Charles Wesley Weldon |
