= City of St. John =

Former federal electoral district in New Brunswick, Canada

New Brunswick electoral district

Defunct federal electoral district
- Legislature: House of Commons
- District created: 1867
- District abolished: 1914
- First contested: 1867
- Last contested: 1917

Demographics
- Census division(s): Saint John
- Census subdivision(s): Saint John

City of St. John was a federal electoral district in New Brunswick, Canada, that was represented in the House of Commons of Canada from 1867 to 1917.

== History ==
Originally, Saint John had a special setup for representation in Parliament. The City of Saint John itself returned one member, and the entire County of Saint John (including the city) returned one as well, and two between 1872 and 1896. In effect, the city itself had two or even three Members of Parliament. This practice continued until 1914.

After 1914, the counties of Saint John and Albert were joined, and the riding was known as St. John—Albert. It returned two Members of Parliament until 1935. In 1966, Albert County was moved to the Fundy—Royal riding and the district became known as Saint John—Lancaster. Saint John—Lancaster riding was abolished in the redistribution of ridings of 1976, and Saint John riding was created.

== Members of Parliament ==
This riding elected the following members of Parliament:

Parliament	Years	Member	Party
City of St. John; Alongside City and County of St. John
1st	1867–1872	Samuel Leonard Tilley	Liberal–Conservative
2nd	1872–1873	Samuel Leonard Tilley	Liberal–Conservative
2nd	1873–1874	Jeremiah Smith Boies De Veber	Liberal
3rd	1874–1878	Jeremiah Smith Boies De Veber	Liberal
4th	1878–1878	Samuel Leonard Tilley	Liberal–Conservative
4th	1878–1882	Samuel Leonard Tilley	Liberal–Conservative
5th	1882–1885	Samuel Leonard Tilley	Liberal–Conservative
5th	1885–1887	Frederick Eustace Barker	Conservative
6th	1887–1891	John Valentine Ellis	Liberal
7th	1891–1896	Ezekiel McLeod	Conservative
8th	1896–1900	John Valentine Ellis	Liberal
9th	1900–1903	Andrew George Blair	Liberal
9th	1904–1904	John Waterhouse Daniel	Conservative
10th	1904–1908	John Waterhouse Daniel	Conservative
11th	1908–1911	John Waterhouse Daniel	Conservative
12th	1911–1917	William Pugsley	Liberal
Riding dissolved into St. John—Albert

== Election results ==
1867 Canadian federal election
Party	Candidate	Votes
Liberal–Conservative	Samuel Leonard Tilley	1,402
Unknown	John Wilson	610

1872 Canadian federal election
Party	Candidate	Votes
Liberal–Conservative	Samuel Leonard Tilley	1,765
Unknown	Jeremiah Smith Boies De Veber	1,225

By-election: On Mr. Tilley being appointed Lieutenant-Governor of New Brunswick, 15 November 1873

By-election on 1 December 1873
Party	Candidate	Votes
Liberal	Jeremiah Smith Boies De Veber	acclaimed

1874 Canadian federal election
Party	Candidate	Votes
Liberal	Jeremiah Smith Boies De Veber	1,772
Unknown	G.W. Day	591

1878 Canadian federal election
Party	Candidate	Votes
Liberal–Conservative	Samuel Leonard Tilley	1,475
Liberal	Jeremiah Smith Boies De Veber	1,466

By-election: On Mr. Tilley being appointed Minister of Finance, 17 October 1878

By-election on 4 November 1878
Party	Candidate	Votes
Liberal–Conservative	Samuel Leonard Tilley	acclaimed

1882 Canadian federal election
Party	Candidate	Votes
Liberal–Conservative	Sir Samuel Leonard Tilley	1,288
Independent	George McLeod	1,151

By-election: On Mr. Tilley being appointed Lieutenant-Governor of New Brunswick, 12 November 1885

By-election on 24 November 1885
Party	Candidate	Votes
Conservative	Frederick Eustace Barker	acclaimed

1887 Canadian federal election
Party	Candidate	Votes
Liberal	John V. Ellis	2,375
Conservative	Frederick Eustace Barker	2,162

1891 Canadian federal election
Party	Candidate	Votes
Conservative	Ezekiel McLeod	2,649
Liberal	John V. Ellis	2,063

1896 Canadian federal election
Party	Candidate	Votes
Liberal	ELLIS, John V.	3,249
Conservative	CHESLEY, John A.	2,527
Independent	PUGSLEY, William	1,427

1900 Canadian federal election
Party	Candidate	Votes
Liberal	BLAIR, Hon. Andrew George	4,520
Conservative	FOSTER, Hon. George Eulas	3,523

By-election: On Mr. Blair's resignation, 27 December 1903

By-election on 16 February 1904
Party	Candidate	Votes
Conservative	DANIEL, J.W.	3,709
Unknown	MCKEOWN, H.A.	3,440

1904 Canadian federal election
Party	Candidate	Votes
Conservative	DANIEL, John W.	4,881
Liberal	O'BRIEN, Richard	3,670

1908 Canadian federal election
Party	Candidate	Votes
Conservative	DANIEL, John W.	4,394
Liberal	PENDER, James	4,202

1911 Canadian federal election
Party	Candidate	Votes
Liberal	PUGSLEY, Hon. William	4,360
Conservative	POWELL, Henry Absalom	4,295

== See also ==
- List of Canadian electoral districts
- Historical federal electoral districts of Canada
