= Charles Nelson Skinner =

Canadian politician

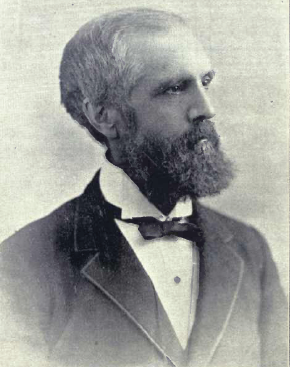

Member of the Canadian Parliament for City and County of St. John
- In office 1887–1892 Serving with Charles Wesley Weldon (1887-1891); John Douglas Hazen (1891-1892)
- Preceded by: Isaac Burpee
- Succeeded by: John Alexander Chesley

Personal details
- Born: March 12, 1833 Saint John, Colony of New Brunswick
- Died: September 22, 1910 (aged 77)
- Party: Liberal

Charles Nelson Skinner (March 12, 1833 – September 22, 1910) was a Canadian lawyer, judge, and politician.

Born in Saint John, New Brunswick, the son of Samuel and Phoebe S. (Golding) Skinner, Skinner was educated at the public and Grammar schools of Saint John. After leaving school, he prepared for the legal profession. He studied law in the office of C. W. Stockton, and was admitted to the Bar, Trinity term, 1860. He commenced to practice his profession in partnership with George G. Gilbert, under the firm name of Gilbert & Skinner. This partnership lasted about four years, when he began practice in his own name, and so continued until January 1894, when he took his two sons into partnership, Charles S. and Sherwood Skinner, the firm name being C. N. Skinner & Sons.

He was a member of the New Brunswick Legislature from 1862 to 1868 and was Solicitor General from 1865 to 1868. From 1868 to 1885, he was a judge of probate. In 1887, he was elected to the House of Commons of Canada for the City and County of St. John. He was also re-elected for the same constituency in 1891, but resigned his seat in 1892 when he was re-appointed a judge.

He was a member of the Orange Order and of the Independent Order of Odd Fellows. He was married to Eliza J. McLaughlin and had five sons and three daughters.

== Electoral record ==
1887 Canadian federal election: City and County of St. John
Party	Candidate	Votes	%	Elected
Liberal	C.N. Skinner	4,136	–	✓
Liberal	Charles Wesley Weldon	4,063	–	✓
Conservative	Charles Arthur Everett	3,840	–	
Unknown	E. McLeod	3,628	–	

1891 Canadian federal election: City and County of St. John
Party	Candidate	Votes	%	Elected
Conservative	John Douglas Hazen	4,824	–	✓
Liberal	C.N. Skinner	4,448	–	✓
Liberal	Charles Wesley Weldon	3,832	–	
Unknown	T.A. Rankine	3,503	–	
