= Mary Love (artist) =

Canadian artist

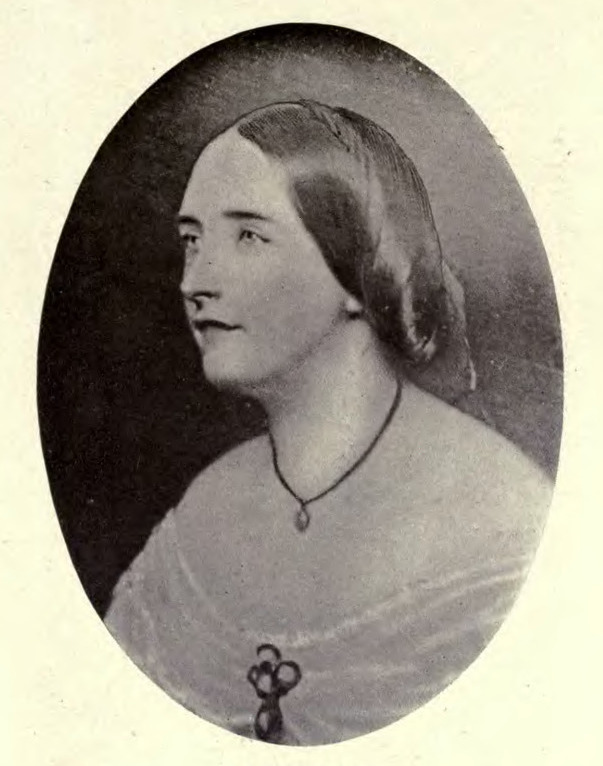
- Born: Mary Heaviside; June 25, 1806
- Died: November 2, 1874 (aged 68); Cranley Place, London
- Other names: Lady Mary Love
- Occupations: Artist and lithographer
- Years active: 1825-1841

Mary Heaviside Love (June 25, 1806 – November 2, 1874), also known as Lady Mary Love and Mary Love, was an artist from British North America active from 1825 to 1842. Her lithograph A view on the St. Croix River, New Brunswick, circa 1830, was possibly the first lithograph made in British North America. She was one of the first British North American artists to go abroad for her studies.

== Biography ==
Love was born Mary Heaviside on June 25, 1806 to parents Thomas and Elizabeth Heaviside. She was the youngest of the Heaviside children. There is some scholarly debate about whether she was born in Saint John, New Brunswick or Halifax, Nova Scotia. In 1819, Love's sister, Anna Maria Heaviside, married clergyman Robert Willis. Another of Love's sisters, Jane, married Alexander Wedderburn in 1923.

Love studied art in the United Kingdom in the 1820s and was one of the first British North American artists to pursue artistic studies abroad. On July 16, 1825, Mary married Lieutenant-Colonel James Frederick Love in New Brunswick. After her marriage, Mary developed her skills in drawing and watercolour. Henry James Morgan remarked that he would like to have Love's watercolours of the Eastern Townships published. The 1960 New Brunswick Museum Art Bulletin described Love's lithographs A view near St. Andrews, New Brunswick (Chamcook) and A view on the St. Croix River, New Brunswick as likely being the first drawn-on-stone lithographs in British North America.

In 1856, her husband was knighted. As a result of his title, Love officially became Lady Mary Love. The Loves travelled to London where James Love died in 1866. The two had no children. Little is known of Mary Love's life after the death of her husband. Love died at Cranley Place, London, England in 1874.

== Works ==
- A view near St. Andrews, New Brunswick (Chamcook) — drawn on stone, lithographed by John B. Pendleton in 1830
- A view on the St. Croix River, New Brunswick — drawn on stone, lithographed by John B. Pendleton in 1830
- Illustrations in The British Dominions in North America (2 vols., London, 1832) by Joseph Bouchette
  - New Government House, Fredericton, N.B. — signed "By a Lady" but generally considered to be Love's work
  - Barracks and Market Square, Fredericton, N.B. — signed "By a Lady" but generally considered to be Love's work

Works of uncertain attribution:

- Illustrations for A Peep at the Esquimaux (1825 book of poems)
- On the Kennebeckasis near St. John in Bouchette's The British Dominions in North America
