= Claude D. Taylor =

Canadian politician

Member of the Legislative Assembly of New Brunswick
- In office 1952–1970 Serving with Everett Newcomb
- Constituency: Albert

Personal details
- Born: September 23, 1911 Edgetts Landing, New Brunswick
- Died: February 1, 1970 (aged 58) Moncton, New Brunswick
- Party: Progressive Conservative Party of New Brunswick
- Spouse: Winnifred Way (m. 1938)

Claude D. Taylor (September 23, 1911 – February 1, 1970) was a real estate agent and political figure in New Brunswick. He represented Albert in the Legislative Assembly of New Brunswick from 1952 until his death in 1970 as a Progressive Conservative member.

He was born in Edgetts Landing, Albert County, New Brunswick, the son of Douglas Taylor and Bernice Steeves, and was educated at the provincial normal school in Fredericton and at Mount Allison University. In 1938, he married Winnifred Way.

Taylor served in the province's Executive Council as Minister of Education and Municipal Affairs from 1952 to 1954 and Minister of Education from 1954 to 1960. Taylor was also a public school teacher for 13 years

Claude D. Taylor School (an elementary school in Riverview, New Brunswick) is named in his honour.

== See also ==
- Claude D. Taylor School
