= Joseph John Tucker =

Canadian politician

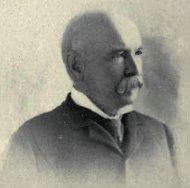

Member of the Canadian Parliament for City and County of St. John
- In office 1896–1904
- Preceded by: John Alexander Chesley
- Succeeded by: Alfred Augustus Stockton

Personal details
- Born: 1832 Chatham, Kent, England
- Died: November 23, 1914 (aged 81–82) Saint John, New Brunswick
- Party: Liberal

Joseph John Tucker (1832 – November 23, 1914) was a Canadian politician.

Born in Chatham, Kent, England, the son of John Tucker, Joseph emigrated to Canada with his father at an early age. He was, for twenty years, the chief surveyor for Lloyds in the East and resided in Shanghai. Tucker commanded a transport vessel during the Crimean War. He was a Lieutenant-Colonel with the 62nd Battalion, Saint John Fusiliers. He was elected to the House of Commons of Canada for the New Brunswick electoral district of City and County of Saint John in the 1896 federal election. A Liberal, he was re-elected in 1900. Tucker was president and partner for the Morning Telegraph Publishing Company and a director of the Saint John Railway Company.

== Electoral record ==
1896 Canadian federal election: City and County of St. John
Party	Candidate	Votes	%	Elected
Liberal	Joseph John Tucker	3,924	–	✓
Conservative	John Douglas Hazen	3,733	–	✓
Independent	D.J. McLaughlin	1,495	–	

1900 Canadian federal election: City and County of St. John
Party	Candidate	Votes
Liberal	Joseph John Tucker	5,449
Conservative	Alfred Augustus Stockton	4,673
