= Sanford S. Ryan =

Canadian politician

Member of the Legislative Assembly of New Brunswick
- In office 1900–1908 Serving with Charles J. Osman
- Constituency: Albert

Personal details
- Born: June 29, 1855 Coverdale, New Brunswick
- Died: May 9, 1933 (aged 77) Coverdale, New Brunswick
- Party: Independent
- Spouse(s): Achsah G. Gallisher (m. 1892, died) Martha Mackenzie (m. 1895)
- Relations: James Ryan (father)
- Children: 1
- Occupation: farmer

Sanford Stephen Ryan (June 29, 1855 – May 9, 1933) was a Canadian politician. He served in the Legislative Assembly of New Brunswick from 1900 to 1908 as an independent member.
