= Fred Colpitts =

Canadian politician

Member of the Legislative Assembly of New Brunswick
- In office 1931–1939
- Constituency: Albert

Personal details
- Born: May 20, 1887 Little River, New Brunswick
- Died: June 3, 1963 (aged 76) Salisbury, New Brunswick
- Party: New Brunswick Liberal Association

Fred Colpitts (May 20, 1889 – June 3, 1963) was a Canadian politician. He served in the Legislative Assembly of New Brunswick as member of the Liberal party from 1931 to 1939. Aside from his political involvement, Colpitts was also a well known farmer and fox rancher. He was born in Little River, New Brunswick.

== Farming career ==
In 1913, Colpitts bought 3 black foxes from which he and his brother James would develop the largest ranch in the British empire. Known as the “Colpitts Brothers”, Fred and James replaced their black foxes with silver foxes and used selective breeding to refine the fox color. James lived on a ranch in the west of Canada, the two brothers sold foxes for breeding stock throughout North America.

Fred Colpitts developed the Platinum fox that was recognized for its unique color and markings worldwide. These Platinum foxes brought top dollar from sales in Montreal, New York and London, with one pair of foxes selling for five thousand dollars, and winning major awards at shows across Canada.

Fred Colpitts was also a beef, swine and dairy farmer. In 1927 he bought a registered Holstein dairy herd and was involved in the founding of the New Brunswick Branch Holstein-Friesian Association.

== Attributes ==
Fred Colpitts was known for being friendly, generous, community minded and a true leader.
