= Isaac Burpee =

Canadian politician

The Honourable Isaac Burpee PC
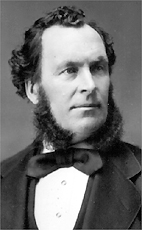

Member of the Canadian Parliament for City and County of St. John
- In office 1872–1885
- Preceded by: John Hamilton Gray
- Succeeded by: Charles Arthur Everett

Personal details
- Born: November 28, 1825 Sheffield, New Brunswick
- Died: March 1, 1885 (aged 59) New York City, New York
- Party: Liberal
- Cabinet: Minister of Customs (1873-1878); Minister of Agriculture (Acting) (1876-1877)

Isaac Burpee, PC (November 28, 1825 – March 1, 1885) was a Canadian merchant, entrepreneur, and politician.

Born in Sheffield, New Brunswick, the son of Isaac Burpee and Phoebe Coban, he was elected as a Liberal to the House of Commons of Canada in 1872 representing the riding of City and County of St. John, New Brunswick. He was the Minister of Customs and Minister of Agriculture (Acting). He served until his death in 1885.

== Electoral record ==
1872 Canadian federal election: City and County of St. John
Party	Candidate	Votes	%	Elected
Liberal	Isaac Burpee	3,249	–	✓
Liberal	Acalus Lockwood Palmer	2,204	–	✓
Unknown	William Elder	1,771	–	
Unknown	D.S. Kerr	486	–	
Source: Canadian Elections Database

By-election on 1 December 1873 On Mr. Burpee being appointed Minister of Customs, 7 November 1873
Party	Candidate	Votes
Liberal	Isaac Burpee	acclaimed

1874 Canadian federal election: City and County of St. John
Party	Candidate	Votes	%	Elected
Liberal	Isaac Burpee	2,826	–	✓
Liberal	Acalus Lockwood Palmer	2,261	–	✓
Unknown	J.V. Ellis	1,561	–	
Source: Canadian Elections Database

1878 Canadian federal election: City and County of St. John
Party	Candidate	Votes	%	Elected
Liberal	Isaac Burpee	2,686	–	✓
Liberal	Charles Wesley Weldon	2,449	–	✓
Unknown	George Edwin King	2,180	–	
Liberal	Acalus Lockwood Palmer	1,981	–	
Source: Canadian Elections Database

1882 Canadian federal election: City and County of St. John
Party	Candidate	Votes	%	Elected
Liberal	Isaac Burpee	2,459	–	✓
Liberal	Charles Wesley Weldon	2,225	–	✓
Conservative	Charles Arthur Everett	1,925	–	
Liberal–Conservative	W.H. Tuck	1,864	–	
