= John Alexander Chesley =

Canadian politician

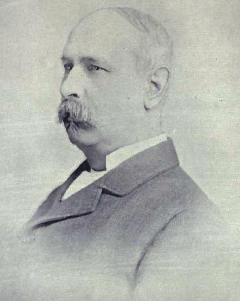

Member of the Canadian Parliament for City and County of St. John
- In office 1892–1896
- Preceded by: John Douglas Hazen
- Succeeded by: Joseph John Tucker

Personal details
- Born: 1837 Portland, New Brunswick, British North America
- Died: 28 December 1922 (aged 84–85) Montreal, Quebec, Canada
- Party: Conservative

John Alexander Chesley (1837 – 28 December 1922) was a Canadian politician.

Born in Portland, New Brunswick, the son of William A. Chesley and Mary Ann Algee, Chesley received his education at the schools of St. John and at the Albert County Grammar School. He then worked on a farm for a time, after which he learned the engineering and machinist business. He subsequently engaged in business for himself and was the proprietor of an extensive foundry.

In 1881, he was appointed census commissioner for the Saint John County and was also one of the Dominion Liquor License Commissioners. He was first elected to the Council Board of the city of Portland in 1876, remaining until 1885. During that time, he was elected to the Council of the Municipality of the City and County of St. John. He was mayor of Portland in 1885 and 1886, and elected by acclamation, to the same office, in 1888.

During that time, an act was passed by the Legislative Assembly of New Brunswick for the purpose of appointing three commissioners to prepare a scheme to unite Portland with the city of St. John. Chesley was appointed to represent the city of Portland on this commission. A vote was taken in the Spring of 1889, and the scheme of union, submitted to the people, was carried by a large majority, Portland and St. John becoming one corporation. Chesley again became alderman, and continued so until 1894, when he retired.

He was warden of the County in 1891 and 1892, and at the by-election of 1892 for the riding of City and County of St. John, on the retirement of the current MP Charles Nelson Skinner, who was appointed to the office of Judge of Probate, he was acclaimed to the House of Commons of Canada. A Conservative, he was defeated in the 1896 election.

Chesley was married twice: first, in December 1860, to Mary F. Small; and again, in 1872, to Annie May. He had eight children. He was an Episcopalian.

He died in Montreal on 28 December 1922.

== Electoral record ==
By-election on 22 November 1892 On Mr. Skinner's resignation, October, 1892
Party	Candidate	Votes
Conservative	John Chesley	acclaimed
