= John Boyd (Canadian politician) =

Canadian politician

The Honourable John Boyd
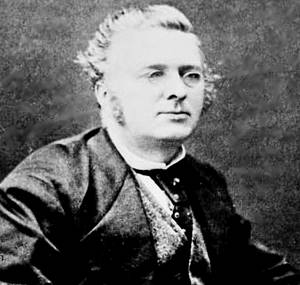
- John Boyd (Source: Library and Archives Canada)

8th Lieutenant Governor of New Brunswick
- In office September 21, 1893 – December 4, 1893
- Monarch: Victoria
- Governor General: The Earl of Aberdeen
- Premier: Andrew George Blair
- Preceded by: Samuel Leonard Tilley
- Succeeded by: John James Fraser

Personal details
- Born: September 28, 1826 Magherafelt, County Londonderry, Ireland (now Northern Ireland
- Died: December 4, 1893 (aged 67) Saint John, New Brunswick
- Party: Liberal-Conservative
- Spouse: Annie E. Jones (m. 1852)
- Occupation: Businessman
- Profession: Politician

John Boyd (September 28, 1826 – December 4, 1893) was a businessman and the eighth Lieutenant Governor of New Brunswick following Canadian Confederation.

Born to a Protestant family in Magherafelt, Ireland, Boyd and his younger brother immigrated to New Brunswick with their mother in 1833, two years after the death of his father. He apprenticed at British and Foreign Dry Goods and eventually became a buyer and then, in 1854, full partner in the firm.

Boyd read and travelled widely overseas and became a popular lecturer at home. Politically he was a supporter of Samuel Leonard Tilley and was frequently his campaign manager after 1854 as well as a supporter of Confederation. He was also an advocate of temperance. He was also a supporter of the New Brunswick Common Schools Act of 1871 and its establishment of a non-sectarian school system. He served on the Saint John, New Brunswick school board beginning in 1871, becoming its chairman in 1874.

Boyd was appointed to the Senate of Canada as a Liberal-Conservative (supporter of Sir John A. Macdonald) on February 11, 1880 and then to the position of lieutenant governor of New Brunswick on September 21, 1893 but served only a few months until his death on December 4, 1893.
