= Section 60 of the Constitution Act, 1867 =

Provision of the Constitution of Canada

British North America Act, 1867

Section 60 of the Constitution Act, 1867 (French: Article 60 de la Loi constitutionnelle de 1867) is a provision of the Constitution of Canada, relating to the salaries of the provincial lieutenant governors, who are the formal heads of the provincial governments, representing the monarch.

Although the lieutenant governors are part of the provincial governments, section 60 requires that the federal government pay their salaries. This structure was based on the pre-Confederation colonial constitutions. The lieutenant governors were colonial officers of the British government, who appointed the lieutenant governors and paid their salaries. When Canada was created in 1867, the federal government took over the appointment and payment of the provincial lieutenant governors.

The Constitution Act, 1867 is the constitutional statute which established Canada. Originally named the British North America Act, 1867, the Act continues to be the foundational statute for the Constitution of Canada, although it has been amended many times since 1867. It is now recognised as part of the supreme law of Canada.

== Constitution Act, 1867 ==
The Constitution Act, 1867 is part of the Constitution of Canada and thus part of the supreme law of Canada. The Act sets out the constitutional framework of Canada, including the structure of the federal government and the powers of the federal government and the provinces. It was the product of extensive negotiations between the provinces of British North America at the Charlottetown Conference in 1864, the Quebec Conference in 1864, and the London Conference in 1866. Those conferences were followed by consultations with the British government in 1867. The Act was then enacted by the British Parliament under the name the British North America Act, 1867. In 1982 the Act was brought under full Canadian control through the Patriation of the Constitution, and was renamed the Constitution Act, 1867. Since Patriation, the Act can only be amended in Canada, under the amending formula set out in the Constitution Act, 1982.

== Text of section 60 ==
Section 60 reads:

Salaries of Lieutenant Governors
60 The Salaries of the Lieutenant Governors shall be fixed and provided by the Parliament of Canada.

Section 60 is found in Part V of the Constitution Act, 1867, dealing with provincial constitutions. It has never been amended.

== Legislative history ==
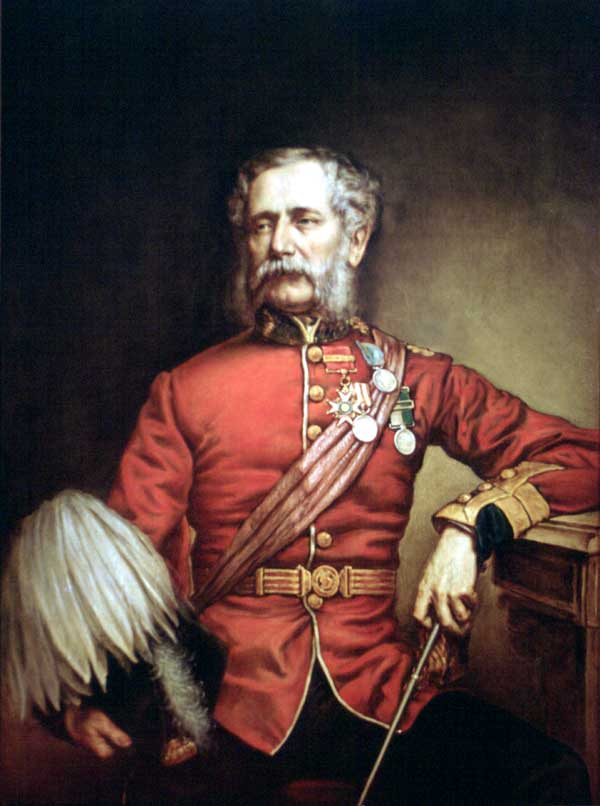
Major-General The Hon. Sir Henry William Stisted, KCB, first lieutenant governor of Ontario

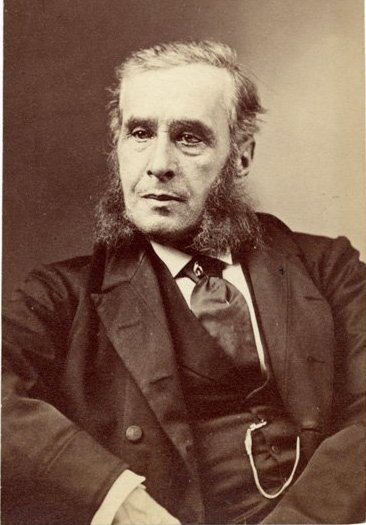
Sir Narcise Belleau, first lieutenant governor of Quebec

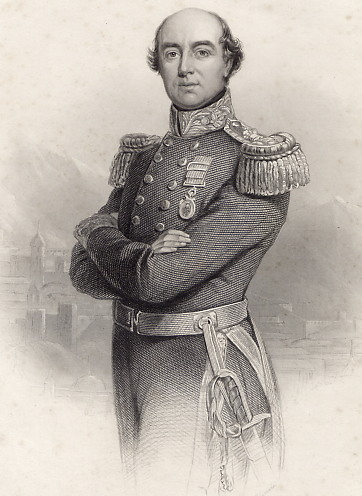
Sir Fenwick Williams, first lieutenant governor of Nova Scotia

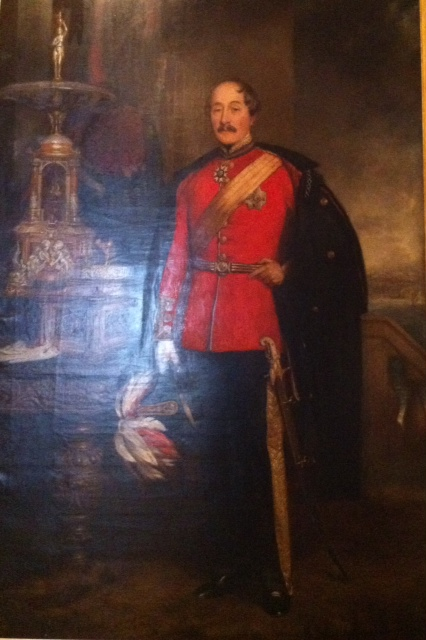
Sir Charles Doyle, KCMG, first lieutenant governor of New Brunswick

The principle that the federal government would pay the salaries of the provincial lieutenant governors was set out in the Quebec Resolutions in 1864, although with the proviso that this arrangement would not prejudice a pending claim that the government of Prince Edward Island was making to the British government about the payment of the salary of their current lieutenant governor. At the London Conference in 1866, the same principle was maintained, without any reference to the Prince Edward Island claim.

After the delegates agreed on the London Resolutions, the four provincial attorneys general prepared a rough draft of a bill based on the resolutions. (Note: The four attorneys general were John A. Macdonald, Canada West; George-Étienne Cartier, Canada East; William Alexander Henry, Nova Scotia; and Charles Fisher, New Brunswick.) That draft provided that the federal Parliament would have the authority to enact laws to "fix and provide" for the salaries of the governors, and also provided that each governor would continue to "receive the same pay and allowances as they shall be then severally receiving".

The initial draft prepared by the British drafter took the power to fix and provide the salaries out of the general list of legislative powers and made it a separate clause (referred to as "superintendents" in the draft). The third draft of the bill continued the requirement, using the wording eventually adopted (now referring once more to "lieutenant governors"), but this clause was omitted from the fourth draft. The clause reappeared in the fifth draft, in the wording eventually adopted in the act.

== Purpose and interpretation ==
Prior to Confederation, the British government paid the salaries of the colonial governors, who were usually part of either the Foreign Office or the Colonial Service.

In 1868, the Parliament of Canada set the salaries for the four lieutenant governors, in the Civil List Act. The lieutenant governors of Ontario and Quebec were each paid $8,000 annually, while the lieutenant governors of Nova Scotia and New Brunswick were each paid $7,000 annually.

Salaries are now paid by the federal government under the authority of the Salaries Act. As of 2023, each lieutenant governor was paid $169,895.

Although the salaries are paid by the federal government, the provinces are generally responsible for the costs of supporting the office of lieutenant governor, such as office space and staff.

== Related provisions of the Constitution Act, 1867 ==
Section 105 of the Act provides that the federal government is to pay the salary of the Governor General of Canada.
