= Jeremiah Smith Boies De Veber =

Canadian politician and businessman (1829–1908)

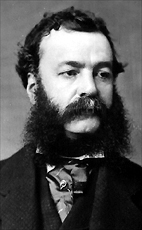

Member of Parliament for Saint John
- In office 1873–1878
- Preceded by: Samuel Leonard Tilley
- Succeeded by: Samuel Leonard Tilley

32nd Mayor of Saint John, New Brunswick
- In office 1885–1887
- Preceded by: J. Mcgregor Grant
- Succeeded by: Henry J. Thorne

Personal details
- Born: November 7, 1829 Saint John, New Brunswick
- Died: June 18, 1908 (aged 78) Saint John, New Brunswick
- Party: Liberal Party of Canada
- Profession: businessman

Jeremiah Smith Boies De Veber (November 7, 1829 – June 18, 1908) was a Canadian politician and businessman.

He was born in Saint John, New Brunswick, Canada. The son of L.H. De Veber, he was educated in Saint John and entered his father's mercantile firm. De Veber married Elizabeth Isley in 1856. He was a director of the Bank of New Brunswick and the Rivière-du-Loop Railway.

He was elected to the House of Commons of Canada on December 1, 1873, as a Member of the Liberal Party of Canada to represent the riding of the City of St. John and re-elected on January 22, 1874, and defeated on September 17, 1878. He was a member of the Liberal Party caucus from December 1, 1873, to August 16, 1878.

De Veber was also mayor of Saint John from 1885 to 1887 and served as treasurer for Saint John County from 1887 to 1908.
