= Conrad J. Osman =

Canadian politician

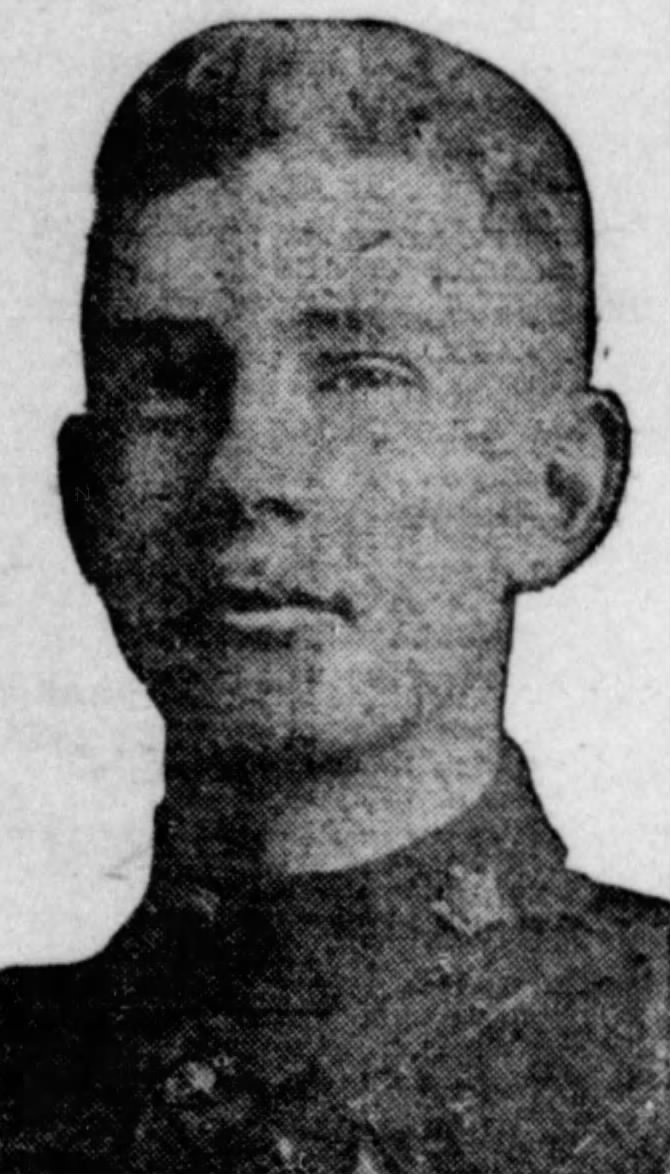
- Osman, pictured in a 1927 newspaper

Member of the Legislative Assembly of New Brunswick
- In office 1927–1930
- Constituency: Albert

Personal details
- Born: September 5, 1897 Hillsborough, New Brunswick, Canada
- Died: September 11, 1948 (aged 52)
- Party: Conservative Party of New Brunswick
- Spouse: Gladys Marie King
- Occupation: Manufacturing director

Conrad Joseph Osman (September 5, 1897 – September 11, 1948) was a Canadian politician. He served in the Legislative Assembly of New Brunswick as member of the Albert party representing Albert County from 1927 to 1930.
