= Ezekiel McLeod =

Canadian politician

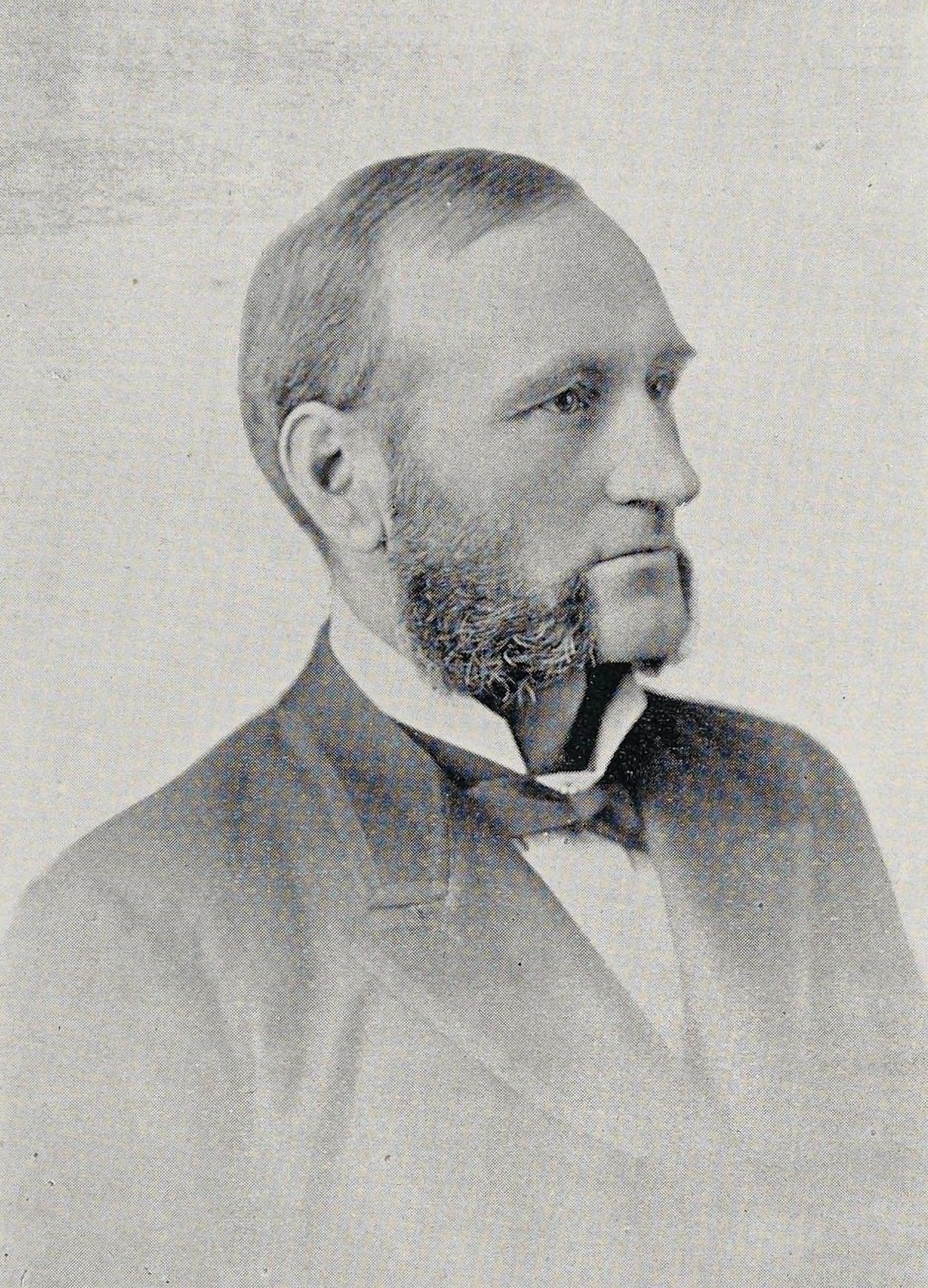
McLeod c. 1894

Ezekiel McLeod, QC (October 29, 1840 – June 11, 1920) was a lawyer, judge and political figure in New Brunswick, Canada. He represented the city of St. John in the Legislative Assembly of New Brunswick from 1882 to 1886 and the City of St. John in the House of Commons of Canada from 1891 to 1896 as a Conservative member.

He was born in Cardwell, New Brunswick, the son of John McLeod and Mary McCready. He received an LL.B from Harvard University in 1867 and was called to the bar the following year. McLeod served as attorney general in the province's executive council from 1882 to 1883. In 1882, he was named Queen's Counsel. He ran unsuccessfully for a seat in the provincial assembly in 1886. McLeod was Chief Justice of New Brunswick from 1914 to 1917.

In June 1914, McLeod was one of the three judges appointed to conduct the Commission of Inquiry into the sinking of the Canadian Pacific steamship Empress of Ireland, which resulted in the loss of 1,012 lives.

Legal offices
Preceded by Frederick E. Barker	Chief Justice of New Brunswick; 1914–1917	Succeeded by J. Douglas Hazen
