= William Pugsley =

Premier and Lieutenant Governor of New Brunswick (1850–1925)

The Honourable William Pugsley PC KC
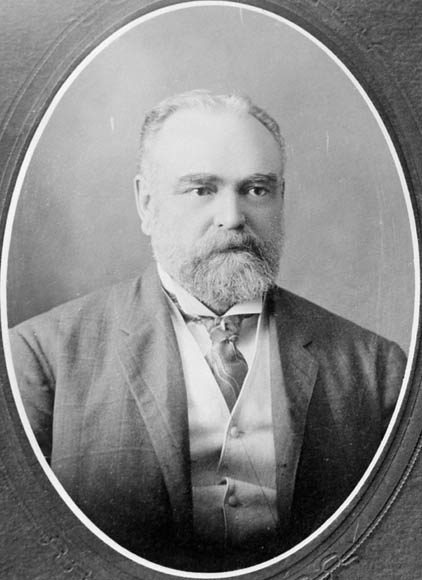
- Hon. William Pugsley

11th Premier of New Brunswick
- In office March 6, 1907 – May 31, 1907
- Monarch: Edward VII
- Lieutenant Governor: Lemuel J. Tweedie
- Preceded by: Lemuel J. Tweedie
- Succeeded by: Clifford W. Robinson

15th Lieutenant Governor of New Brunswick
- In office November 6, 1917 – February 28, 1923
- Monarch: George V
- Governors General: The Duke of Devonshire; The Lord Byng of Vimy
- Premier: Walter E. Foster; Peter J. Veniot
- Preceded by: Gilbert Ganong
- Succeeded by: William Frederick Todd

MLA for Kings
- In office July 4, 1885 – October 22, 1892 Serving with Finnemore E. Morton, Albert Scott White, Gabriel Flewelling, George L. Taylor
- Preceded by: Edwin Arnold Vail
- Succeeded by: George G. Scovil
- In office February 18, 1899 – March 3, 1908 Serving with Albert Scott White, George G. Scovil, Ora P. King
- Preceded by: George William Fowler
- Succeeded by: James Alexander Murray

Member of the Canadian Parliament for City and County of St. John
- In office September 18, 1907 – September 21, 1911
- Preceded by: Alfred Augustus Stockton
- Succeeded by: John Waterhouse Daniel

Member of the Canadian Parliament for City of St. John
- In office September 21, 1911 – November 6, 1917
- Preceded by: John Waterhouse Daniel
- Succeeded by: District was abolished in 1914

Personal details
- Born: September 27, 1850 Sussex, New Brunswick, British North America
- Died: March 3, 1925 (aged 74) Toronto, Ontario, Canada
- Party: Liberal
- Spouses: Frances Jane Parks (m. 1876; died 1914) Gertrude Macdonald (m. 1915)
- Children: 3 sons and 2 daughters
- Education: University of New Brunswick
- Occupation: Lawyer, businessman
- Profession: Politician

William Pugsley PC KC (September 27, 1850 – March 3, 1925) was a politician and lawyer in New Brunswick, Canada.

== Biography ==
He was born in Sussex, New Brunswick, the son of William Pugsley, of United Empire Loyalist descent, and Frances Jane Hayward. He was educated at the University of New Brunswick. He studied mathematics, classics, and English earning numerous scholarships. In his junior year he was the gold medallist of his class. He went on to study law, was admitted to the bar in 1872 and set up practice in Saint John. The University of New Brunswick awarded him a BCL in 1879 and would confer honorary degrees of DCL in 1884 and LL.D in 1918. Pugsley was created a QC on 4 February 1891.

Pugsley, a Liberal, served as Speaker of the Legislative Assembly of New Brunswick as well as Solicitor-General and Attorney-General before becoming the 11th premier of New Brunswick in 1907.

He resigned in September of that year to become Minister of Public Works in the federal Liberal government of Sir Wilfrid Laurier. He served in that position until the government's defeat in the 1911 federal election, but remained as a Member of Parliament (MP) until 1917 when he was appointed the 15th lieutenant governor of New Brunswick. When his term ended in 1923, he was appointed to a federal position in charge of settling war claims, and held that position until his death. Pugsley was staying at King Edward Hotel when he fell ill and died of pneumonia in Toronto in 1925. He was buried in the Fernhill Cemetery in Saint John, New Brunswick.

== Electoral record ==
By-election on 18 September 1907 On Mr. Stockton's death, 15 March 1907
Party	Candidate	Votes
Liberal	William Pugsley	acclaimed

1908 Canadian federal election: City and County of St. John
Party	Candidate	Votes
Liberal	William Pugsley	5,582
Conservative	Alexander William MacRae	5,086
