= John Waterhouse Daniel =

Canadian politician (1845–1933)

The Hon. John Waterhouse Daniel

John Waterhouse Daniel (January 27, 1845 – January 11, 1933) was a Canadian physician and Conservative politician. Born in St. Stephen, New Brunswick, Daniel attended the New Kingswood College in Bath, Somerset, England, taking further education in London and then in New York. Daniel served in the United States Army for a year and a half, afterwards which he returned to England and became a member of the Royal College of Surgeons.

On October 15, 1890, Daniel married Jesse Porteous Ennis. They had no children, and Ennis died in 1921. Daniel served as a surgeon lieutenant-colonel in New Brunswick. In 1881, the Provincial Government sent him to St. Croix to treat a smallpox outbreak, which he did within six weeks. After a three-year term as an Alderman in Saint John, New Brunswick, he was elected Mayor, a post he held from 1900 to 1902.

Elected to the House of Commons four times, Daniel represented Saint John federally from 1904 to 1911. Less than a month after his final election in 1911, Daniel resigned, triggering a by-election which John Douglas Hazen won by acclamation. In 1912 Daniel was appointed to the Senate of Canada. On January 11, 1933, Daniel died in his Saint John home at the age of 87 due to complications from influenza.

1911 Canadian federal election: City and County of St. John
Party	Candidate	Votes
Conservative	John Waterhouse Daniel	5,491
Liberal	James Lowell	5,381

Parliament of Canada
Preceded by William Pugsley	Member of Parliament from City and County of St. John; 1911	Succeeded by John Douglas Hazen
Preceded by Andrew George Blair	Member of Parliament from City of St. John; 1904–1911	Succeeded by William Pugsley
