= John Valentine Ellis =

Canadian politician (1835–1913)

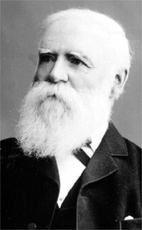
John Ellis

John Valentine Ellis (14 February 1835 – 10 July 1913) was a Canadian journalist and parliamentarian. He was first elected to the House of Commons of Canada in the 1887 general election as a Liberal Member of Parliament representing the New Brunswick electoral district of City of St. John. Although defeated in 1891, he was re-elected in the 1896 election. On 3 September 1900, he was appointed to the Senate of Canada on the recommendation of Sir Wilfrid Laurier. He represented the senatorial division of Saint John, New Brunswick until his death in Saint John on 10 July 1913.

Ellis was a leading Canadian Freemason. He took part in the creation the Grand Lodge of New Brunswick in 1867 and was its Grand Master 1872–1874 and 1884–1886. He was also the Supreme Grand Master of the Masonic Knights Templar of Canada during 1899–1901 and the Sovereign Grand Commander of Scottish Rite for the Dominion of Canada. He was also a provincial leader in Capitular Masonry, Cryptic Rite and the Royal Order of Scotland.
