= Everett Newcomb =

Canadian politician (1895–1985)

Member of the Legislative Assembly of New Brunswick
- In office 1952–1967
- Constituency: Albert

Personal details
- Born: November 16, 1895 Memel, New Brunswick
- Died: March 19, 1985 (aged 89) Moncton, New Brunswick
- Party: Progressive Conservative Party of New Brunswick
- Spouse(s): Arvilla Martha Smith; Edna Joyce Hopper
- Education: Shepody, New Brunswick
- Occupation: farmer

Everett Evans Newcomb (November 16, 1895 – March 19, 1985) was a Canadian politician. He served in the Legislative Assembly of New Brunswick as member of the Progressive Conservative party from 1952 to 1967.
