= Joseph Donald =

Canadian politician, mariner, and farmer

Joseph Donald (October 22, 1806 – February 25, 1900) was a Canadian mariner, farmer and political figure in New Brunswick. He represented Charlotte County in the Legislative Assembly of New Brunswick from 1870 to 1874.

He was born in Sunderland Barracks, England but raised in Workington, Cumberland, England and was educated there. Donald came to Canada in 1826. In 1829, he married Elizabeth Mary Thornton. He ran unsuccessfully for a seat in the provincial assembly four times before being elected.
