= Antoine Girouard =

Canadian politician

- Born: April 25, 1836; Sainte-Marie-de-Kent; New Brunswick, Canada
- Died: June 7, 1904 (aged 68); New Brunswick, Canada
- Education: Public school
- Occupations: Teacher, trader
- Political party: Conservative
- Spouse: Isabella Caisie
- Children: 9 children
- Parent(s): Marin Girouard & Suzanne Doucett

Antoine Girouard (April 25, 1836 – June 7, 1904) was a political figure in New Brunswick of Acadian origin. He represented Kent County from 1870 to 1874 in the Legislative Assembly of New Brunswick as a Conservative member.

He was born and educated in Sainte-Marie-de-Kent, New Brunswick. Girouard was a justice of the peace. In 1856, he married Isabella Caisie.
