= Douglas Hazen =

Canadian politician

The Honourable Sir John Douglas Hazen PC KCMG
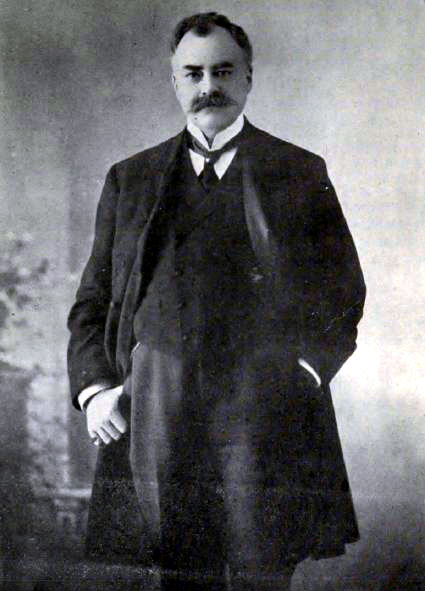
- Sir Douglas Hazen

13th Premier of New Brunswick
- In office 24 March 1908 – 10 October 1911
- Monarchs: Edward VII; George V
- Lieutenant Governor: Lemuel John Tweedie
- Preceded by: Clifford W. Robinson
- Succeeded by: James K. Flemming

MLA for Sunbury
- In office 18 February 1899 – 10 October 1911 Serving with Parker Glasier
- Preceded by: David Morrow
- Succeeded by: George A. Perley

Member of the Canadian Parliament for City and County of St. John
- In office 5 March 1891 – 23 June 1896 Serving with Charles N. Skinner, John A. Chesley
- Preceded by: Charles Nelson Skinner
- Succeeded by: John Alexander Chesley
- In office 27 October 1911 – 11 October 1917
- Preceded by: John Waterhouse Daniel
- Succeeded by: District was abolished in 1914

Mayor of Fredericton, New Brunswick
- In office 1888–1889

Administrator of New Brunswick
- In office 31 October 1917 – 6 November 1917
- Preceded by: William Pugsley
- Succeeded by: William Frederick Todd

Personal details
- Born: 5 June 1860 Oromocto, New Brunswick, British North America
- Died: 27 December 1937 (aged 77) Saint John, New Brunswick, Canada
- Party: Conservative
- Spouse: Ada C. Tibbits (m. 1884)
- Children: Douglas King, James Murray, Kate Elizabeth, Frances Edith and Ada Althea
- Education: University of New Brunswick
- Occupation: Lawyer, judge
- Profession: Politician

Military service
- Years of service: 1880-1898
- Rank: Paymaster
- Unit: 5th Company 71st York Battalion of Infantry and 3rd Battalion New Brunswick Regiment

Sir John Douglas Hazen, PC, KCMG (5 June 1860 – 27 December 1937) was a politician in New Brunswick, Canada.

== Biography ==
Known by his second name, Douglas, he entered politics in 1885 when he was elected as an alderman for Fredericton City Council. He became mayor in 1888.

Hazen was elected to the House of Commons of Canada as a Conservative candidate in the 1891 federal election. He lost his seat in the 1896 election that defeated the Conservatives and brought Wilfrid Laurier's Liberals to power.

He was elected to the Legislative Assembly of New Brunswick in 1899, and became leader of the opposition. Hazen rebuilt the Conservative Party which had been out of power since 1883. He led the party into government in the 1908 provincial election.

As premier, Hazen fought political corruption and attempts by the federal government to reduce the Maritime provinces' representation in the federal House of Commons.

Douglas Hazen left provincial politics in 1911 to become federal Minister of Marine and Fisheries and Minister of the Naval Service in the government of Sir Robert Borden. During the First World War, he served in the Imperial War Cabinet. Hazen left politics in October 1917 to become Chief Justice of New Brunswick.

For his years of service to The Crown and to Canada, in 1918 Douglas Hazen was made a Knight Commander of the Order of St Michael and St George by King George V. On 11 November 1923 (Armistice Day), he gave the dedicatory address at the unveiling of the Fredericton Cenotaph in Fredericton.

Hazen died in 1937 at age seventy-seven and was interred in the Fernhill Cemetery in Saint John, New Brunswick. Sir Douglas Hazen Park in Oromocto, New Brunswick and Sir Douglas Hazen Hall at the University of New Brunswick, Saint John are named in his honour.

Hazen was the father of King Hazen.

By-election on 27 October 1911 On Mr. Daniel's resignation, 17 October 1911
Party	Candidate	Votes
Conservative	J.D. Hazen	acclaimed

== Electoral record ==
1891 Canadian federal election: City and County of St. John
Party	Candidate	Votes	%	Elected
Conservative	John Douglas Hazen	4,824	–	✓
Liberal	C.N. Skinner	4,448	–	✓
Liberal	Charles Wesley Weldon	3,832	–	
Unknown	T.A. Rankine	3,503	–	

1896 Canadian federal election: City and County of St. John
Party	Candidate	Votes	%	Elected
Liberal	Joseph John Tucker	3,924	–	✓
Conservative	John Douglas Hazen	3,733	–	✓
Independent	D.J. McLaughlin	1,495	–	

Legal offices
Preceded by Ezekiel McLeod	Chief Justice of New Brunswick; 1917–1935	Succeeded by John B. M. Baxter
