= Samuel Leonard Tilley =

Canadian Father of Confederation (1818–1896)

The Honourable Sir Samuel Leonard Tilley PC KCMG CB
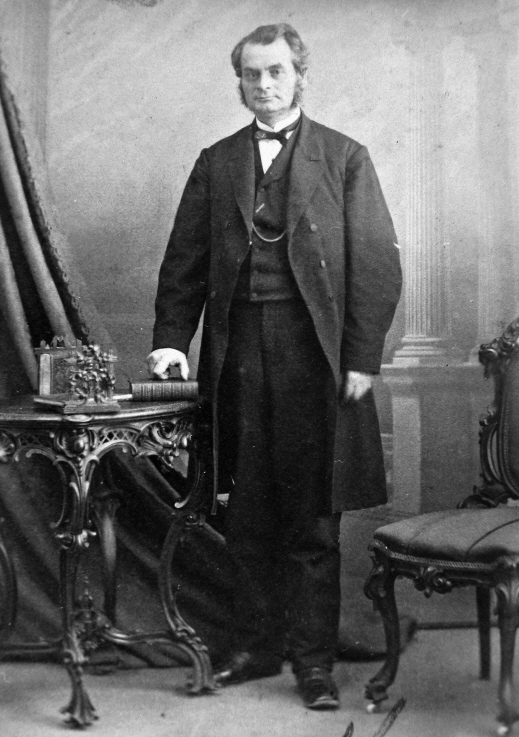
- Tilley in 1864

4th & 7th Lieutenant Governor of New Brunswick
- In office 11 November 1885 – 21 September 1893
- Monarch: Victoria
- Premier: Andrew George Blair
- Preceded by: Robert Duncan Wilmot
- Succeeded by: John Boyd
- In office 15 November 1873 – 11 July 1878
- Monarch: Victoria
- Premier: George Edwin King; John James Fraser
- Preceded by: Lemuel Allan Wilmot
- Succeeded by: Edward Barron Chandler

Premier of the Colony of New Brunswick
- In office 19 March 1861 – 21 September 1865
- Monarch: Victoria
- Governor: John Manners-Sutton; Arthur Hamilton-Gordon
- Preceded by: Charles Fisher
- Succeeded by: Albert James Smith

Personal details
- Born: 8 May 1818 Gagetown, New Brunswick
- Died: 25 June 1896 (aged 78) Saint John, New Brunswick
- Party: Conservative
- Spouses: Julia Hanford (1843–1862, her death; Alice Chipman (1867–1896, his death)
- Children: 10, including Leonard Percy de Wolfe Tilley

Sir Samuel Leonard Tilley PC KCMG CB (May 8, 1818 – June 25, 1896) was a Canadian politician and one of the Fathers of Confederation. Tilley was descended from United Empire Loyalists on both sides of his family. As a pharmacist, he went into business as a druggist.

== Early life ==
Sir Samuel Leonard Tilley was born in Gagetown, New Brunswick, on May 8, 1818, to a storekeeper named Thomas Morgan Tilley, and Susan Ann Peters, both of whom had descended from American loyalists.

== Political career ==
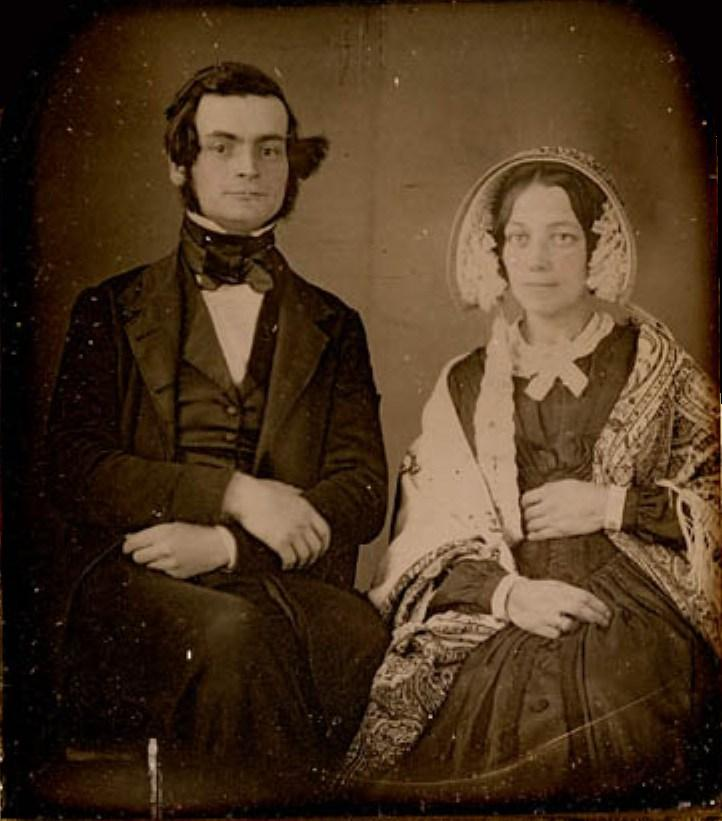
Sir Samuel Leonard Tilley and his first wife Julia Ann Hanford, circa 1843

Samuel Leonard Tilley entered politics as an activist in the temperance movement. As a result of the 1848 recession, caused in part by Britain's economic policies, he became an advocate for responsible government. Tilley later joined the New Brunswick Colonial Association, which advocated for the colony's own control over its public expenses, the establishment of a public school system, government control of public works, and "honest government" in general.

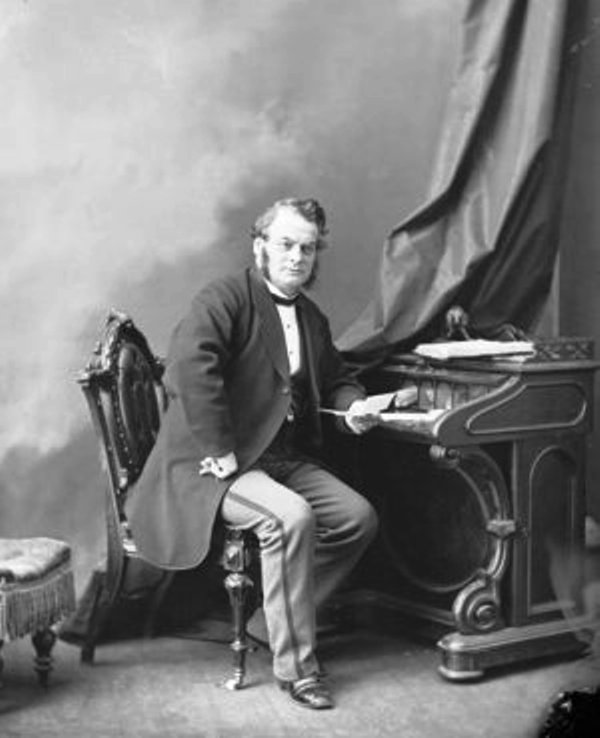
Sir Samuel Leonard Tilley, 1869

First elected to the New Brunswick Assembly as a Liberal in 1850, he sat in opposition until the 1854 election swept the reformers to power. Tilley became Provincial Secretary in the government of Charles Fisher. In 1855 he persuaded the assembly to pass a prohibition law, but that proved a failure and was later repealed.

He attended each of the Charlottetown, London, and Quebec City Conferences as a supporter of Canadian Confederation. He served as premier of the colony of New Brunswick from 1861 until his government was defeated in the election of 1865. As premier, he supported the New Brunswick's entry into Confederation and the construction of an intercolonial railway.

A common tale states that Tilley was the originator of the word "Dominion" in Canada's name. The Fathers of Confederation had been discussing what to prefix Canada with, Kingdom of Canada being Macdonald's preference. During morning devotions, Tilley read Psalm 72:8, which states "He shall have dominion also from sea to sea, and from the river unto the ends of the earth", and presented this inspiration to the others, being as their ambition was to stretch the new nation to the Pacific Ocean and from the St Lawrence River to the North Pole. "Dominion" had been used before, but Tilley pushed hard for it to be adopted in reference to Canada, despite Macdonald's preference.

The term led to the naming of the July 1 national holiday; however, the reference to a unique Canadian historical development was discarded in 1982 when "Canada Day", which had already been in use by most Canadians, was made official by an act of Parliament. In French, the date had long been known as la fête nationale (national feast or national birthday), a date which is often now applied to June 24 in Quebec, a date officially known as Saint-Jean-Baptiste Day.

Tilley entered federal politics with Confederation in 1867 and served in the federal cabinet as Minister of Customs. He became Minister of Finance in 1873 and served until the defeat of the government later that year. He was appointed the fourth Lieutenant Governor of New Brunswick in 1873 and served until 1878. When Macdonald's Tories returned to power in 1878, Tilley was elected member for Saint John and again became minister of finance; while in that office he introduced protective tariffs which became the basis of Canadian financial policy. He served in cabinet until his retirement from politics in 1885, when he was again appointed the seventh Lieutenant Governor of New Brunswick.

The Sir Leonard Tilley Building was named in his honour. He is interred in the Fernhill Cemetery in Saint John, New Brunswick.

== Personal life ==
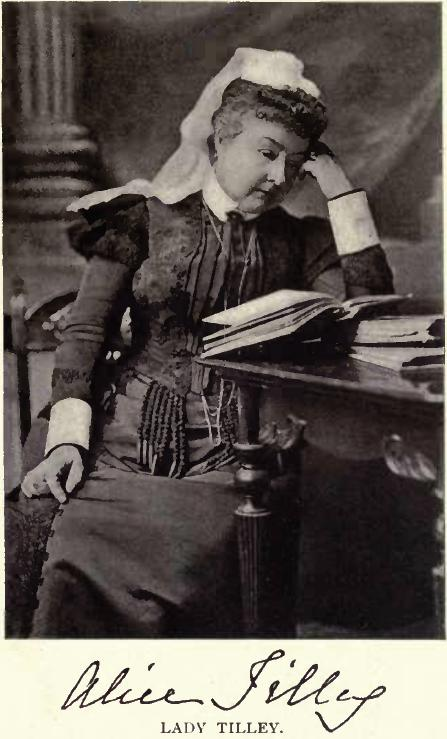
Sir Samuel Leonard Tilley's second wife Lady Alice Tilley by William James Topley

On May 6, 1843, Tilley married Julia Ann Hanford in Saint John, New Brunswick; they had eight children. Hanford died in 1862, leaving Tilley a widower. On October 22, 1867, he married Alice Starr Chipman in St. Stephen, New Brunswick; they had two children, including future New Brunswick Premier Leonard Percy de Wolfe Tilley. Samuel Leonard Tilley died in 1896 on June 25.

Tilley, then-Minister of Customs, married his second wife on October 20, 1867. Alice Starr Chipman was the daughter of ship owner (The Cedars) Zachariah Chipman and his wife Mary Eliza. The couple had two sons Herbert Chipman Tilley, born September 6, 1868, and Leonard Percy DeWolfe Tilley, born May 21, 1870. In July 1884, he and his wife were presented to Her Majesty Queen Victoria, at Osborne, by the Princess Louise. The couple were activists in the temperance movement. During the 13 years the couple lived at Government House, Fredericton no intoxicants were in use at their entertainments. Alice was instrumental in the founding of the Victoria College Hospital at Fredericton, New Brunswick. She helped found the Industrial School for Boys, the Nurses`Home, the Seamen's Mission and the Home for Consumptives at Saint John, New Brunswick. The Chipman homestead in St. Stephen, New Brunswick was donated by the heirs of the estate in 1902 to found the Chipman Memorial Hospital. Alice was a founding member of the National Council of Women and served as President of the St John Local Council of Women.

== Archives ==
There is a Samuel Leonard Tilley fonds at Library and Archives Canada.

== Notes ==
Parliament of Canada
| Preceded by None | Member of Parliament from City of St. John; 1867–1873 | Succeeded by Jeremiah Smith Boies De Veber |
| Preceded by Jeremiah Smith Boies De Veber | Member of Parliament from City of St. John; 1878–1885 | Succeeded by Frederick Eustace Barker |
