= Edward Willis (politician) =

Canadian politician

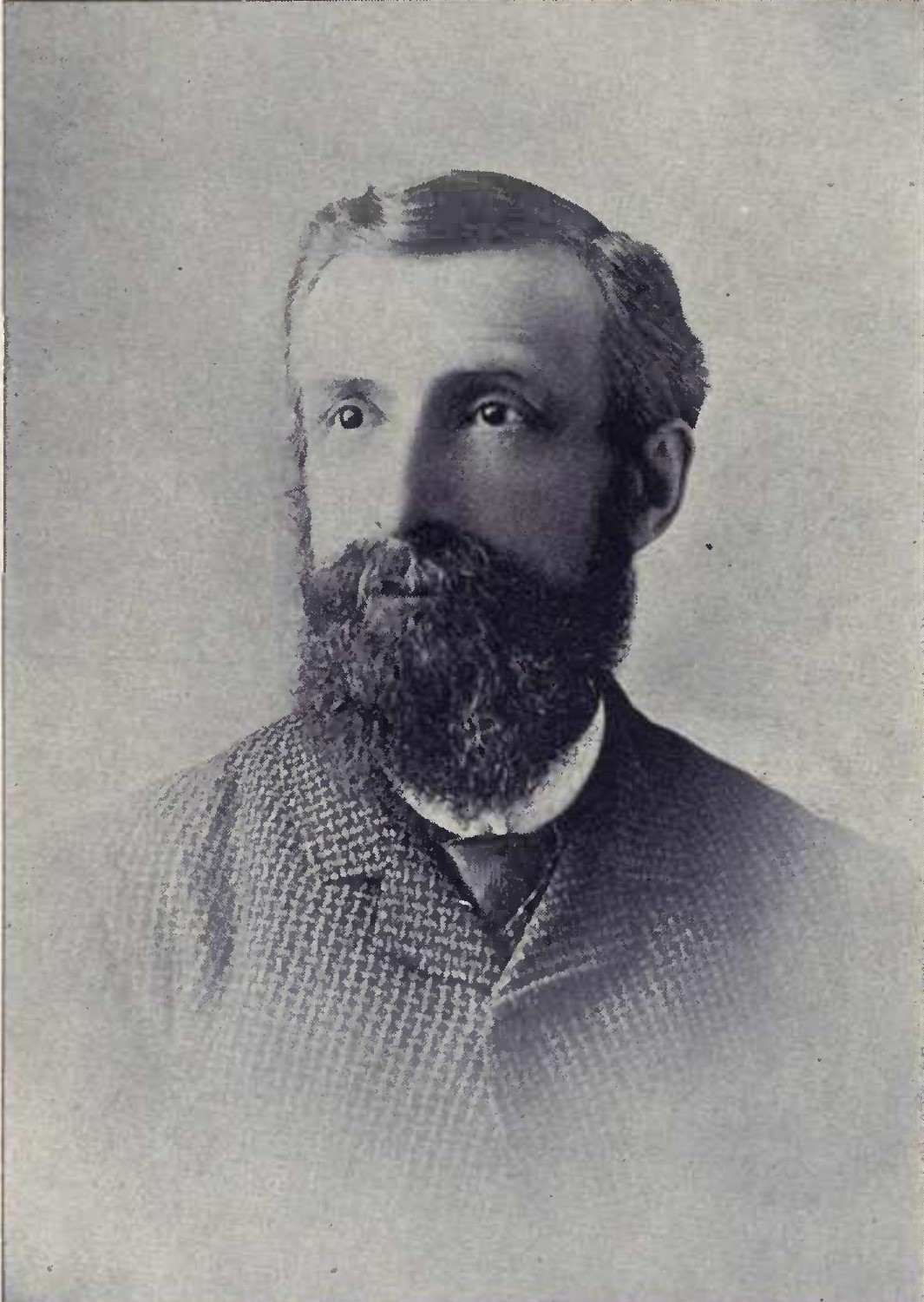
A portrait of Edward Willis, taken from the book The Canadian Album Volume 3 by William Cochrane.

Edward Willis (November 5, 1835 – March 5, 1891) was a journalist and political figure in New Brunswick. He represented St. John County in the Legislative Assembly of New Brunswick from 1870 to 1882.

He was born in Halifax, Nova Scotia, the son of John Willis, an Irish immigrant, was educated there and later moved to Saint John, New Brunswick. In 1857, he helped launch two newspapers, one weekly and one monthly. In 1858, he married Sarah Adams. He became editor of the Saint John Morning News in 1863. He ran unsuccessfully for a seat in the provincial assembly in 1867 but was elected in 1870. Willis served as a member of the Executive Council from 1873 to 1876. He was also a prominent member of the Orange Order. He served as postmaster for Saint John from 1886 until his death there at the age of 55.

His brother John Robert was a teacher and naturalist in Nova Scotia.
