= George Scovil (priest) =

Canadian Anglican priest

George Fred Scovil, D.D. was a Canadian Anglican priest in the 20th Century.

Rigby was educated at the University of King's College and ordained in 1897. After a curacy at Prince William, New Brunswick he was at Saint John, New Brunswick from 1900 to 1918. on the Prince Albert Peninsula. He was Rector of Guelph from 1918 to 1925 and Archdeacon of Wellington, ON from 1925 to 1944.
