= John Hamilton Gray (New Brunswick politician) =

Canadian Father of Confederation (1814–1889)

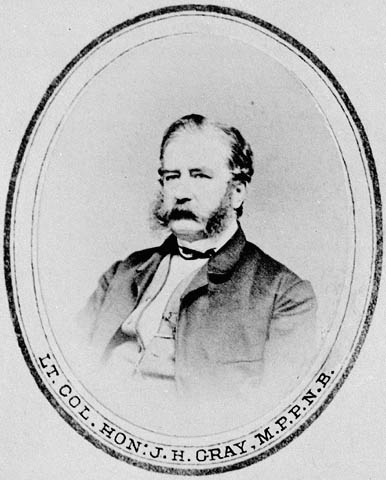

Premier of the Colony of New Brunswick
- In office 1856–1857
- Preceded by: Charles Fisher
- Succeeded by: Charles Fisher

Member of the Canadian Parliament for City and County of St. John
- In office 1867–1872
- Succeeded by: Isaac Burpee

Personal details
- Born: 1814 St. George's, Bermuda
- Died: June 5, 1889 (aged 75) Victoria, British Columbia
- Party: Conservative
- Spouse: Elizabeth (Eliza) Ormond (m. 1845)

John Hamilton Gray, QC (1814 – June 5, 1889) was a politician in the Province of New Brunswick, Canada, a jurist, and one of the Fathers of Confederation. He should not be confused with John Hamilton Gray, a Prince Edward Island politician (and also a Father of Confederation) in the same era.

Gray was born in St. George's, Bermuda, British North America. His father, William, was naval commissary in Bermuda and later served as British consul in Norfolk, Virginia. Gray's grandfather, Joseph Gray, was a United Empire Loyalist from Boston who settled in Halifax, Nova Scotia following the American Revolution. His cousin, Samuel Brownlow Gray (1823–1910), the grandfather of Captain Gerald Hamilton Gray (1883–1953) of the Royal Garrison Artillery and Lieutenant-Colonel Reginald Wentworth Gray of the Prince of Wales's Leinster Regiment (Royal Canadians), was appointed Attorney-General of Bermuda in 1861 and the Chief Justice of Bermuda in 1900.

John Hamilton Gray was educated at King's College in Nova Scotia after which he became a lawyer in Saint John, New Brunswick. He also served as a captain in the New Brunswick Regiment of Yeomanry Cavalry becoming a major in the Queen's New Brunswick Ranger by 1850. In 1854 he became lieutenant-colonel of the regiment.

Politically, Gray was a high Tory Conservative but also a moderate reformer. He joined the New Brunswick Colonial Association after it was founded in 1849. Gray moved a motion calling for a "federal union of the British North American colonies, preparatory to their immediate independence." The motion was defeated but was an anticipation of Canadian Confederation. Gray was elected to the Legislative Assembly of New Brunswick as a supporter of the Colonial Association's platform of reforms in opposition to the Compact government. Lieutenant Governor Edmund Walker Head appointed Gray to the Executive Council causing the reform opposition to collapse and ending Gray's career as a Liberal. He was created a Queen's Counsel In 1853.

Gray became leader of the Conservatives in the Legislative Assembly and found himself leader of the opposition after the 1854 elections, the first held under responsible government, elected a Liberal (or Reform) administration ending "compact" government. In 1855, Lieutenant-Governor John Manners-Sutton dismissed the Reform government over its attempt to institute prohibition and asked Gray to form an administration.

As Premier, Gray led the Conservatives to victory in the June 1856 election on an anti-prohibition platform and repealed the liquor law. However, with the central issue uniting his government now resolved he became unable to command a majority in the legislature and resigned in May 1857.

Gray continued in opposition as a Conservative MLA. He also led committees of inquiry into railway construction and investigated allegations of patronage and corruption but he concluded that the railway was "sound". After 1860, Gray drifted away from his fellow Conservatives and became supportive of Samuel Leonard Tilley's Liberal government but was defeated in the 1861 election for his efforts.

Out of elected politics, Gray returned to his practice as a lawyer and was appointed to an inquiry board on the land question in Prince Edward Island.

Gray became an active supporter of Canadian Confederation and joined Tilley's new Liberal-Conservative Party returning to the legislature in a by-election in 1864. Gray served as a delegate to the Charlottetown Conference only to return to New Brunswick to face growing hostility to the confederation project and lost his seat in the 1865 election that brought the Anti-Confederation Party to power. Gray returned to the legislature in 1866 and served as Speaker. When confederation became a reality, Gray won a seat in the House of Commons.

He did not run for re-election in 1872. He was appointed judge of the Supreme Court of British Columbia and moved west reluctantly. He served on the 1885 Royal Commission on Chinese immigration.

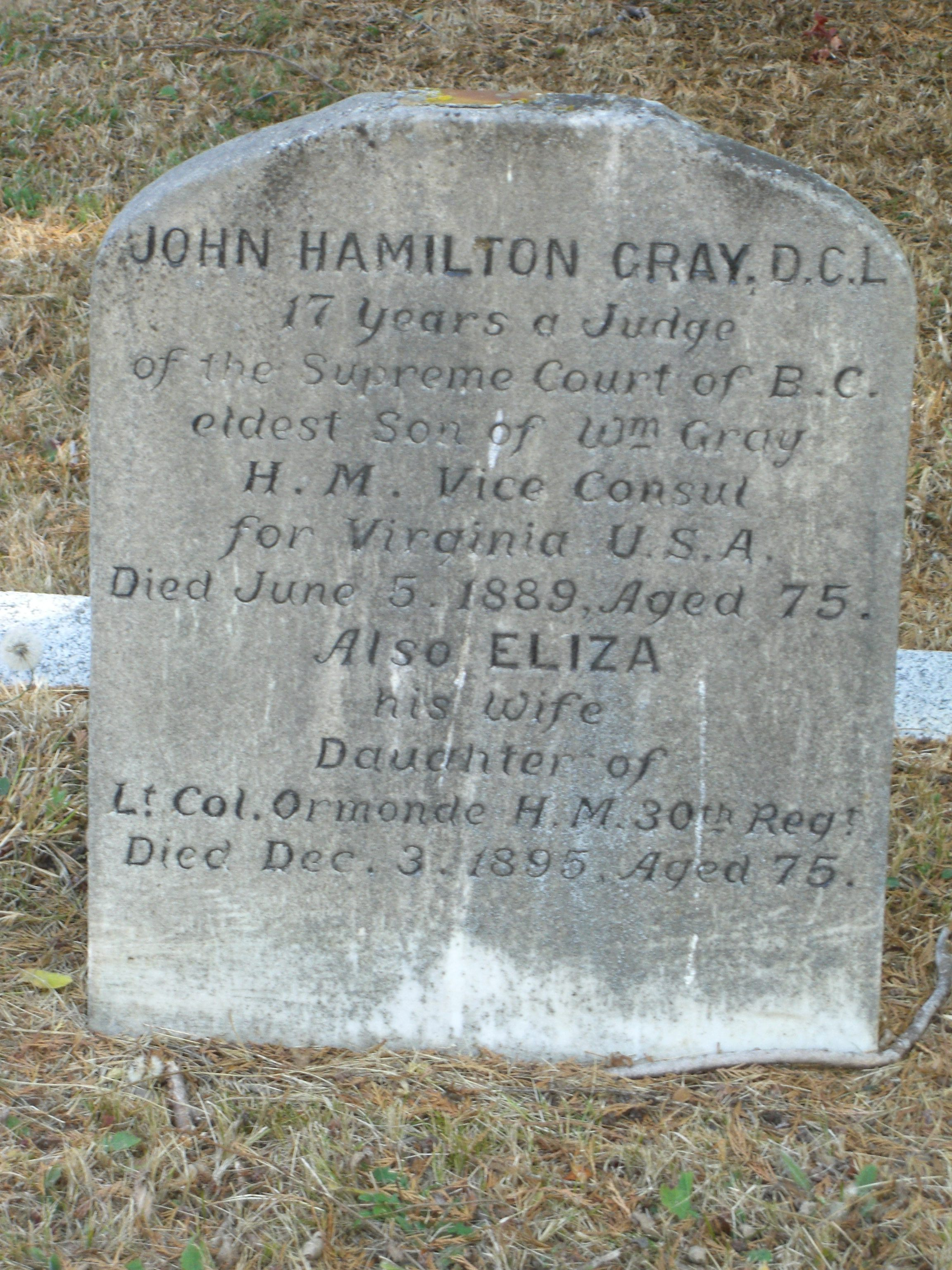
John Hamilton Gray's headstone

On the court, Gray ruled in 1878 that the province's Chinese Tax Act was unconstitutional as its purpose was to "drive the Chinese from the country, thus interfering at once with the authority reserved to the Dominion Parliament as to the regulation of the trade and commerce, the rights of aliens, and the treaties of the empire."

He was a Freemason of Albion Lodge No. 500 in Saint John, New Brunswick, and Civil Service Lodge No. 148 in Ottawa.

John Hamilton Gray died in Victoria, British Columbia and is interred there in the Ross Bay Cemetery. He is the only father of confederation buried west of Ontario.

== Electoral record ==
1867 Canadian federal election: City and County of St. John
Party	Candidate	Votes
Conservative	John Hamilton Gray	acclaimed
Source: Canadian Elections Database

== Recognition and legacy ==
- In 1968, a CN automobile/passenger/railcar ferry entered service carrying the name MV John Hamilton Gray, honouring both Fathers of Confederation.
