= Alexander Wedderburn (businessman) =

Canadian businessman

Alexander Wedderburn (1796–1843) was a Scottish-born Canadian businessman from Aberdeen.
