= Martin B. Palmer =

Canadian politician (1812–1893)

Martin Bent Palmer (December 20, 1812 – February 4, 1893) was a lawyer, judge and political figure in New Brunswick. He represented Albert County in the Legislative Assembly of New Brunswick from 1873 to 1874.

He was born in Dorchester, New Brunswick, the son of Philip Palmer and Sarah Ayer, and educated in Sackville. He studied law with Edward Barron Chandler, was admitted to practice and entered practice with Mr. Chandler. Palmer moved to Hopewell Cape and was named probate judge in 1846. In 1857, he married Rebecca Bennett. In 1873, after the death of his brother Rufus, he resigned his position as judge and was elected to the provincial assembly; Palmer was defeated in the general election that followed.

His brother Acalus Lockwood served in the House of Commons.
