= 1856 New Brunswick general election =

British colonial election in present-day Canada

The 1856 New Brunswick general election was a very close election. The conservative members of Parliament manage to claim 21 seats, to the liberals' 20. Premier Charles Fisher's alliance of Liberal MLAs were ousted from government, and John Hamilton Gray became the new Premier of the colony. The main issue of the election was Prohibition. In 1855, the Liberals had passed a legislation banning alcohol in the colony, following Maine's example. The new administration repealed this act in a special session immediately after forming government.

== Results ==
New Brunswick general election, 1856
Party	Leader	Seats
Opposition	John Hamilton Gray	21
Government (Liberals)	Charles Fisher	20
