= Michael Whalen Maher =

Canadian politician

Michael Whalen Maher (September 23, 1830 – February 22, 1905) was an architect, builder and political figure in New Brunswick. He represented St. John County in the Legislative Assembly of New Brunswick from 1870 to 1874.

He was born and educated in Saint John, New Brunswick, the son of Edward Maher and Catherine Whalen, Irish immigrants. Maher married Mary Green. He served on the city council for Saint John. He ran unsuccessfully for reelection in 1874.
