= Rufus Palmer =

Canadian politician

Rufus Palmer (March 23, 1828 – 1873) was a medical doctor and political figure in New Brunswick. He represented Albert County in the Legislative Assembly of New Brunswick from 1870 to 1873.

He was born in Sackville, New Brunswick, the son of Philip Palmer, who had also served in the provincial assembly. He was educated at the Mount Allison Academy and the University of Glasgow. In 1862, he married Zeliah McAlmon. Palmer died in office in 1873; his brother Martin B. Palmer was elected in his place.
