= Charles Fisher (Canadian politician) =

Canadian Father of Confederation (1808–1880)

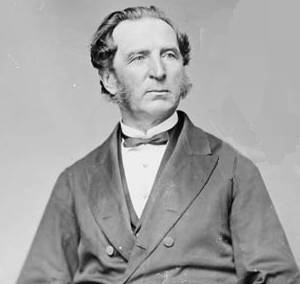
- Fisher in 1868

Premier of the Colony of New Brunswick
- In office 1 June 1857 – 19 March 1861
- Monarch: Victoria
- Governor: John Manners-Sutton
- Preceded by: John Hamilton Gray
- Succeeded by: Samuel Leonard Tilley
- In office 1 November 1854 – May 1856
- Monarch: Victoria
- Governor: John Manners-Sutton
- Preceded by: Position established
- Succeeded by: John Hamilton Gray

Personal details
- Born: 15 August or 16 September 1808 Fredericton, New Brunswick, Canada
- Died: 8 December 1880 (aged 72) Fredericton, New Brunswick, Canada
- Party: Liberal Party
- Children: Mary Ann Susanna Fisher Clara Ariana Alice Fisher Jane Maria Paulette Fraser
- Parent: Peter Fisher (father)

Charles Fisher (15 or 16 August September 1808 – 8 December 1880) was a politician and jurist of New Brunswick, Canada. Fisher was a leading Reformer of his day who headed the first responsible government in New Brunswick from 1854 to 1861.

== Early life ==
Charles Fisher was born in Fredericton, New Brunswick, on either 16 August – 16 September 1808, to parents Peter Fisher and Susanna Williams.

== Career ==
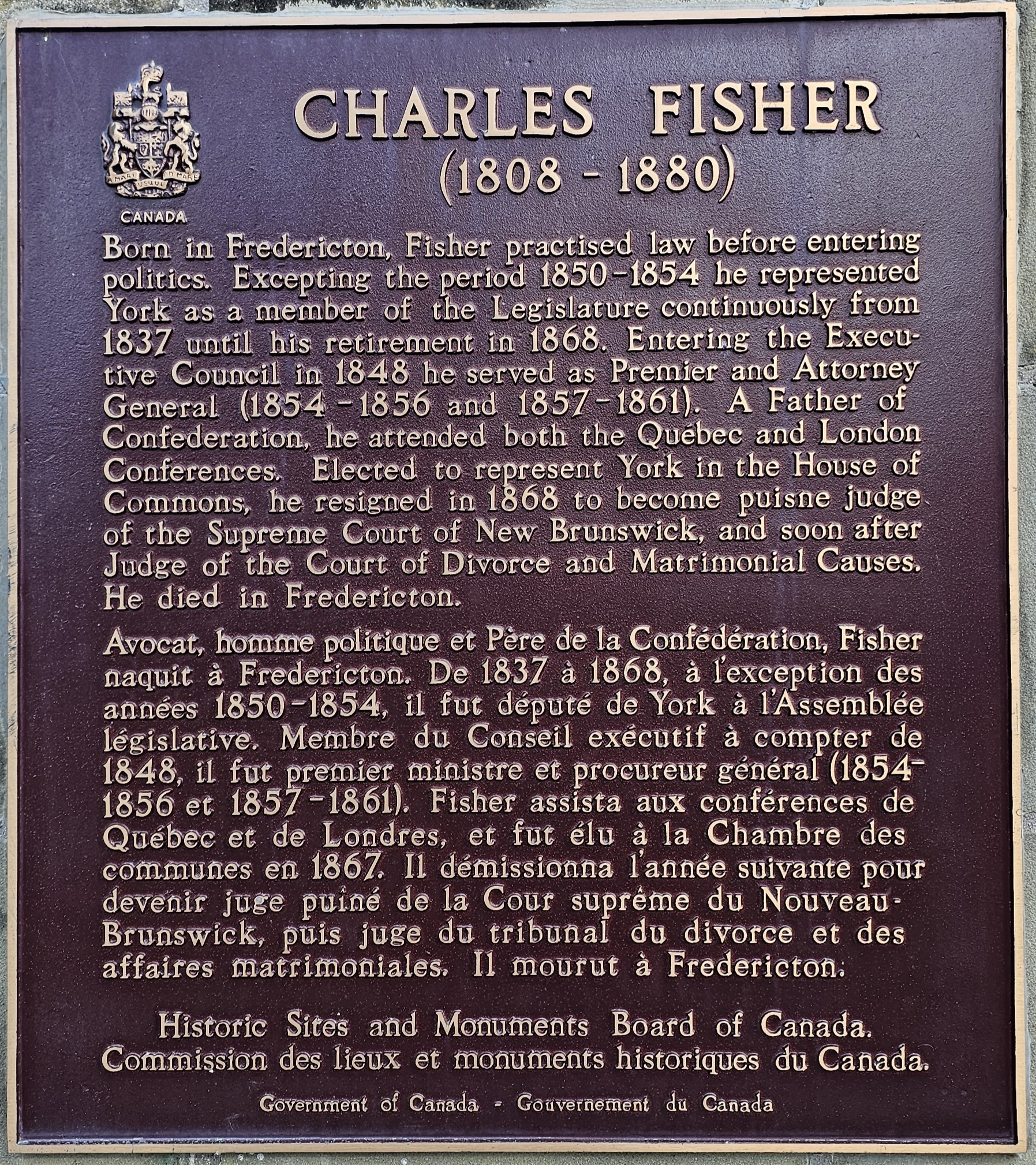
Plaque honoring Fisher on the grounds of the New Brunswick Legislative Building

Fisher was first elected to the colonial assembly in 1837, serving from 1848 to 1850. During this time, Fisher wrote to his friend Joseph Howe about the evil ways of the family compact and on the irresponsible nature of the government and its politics. Fisher would become Leader of the Official Opposition and then Premier and Attorney General in 1854. His government implemented various reforms in education, administration and the electoral system. His government lost power in 1856 when it tried to implement Prohibition which proved unpopular with voters but he returned to power in 1857. His leadership ended in 1861 when he was ousted by fellow reformer Samuel L. Tilley due to a scandal over the leasing of crown lands.

Charles Fisher became a Father of Confederation, participating in the Quebec Conference of 1864 and the London Conference of 1866 that drafted the British North America Act.

He was elected to the House of Commons in 1867 as a Liberal but resigned his seat in 1868 to accept an appointment to the New Brunswick Supreme Court. One of his notable decisions as a judge of the Court was his lone dissent in Dow v Black, a significant constitutional law case dealing with the federal-provincial division of powers. He would have upheld the constitutionality of a provincial statute dealing with municipal taxation, but the majority of the Court held the statute to be unconstitutional. However, his position was upheld on appeal by the Judicial Committee of the Privy Council, at that time the court of last resort for the British Empire, which ruled that the statute was within provincial powers. In another case, Ex parte Renaud, he concurred in the Court's decision upholding the constitutionality of the Common Schools Act of 1871. That decision was also upheld by the Judicial Committee, in Maher v Town Council of Portland.

He declined an appointment to be Chief Justice of New Brunswick, remaining a puisne judge until his death at the age of 72. He was buried in the Forest Hill Cemetery in Fredericton, York County, New Brunswick, Canada.

His daughter, Jane M. Paulette Fisher, married future premier John James Fraser.
