= George G. Scovil =

Canadian politician

George G. Scovil (August 15, 1842 – October 24, 1915) was a merchant and political figure in New Brunswick, Canada. He represented King's County in the Legislative Assembly of New Brunswick from 1892 to 1908 as a Liberal member.

He was born in Springfield, Kings County, New Brunswick, and educated at Kingston. Scovil married Leah Spragg. He owned a general store and was also involved in farming and lumbering. He served on the municipal council.
