= William Henry Tuck =

Chief Justice of New Brunswick (1831–1913)

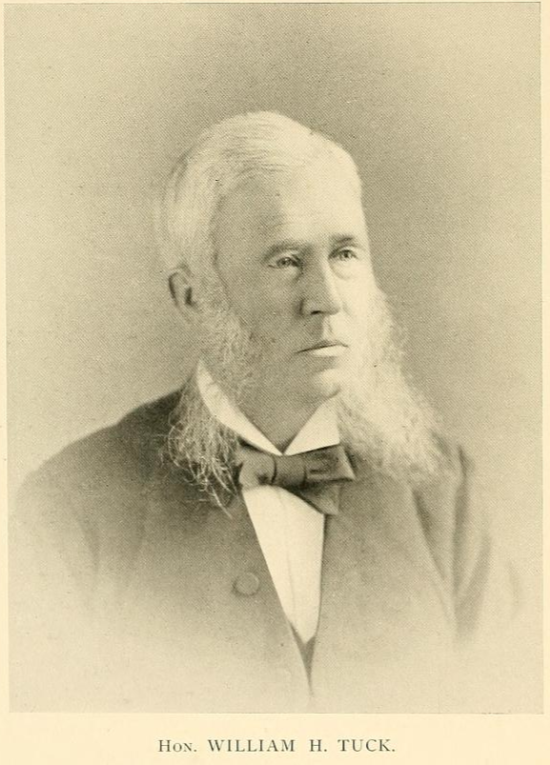

William Henry Tuck (27 February 1831 – 8 April 1913) was a Canadian lawyer and judge. He was described by Andrew George Blair as "undoubtedly the most skilful examiner" at the provincial bar.

Tuck was Chief Justice of New Brunswick from 1896 to 1908. He was also a Judge in the Admiralty.

When Mabel French sought entrance to the New Brunswick bar, she was refused, as legally she was not a person and therefore, not entitled to practise law. Tuck opposed her admission.
