= List of people from Saint John, New Brunswick =

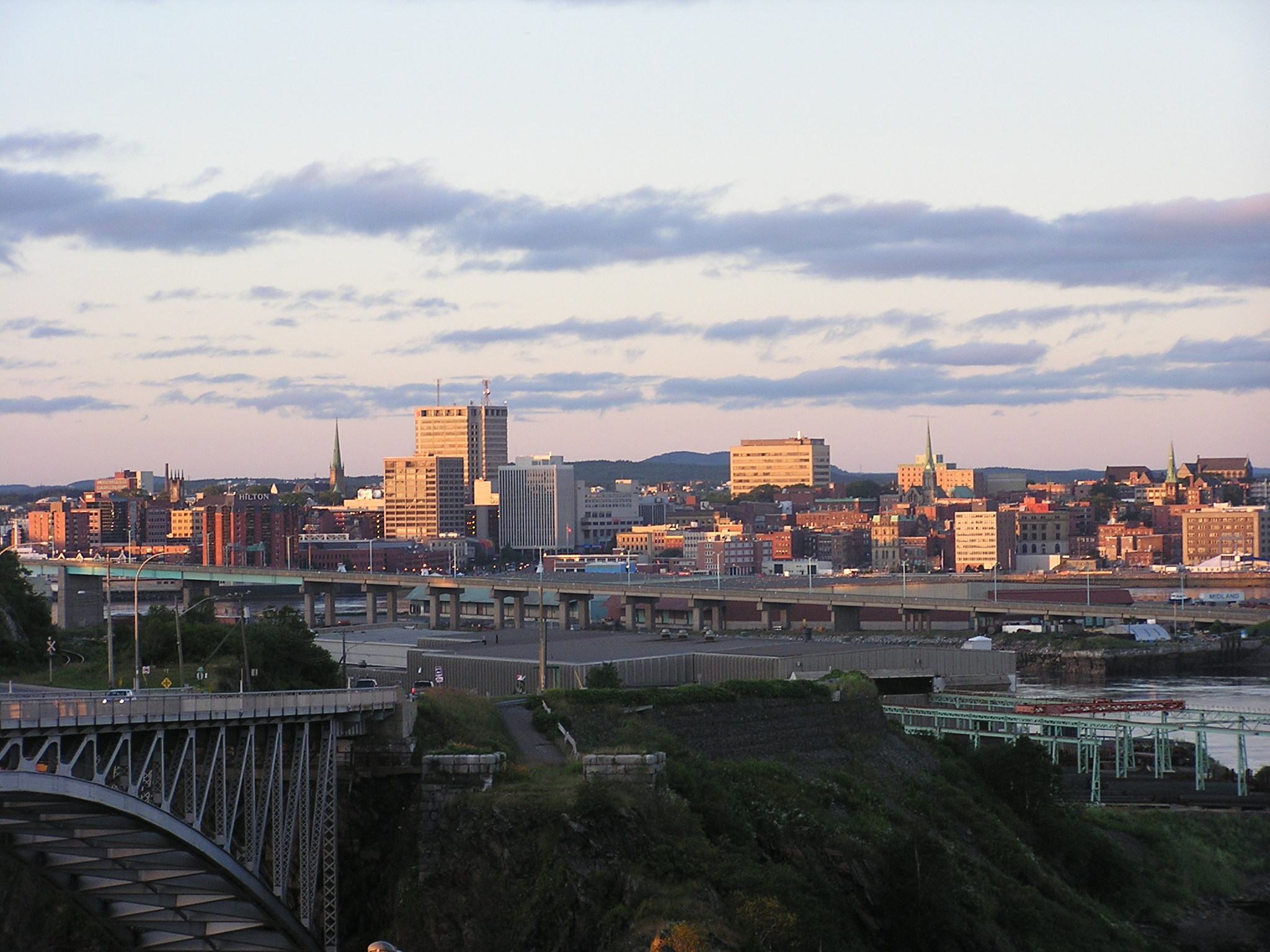
Saint John skyline

The following is a list of notable people who were born or have lived in Saint John, New Brunswick.

== A ==
- John Adams (born 1942) – former Canadian Armed Forces member
- Robert M. Allan (1880–?) – American politician; Los Angeles City Council member
- John Allore (1964–2023) – actor, victims' rights advocate, podcaster, brother of murder victim Theresa Allore
- Aaron Alward (1828–1886) – physician, politician; city councillor, mayor and MLA
- Francis Alexander Anglin (1865–1933) – chief justice of Canada 1924–1933
- Timothy Anglin (1822–1896) – Irish-born journalist, MLA, Speaker of the House of Commons
- Jennifer Armstrong (born 1992) – curler
- Clara Arthur (1858–1929) – American suffragist based in Michigan

== B ==
- Brent Bambury (born 1960) – Canadian Broadcasting Corporation radio and television host
- Blank Banshee (born 1987) – musician
- J. Esmonde Barry (1923–2007) – healthcare activist and political commentator
- Michael Barry (born 1954) – Olympic wrestler
- Patricia Martin Bates (born 1927) – artist, educator
- John Babington Macaulay Baxter (1868–1946) – lawyer, jurist, 19th premier of New Brunswick
- Arthur Belyea (1885–1968) – Olympic rower
- Helen Belyea (1913–1986) – geologist
- Craven Langstroth Betts (1853–1941) – poet, author
- Jared Bezanson (born 1986) – curler
- Andy Bezeau (born 1970) – professional ice hockey player
- Carl Biddiscombe (1924–2000) – set decorator
- Vaughn Blaney (born 1938) – former educator and politician
- Jonathan Bliss (1742–1822) – American-born lawyer, judge, politician; MLA
- John Boyd (1826–1893) – Irish-born businessman, school board chairman, lieutenant governor of New Brunswick
- Jane Boyle (born 1973) – curler
- Miller Brittain (1912–1968) – visual artist
- George Butterfield (born 1939) – businessman, philanthropist
- Mather Byles (1734/35–1814) – Loyalist, clergyman

== C ==
- Laura Calder – writer
- William A. Calvin (1898–1962) – labor union leader
- Robert H. Carlin (1887–1953) – politician, MLA
- Dyson Carter (1910–1996) – scientist, writer, political activist; president of the Canadian-Soviet Friendship Society
- Andrew Case (born 1993) – baseball pitcher
- Charlie Cavanagh (born 2000) – former boxer
- Kevin Chase (born 1976) – wrestler, singer-songwriter
- John Alexander Chesley (1837–1922) – businessman, politician; city councillor, mayor, member of Canadian Parliament
- Ward Chipman Jr. (1787–1851) – lawyer, judge, pre-Confederation politician
- Gordie Clark (born 1952) – Scottish-born former ice hockey player for the Boston Bruins and the Cincinnati Stingers
- Robert J. Coffey (1842–1901) – soldier
- Charles Collingwood (born 1943) – British actor
- Gerard Collins (born 1957) – painter
- Anne Compton (born 1947) – poet, anthologist
- Eddie Connolly (1876–1936) – boxer
- Thomas-Louis Connolly (1814–1876) – bishop of Saint John
- Stompin' Tom Connors (1936–2013) – country and folk singer-songwriter
- Jane Coop (born 1950) – pianist
- Paul Corkum (born 1943) – physicist
- Ivan Court – former mayor of Saint John
- William Cox (1921–2008) – lawyer
- Jordon Craft (born 1993) – curler
- Maxwell Cummings (1898–2001) – real estate builder
- Nathan Cummings (1896–1985) – businessman
- Louis Cunningham (1900–1954) – author
- Louis Cuppens (1944–2022) – Royal Canadian Air Force officer, NORAD deputy commander
- Richard Currie (born 1937) – businessman

== D ==
- William H. Dabney (1934–2012) – colonel in the United States Marine Corps
- Tom Daly (1891–1946) – Major League Baseball player and coach
- John Waterhouse Daniel (1845–1933) – physician, politician; mayor of Saint John, member of Canadian Parliament and Senator
- Don Darling – former mayor of Saint John
- Joseph A. Day (born 1945) – former politician, senator
- James De Mille (1833–1880) – novelist, professor at Dalhousie University
- Jeremiah Smith Boies De Veber (1829–1908) – businessman, politician; mayor of Saint John, member of Canadian Parliament
- James Dever (1825–1904) – Irish-born merchant and Canadian senator
- Edward I. Devitt (1840–1920) – priest, Jesuit, Catholic historian
- Paul Dobson (born 1979) – curler
- Margaret Doody (born 1939) – author, feminist literary critic, professor at the University of Notre Dame
- Harry Doyle (born 1941) – former educator and MLA
- William Mark Duke (1879–1971) – prelate

== E ==
- Lawrence Earl (1915–2005) – photojournalist, author
- Sylvester Zobieski Earle (1822–1888) – physician, coroner, politician; mayor of Saint John
- Eldridge Eatman (1880–1960) – sprinter, First World War soldier
- Jerrod Edson (born 1974) – novelist
- Stanley Edward Elkin (1880–1960) – businessman, politician, House of Commons of Canada member
- John Valentine Ellis (1835–1913) – journalist, parliamentarian, senator
- Angelo Evelyn (born 1942) – painter

== F ==
- Roxanne Fairweather – businesswoman, co-CEO of Innovatia
- Harold Fanjoy (1939–2008) – politician
- Mark Fawcett (born 1972) – Olympic snowboarder
- May Agnes Fleming (1840–1880) – novelist
- Myra Freeman (born 1949) – teacher, politician; first female lieutenant governor of Nova Scotia
- Ryan Freeze (born 1995) – curler
- Madeleine Fritz (1896–1990) – paleontologist

== G ==
- Susan B. Ganong (1873–1961) – educator
- William Francis Ganong (1864–1941) – botanist, historian, cartographer, Smith College professor
- Ian Gardner (born 1981) – boxer
- Mort Garson (1924–2008) – electronic musician
- Abraham Pineo Gesner (1797–1864) – physician, geologist, inventor of kerosene
- Bradford Gilbert (ca. 1746–1814) – Loyalist merchant, MLA
- Charles Gorman (1898–1940) – top-ranking speed skater
- Hilliard Graves (born 1950) – former professional ice hockey player
- Philippe Guertin (born 1991) – long-distance swimmer

== H ==
- Heidi Hanlon (born 1958) – curler
- Elisabeth Harvor (born 1936) – novelist, poet
- Gavin Hassett (born 1973) – Olympic rower
- William C. Heine (1919–1991) – newspaper writer, author, University of Western Ontario journalism teacher
- Anna Minerva Henderson (1887–1987) – teacher, poet, civil servant
- Paul Higgins (born 1962) – former professional ice hockey player for the Toronto Maple Leafs
- Fred Hodges (1918–1999) – labour leader, civil rights activist, city councillor
- Bruce Holder (1905–1987) – violinist
- Thomas Holderness (1849–1924) – Indian Civil Service member
- John J. Holland (1843–1893) – shipbuilder
- Stuart Howe (born 1967) – operatic tenor
- William Lloyd Hoyt (born 1930) – lawyer, judge; chief justice of New Brunswick, member of the Bloody Sunday Inquiry
- Stephen Humbert (ca. 1766–1849) – merchant, politician
- Jack Humphrey (1901–1967) – watercolour painter
- John Horbury Hunt (1838–1904) – Australian architect

== I ==
- Arthur Irving (1930–2024) – billionaire businessman, owner of Irving Oil
- John E. Irving (1932–2010) – businessman
- Jay Isaac (born 1975) – artist

== J ==
- Frances James (1903–1988) – soprano
- Kim Jardine (born 1966) – politician
- Edward James Jarvis (1788–1852) – politician, lawyer, judge; chief justice of Prince Edward Island
- Munson Jarvis (1742–1824) – American-born merchant, MLA
- Ryan Jimmo (1981–2016) – mixed martial artist
- Gina Jordan (1929–2013) – pilot and Christian missionary
- Bob Joyce (born 1966) – former professional ice hockey player

== K ==
- Herzl Kashetsky (born 1950) – painter
- Jackie Keating (1908–1984) – professional ice hockey player for the New York Americans
- Ethel Knight Kelly (1875–1949) – Australian actress, writer
- Flora Kidd (1926–2008) – romance novelist
- Carl Killen – former politician, city councillor and MLA
- George Edwin King (1839–1901) – lawyer, politician; second and fourth premier of New Brunswick, puisne justice of the Supreme Court of Canada

== L ==
- Mark Lackie (born 1967) – Olympic speed skater
- Thomas Leavitt (1795–1850) – businessman, banker, president of the Bank of New Brunswick
- Abel LeBlanc (born 1934/1935) – politician
- Colin H. Livingstone (1863–1943) – banker, businessman, first national president of the Boy Scouts of America
- Bob Lockhart (1931–2023) – radio journalist, news director, mayor of Saint John
- Charles B. Lockhart (1855–1948) – merchant, politician; MLA and city councillor
- Willy Logan (1907–1955) – Olympic speed skater
- Wayne Long (born 1963) – politician, member of Parliament for the riding of Saint John—Rothesay
- Gerry Lowe – politician; city councillor and MLA

== M ==
- David Laurence MacLaren (1893–1960) – politician; Minister of National Revenue, 20th lieutenant governor of New Brunswick and mayor of Saint John
- Kevin MacMichael (1951–2002) – guitarist, original Cutting Crew band member
- Sarah Mallais (born 1989) – curler
- Margo Malowney (born 1967) – Olympic beach volleyball player
- Laurence Manning (1899–1972) – science fiction author
- Frederick Francis Mathers (1871–1947) – 18th lieutenant governor of Nova Scotia
- Matty Matheson (born 1982) – chef, restauranteur, actor, internet personality
- George Frederick Matthew (1837–1923) – botanist, geologist
- William Diller Matthew (1871–1930) – vertebrate paleontologist, curator of the American Museum of Natural History
- Spencer Mawhinney (born 1977) – curler
- Louis B. Mayer (1884–1957) – American film producer, co-founder of Metro-Goldwyn-Mayer (MGM) studios
- William Maynes (1902–1966) – Olympic sprinter
- Shirley McAlary – politician, former mayor of Saint John
- Robert McAllister (1876–1963) – politician
- Norm McFarlane – politician, former mayor of Saint John
- Art McGovern (1882–1915) – catcher for the Boston Americans
- Dan McIntyre (1950–2001) – human rights activist, race relations commissioner for Ontario
- Jim McKeever (1861–1897) – catcher for the Boston Reds
- Neil McKelvey (1925–2011) – lawyer
- Andrew McKim (born 1970) – former professional ice hockey player
- Catherine McKinnon (born 1944) – singer, actress
- David McKnight (1935–2006) – anthropologist and ethnographer
- Joseph Medill (1823–1899) – newspaper editor and publisher
- Brian Merrett (1945–2023) photographer, architectural activist
- Gerald Merrithew (1931–2004) – federal, provincial and municipal politician
- Eleanor Milne (1935–2014) – sculptor
- Willard M. Mitchell (1879–1955) – artist, architect
- J. Frank Morrison (1841–1916) – Baltimore electric company founder and political boss
- Henry Mullin (1862–1937) – Major League Baseball outfielder
- James Mullinger (born 1978) – English-born comedian
- William Murdoch (1823–1887) – Scottish-born poet, journalist
- Jamie Murphy (born 1981) – curler
- Steve Murphy (born 1960) – news anchor
- Frances Elizabeth Murray (ca. 1831–1901) – writer, charity worker
- Billy Myers (1923–2019) – Canadian football player for the Toronto Argonauts

== N ==
- Arthur James Nesbitt (1880–1954) – businessman
- Saul B. Newton (1906–1991) – psychotherapist
- Neil Nicholson (born 1949) – former National Hockey League defenseman for the Oakland Seals and the New York Islanders
- Mel Norton – former mayor of Saint John
- Alden Nowlan (1933–1983) – poet, novelist, playwright, editor for the Telegraph-Journal

== O ==
- John O'Brien (1866–1913) – Major League Baseball player
- Bill O'Neill (1880–1920) – Major League Baseball outfielder
- Chauncey O'Toole (born 1986) – former rugby union player and firefighter
- Jordan Owens (born 1986) – former professional ice hockey player

== P ==
- George Pack Jr. (1794–1875) – businessman
- William Paine (1750–1833) – United Empire Loyalist physician, politician; city councillor and MLA
- Robert Parker (1796–1865) – lawyer, judge, politician
- John Richard Partelow (1795–1865) – merchant, politician; MLA and mayor of Saint John
- Robert J. Patterson (1809–1884) – former American slave, restauranteur
- Lawrence Paul (1934–2014) – Millbrook First Nation chief
- Bill Phillips (1857–1900) – professional baseball player
- George Frederick Phillips (1862–1904) – U.S. Navy machinist, Spanish–American War veteran
- Walter Pidgeon (1897–1984) – American stage and film actor
- Young Pluto (1872–1931) – South African-born Australian boxer
- John Alexander Porteous (1932–1995) – columnist, journalist, broadcaster
- Frank L. Potts (1867–1926) – mayor of Saint John

== Q ==
- Jim Quinn (born 1957) – former Saint John Port Authority president, politician; senator

== R ==
- Nelson Rattenbury (1907–1973) – businessman, member of the Senate of Canada
- Donna Reardon – current mayor of Saint John
- Helen Leah Reed (1861/62–1926) – writer
- Daniel Aloysius Riley (1916–1984) – politician; member of Parliament, MLA, and member of the Senate of Canada
- Robert J. Ritchie – politician
- Darren Roach (born 1986) – curler
- Jason Roach (born 1984) – curler
- John Robertson (1799–1876) – Scottish-born businessman, mayor of Saint John, member of the Senate of Canada
- John Robinson (1762–1828) – American-born merchant, mayor of Saint John, MLA
- Fred Ross (1927–2014) – artist
- W. E. D. Ross (1912–1995) – actor, playwright, writer
- William Ryan (1887–1938) – barrister, journalist, politician

== S ==
- Harry Saltzman (1915–1994) – theatre and film producer
- Jean-Claude Sawyer (born 1986) – former professional ice hockey player
- Carl Schell (1924–2020) – judoka
- Loretta Leonard Shaw (1872–1940) – teacher, missionary
- Ryan Sherrard (born 1986) – curler
- Charles Simonds (1783–1859) – merchant, politician, MLA
- James Simonds (1735–1831) – merchant, judge, MLA for Sunbury County, Nova Scotia and New Brunswick
- Richard Simonds (1789–1836) – merchant, politician, MLA
- Bernard Skinner (1930–2016) – sailor
- Chris Skinner (born 1961) – former Canadian Football League player
- Clara Kathleen Smith (1911–2004) – poet
- Elizabeth J. Smith (1842–1900) – American social reformer, newspaper editor and publisher
- Elmer Boyd Smith (1860–1943) – writer and illustrator of children's books
- Nan Macpherson Smith (d. 1940) leader in women’s activities, as well patriotic, philanthropic, cultural, missionary, and benevolent projects in the Saint John area
- Jack Stafford (1879–1946) – professional baseball umpire
- Matt Stairs (born 1968) – former Major League Baseball player
- Bob Stephen (1958–2009) – Canadian Football League player
- Charlie Sullivan (born 1968) – curler
- Jim Sullivan (1968–2011) – curler
- Donald Sutherland (1935–2024) – actor
- John Sweeny (1821–1901) – Irish-born priest and bishop of Saint John
- Andrew Swim (born 1961) – Olympic bobsledder

== T ==
- Glen Tait – politician; MLA and former city councillor
- Eric Teed (1926–2010) – lawyer, mayor of Saint John
- Nancy Teed (1949–1993) – politician; MLA, senator
- George McCall Theal (1837–1919) – South African historian
- Ralph Thomas – human rights activist and former boxer
- Fred W. Thompson (1900–1987) – labor organizer, historian
- William Henry Thorne (1844–1923) – businessman, politician; senator
- Leonard Percy de Wolfe Tilley (1870–1947) – lawyer, politician; 21st premier of New Brunswick
- Samuel Leonard Tilley (1818–1896) – politician; Father of Confederation
- Sue Tingley (born 1977) – field hockey player, Yale Bulldogs assistant
- Ken Tobias (1945–2024) – singer-songwriter
- Clark Todd (1944–1983) – London bureau chief for the CTV Television Network
- Peter Trites (1946–2010) – teacher, politician; MLA and city councillor
- Stuart Trueman (1911–1995) – journalist, humorist
- Walter Harley Trueman (1870–1951) – lawyer, judge
- Joseph John Tucker (1832–1914) – English-born politician, newspaper president and Saint John Railway Company director
- John E. Turnbull – inventor
- Wallace Rupert Turnbull (1870–1954) – engineer, inventor

== V ==
- Yvon Vautour (born 1956) – former ice hockey coach, former National Hockey League player
- R. M. Vaughan (1965–2020) – writer and artist
- Frank L. Vernon (1873–1944) – priest, author

== W ==
- Charles Caleb Ward (1831–1896) – painter
- John Ward (1753–1846) – loyalist, businessman, politician; MLA
- Lyman Ward (born 1941) – actor
- Kent Warnock (born 1964) – former Canadian football player, defensive line coach for the Calgary Dinos
- Elsie Wayne (1932–2016) – politician; mayor of Saint John and member of Parliament
- Carol Webb (born 1982) – curler
- Maestro Fresh Wes (born 1968) – rapper
- Walter W. White (1862–1952) – physician, politician; mayor of Saint John, MLA
- Rupert Wilson Wigmore (1873–1939) – politician
- John McNeil Wilmot (1775–1847) – American-born businessman, judge, politician; MLA, mayor of Saint John
- Robert Duncan Wilmot (1809–1891) – municipal, provincial and federal politician; mayor of Saint John, Father of Confederation
- Edward Winchester (1970–2020) – lightweight rower
- Hugh Winsor (born 1938) – journalist
- Michelle Winters (born 1972) – writer and translator
- Ardeth Wood (1975–2003) – murder victim
- Susan Wood (1953–2018) – artist, educator
- William J. Woodroffe (1933–2003) – politician; MLA and city councillor
- Gordon Wry (1910–1985) – tenor, conductor

== Y ==
- Heather Young – filmmaker

== Z ==
- Joseph Zatzman (1912–2007) – businessman, politician, mayor of Dartmouth, Nova Scotia

== See also ==
- List of people from New Brunswick
