= Saint John Centre (electoral district) =

Defunct provincial electoral district in New Brunswick, Canada

New Brunswick electoral district

Defunct provincial electoral district
- Legislature: Legislative Assembly of New Brunswick
- District created: 1795
- District abolished: 1973
- First contested: 1795
- Last contested: 1970

Saint John Centre was a provincial electoral district for the Legislative Assembly of New Brunswick, Canada. It was created from Saint John in 1795 as Saint John City. It was renamed Saint John Centre in 1967.

It elected multiple members through the bloc voting system — two members prior to 1892 and four members from 1892 to 1973.

It was abolished with the 1973 electoral redistribution, when the province moved to single-member ridings.

== Members of the Legislative Assembly ==
Legislature	Years	Member	Party	Member	Party	Member	Party	Member	Party
Saint John City; Riding created from Saint John
3rd	1795 – 1802	George Younghusband	Ind.	Nathan Smith	Ind.				
4th	1802 – 1809	George Younghusband	Ind.	John Robinson	Ind.				
5th	1809 – 1810	John Garrison	Ind.	Stephen Humbert	Ind.				
5th	1810 – 1816	John Robinson	Ind.	Stephen Humbert	Ind.				
6th	1817 – 1819	Harry Peters	Ind.	Stephen Humbert	Ind.				
7th	1820	Harry Peters	Ind.	Stephen Humbert	Ind.				
8th	1821 – 1827	Harry Peters	Ind.	Hugh Johnston, Jr.	Ind.				
9th	1827 – 1830	Gregory Van Horne	Ind.	Hugh Johnston, Jr.	Ind.				
10th	1831 – 1834	Thomas Barlow	Ind.	William Boyd Kinnear	Ind.				
11th	1835 – 1837	Lewis Burns	Ind.	Isaac Woodward	Ind.				
12th	1837 – 1842	Thomas Barlow	Ind.	Isaac Woodward	Ind.				
13th	1843 – 1846	Robert Leonard Hazen	Cons.	Lewis Burns	Ind.				
14th	1847 – 1850	Robert Leonard Hazen	Cons.	Isaac Woodward	Ind.				
15th	1851	Samuel Leonard Tilley	Cons.	William Hayden Needham	Ind.				
15th	1851 – 1854	James A. Harding	Ind.	William Hayden Needham	Ind.				
16th	1854 – 1856	James A. Harding	Ind.	Samuel Leonard Tilley	Cons.				
17th	1856 – 1857	James A. Harding	Ind.	Joseph Wilson Lawrence	Ind.				
18th	1857 – 1861	James A. Harding	Ind.	Samuel Leonard Tilley	Cons.				
19th	1862 – 1865	Charles Watters	Ind.	Samuel Leonard Tilley	Cons.				
20th	1865 – 1866	Andrew Rainsford Wetmore	Cons.	Jacob Valentine Troop	Ind.				
21st	1866 – 1867	Andrew Rainsford Wetmore	Cons.	Samuel Leonard Tilley	Cons.				
21st	1867 – 1870	Andrew Rainsford Wetmore	Cons.	William H.A. Keans	Ind.				
22nd	1870 – 1874	Aaron Alward	Ind.	William Wedderburn	Ind.				
23rd	1875 – 1876	William H.A. Keans	Ind.	William Wedderburn	Ind.				
23rd	1876 – 1878	Robert Marshall	Lib.	William Wedderburn	Ind.				
24th	1879 – 1882	Robert Marshall	Lib.	William Wedderburn	Ind.				
25th	1883 – 1886	John Valentine Ellis	Lib.	Ezekiel McLeod	Cons.				
26th	1886 – 1887	John Valentine Ellis	Lib.	John Berryman	Lib.				
26th	1887 – 1890	Silas Alward	Lib.	John Berryman	Lib.				
27th	1890 – 1892	Silas Alward	Lib.	A.C. Smith	Ind.				
28th	1892 – 1895	Silas Alward	Lib.	A.C. Smith	Ind.	Alfred Augustus Stockton	Cons.	William Shaw	Lib.-Con.
29th	1896 – 1899	Silas Alward	Lib.	Charles B. Lockhart	Cons.	Alfred Augustus Stockton	Cons.	William Shaw	Lib.-Con.
30th	1899 – 1903	George Robertson	Ind.	Harrison A. McKeown	Lib.-Con.	Daniel S. Purdy	Ind.	William Shaw	Lib.-Con.
31st	1903 – 1904	George Robertson	Ind.	Harrison A. McKeown	Lib.-Con.	Daniel S. Purdy	Ind.	Edward Lantalum	Ind.
31st	1905 – 1908	George Robertson	Ind.	Robert Maxwell	Ind.	Daniel S. Purdy	Ind.	Edward Lantalum	Ind.
32nd	1908 – 1912	John Edward Wilson	Ind.	Robert Maxwell	Ind.	James P. McInerney	Ind.	Warren Franklin Hatheway	Cons.
33rd	1912 – 1917	John Edward Wilson	Ind.	Leonard Percy de Wolfe Tilley	Cons.	Charles B. Lockhart	Cons.	Phillip Grammen	Ind.
34th	1917 – 1920	John R. Campbell	Cons.	Leonard Percy de Wolfe Tilley	Cons.	Frank L. Potts	Cons.	William F. Roberts	Lib.
35th	1921 – 1925	Walter Edward Foster	Lib.	Robert Thomas Hayes	Cons.	William Edward Scully	Lib.	William F. Roberts	Lib.
36th	1925 – 1930	Leonard Percy de Wolfe Tilley	Cons.	James Lewis	Cons.	W. Henry Harrison	Cons.	Miles E. Agar	Cons.
37th	1931 – 1935	Leonard Percy de Wolfe Tilley	Cons.	Walter W. White	Cons.	W. Henry Harrison	Cons.	Miles E. Agar	Cons.
38th	1935 – 1939	A. P. Paterson	Lib.	William F. Roberts	Lib.	Horace A. Porter	Lib.	E. J. Henneberry	Lib.
39th	1939 – 1944	Ralph McInerney	Cons.	W. Grant Smith	Cons.	W. J. Swanton	Cons.	J. Starr Tait	Cons.
40th	1944 – 1948	Ralph McInerney	PC	W. Grant Smith	PC	Lawrence T. Dow	PC	J. Starr Tait	PC
41st	1948 – 1952	James W. Brittain	Lib.	Harold Gault	Lib.	S. Roy Kelly	Lib.	Robert H. Carlin	Lib.
42nd	1952 – 1956	Donald D. Patterson	PC	Arthur Skaling	PC	Harold S. Prince	PC	George E. McInerney	PC
43rd	1957 – 1960	Donald D. Patterson	PC	Arthur Skaling	PC	George L. Keith	PC	George E. McInerney	PC
44th	1960 – 1963	Donald D. Patterson	PC	R. M. Pendrigh	PC	George L. Keith	PC	George E. McInerney	PC
45th	1963 – 1966	Donald D. Patterson	PC	Daniel Aloysius Riley	Lib.	John D. MacCallum	Lib.	George E. McInerney	PC
45th	1966 – 1967	Donald D. Patterson	PC	Stephen Weyman	Lib.	John D. MacCallum	Lib.	George E. McInerney	PC
Saint John Center
46th	1967 – 1970	J. Lorne McGuigan	PC	George E. McInerney	PC	Donald D. Patterson	PC	Robert J. Higgins	Lib.
47th	1970 – 1972	J. Lorne McGuigan	PC	George E. McInerney	PC	Eric Teed	PC	Robert J. Higgins	Lib.
47th	1973 – 1974	J. Lorne McGuigan	PC	John W. Turnbull	Lib.	Eric Teed	PC	Robert J. Higgins	Lib.
Riding dissolved into Saint John Harbour, Saint John North, Saint John Park and Saint John South

== Election results ==
=== Saint John Centre ===
New Brunswick provincial by-election, 25 June 1973
Party	Candidate	Votes	Elected
Liberal	John W. Turnbull	6,933	✓
Progressive Conservative	George W. Bate	6,848	

1970 New Brunswick general election
Party	Candidate	Votes	Elected
Progressive Conservative	J. Lorne McGuigan	10,435	✓
Progressive Conservative	Eric L. Teed	9,943	✓
Liberal	Robert J. Higgins	9,926	✓
Progressive Conservative	George E. McInerney	9,750	✓
Progressive Conservative	Wallace P. MacMurray	9,533	
Liberal	Stephen Weyman	7,766	
Liberal	Joseph G. Boyce	7,726	
Liberal	J. Esmonde Barry	7,566	
New Democratic	Eldon John Richardson	996	
New Democratic	David Hugh Jory	901	
New Democratic	Peter Douglas Gibson	799	
New Democratic	John Caleb Sutton	642	
Independent	Michael Ronald Landers	134	

1967 New Brunswick general election
Party	Candidate	Votes	Elected
Progressive Conservative	J. Lorne McGuigan	11,803	✓
Progressive Conservative	D.D. Patterson	11,386	✓
Progressive Conservative	George E. McInerney	11,255	✓
Liberal	Robert Higgins	10,671	✓
Progressive Conservative	H.C. "Nig" Tracy	10,651	
Liberal	Stephen Weyman	9,992	
Liberal	John MacCallum	9,689	
Liberal	Jas. W. O'Brien	9,500	

== See also ==
- List of New Brunswick provincial electoral districts
- Canadian provincial electoral districts
