= 38th New Brunswick Legislature =

Canadian provincial legislative assembly

The 38th New Brunswick Legislative Assembly represented New Brunswick between March 5, 1936, and October 24, 1939.

Murray MacLaren served as Lieutenant-Governor of New Brunswick.

Hedley F. G. Bridges was chosen as speaker.

The Liberal Party led by Allison Dysart formed the government.

== Members ==
Electoral District	Name	Party	First elected / previously elected
Albert	H. O. Downey	Liberal	1930
Albert	Fred Colpitts	Liberal	1930
Carleton	Edwin W. Melville	Conservative	1925
Carleton	Gladstone W. Perry	Conservative	1930
Carleton	Fred C. Squires	Conservative	1925
Charlotte	A. D. Dyas	Liberal	1935
Charlotte	J.J. Hayes Doone	Liberal	1935
Charlotte	R. Fraser Keay	Liberal	1935
Charlotte	Foster C. Calder	Liberal	1935
Gloucester	Clovis T. Richard	Liberal	1926
Gloucester	J. André Doucet	Liberal	1923
Gloucester	F.T.B. Young	Liberal	1935
Gloucester	William A. Losier	Liberal	1935
Kent	A. Allison Dysart	Liberal	1917
Kent	Auguste J. Bordage	Liberal	1917
Kent	François G. Richard	Liberal	1917
Kings	Walter W. V. Foster	Liberal	1935
Kings	Colin C. McDonald	Liberal	1935
Kings	W. A. Jeffries	Liberal	1935
Madawaska	Pio Laporte	Liberal	1935
Madawaska	J. Gaspard Boucher	Liberal	1935
Moncton	Charles H. Blakeney	Liberal	1935
Northumberland	William S. Anderson	Liberal	1930
Northumberland	Richard J. Gill	Liberal	1930
Northumberland	Frederick M. Tweedie	Liberal	1930
Northumberland	Hidulphe A. Savoie	Liberal	1930
Queens	F. A. McGrand	Liberal	1935
Queens	W. M. Jenkins	Liberal	1935
Restigouche	H.F.G. Bridges	Liberal	1935
Restigouche	Philibert LeBlanc	Liberal	1935
Saint John City	A. P. Paterson	Liberal	1935
Saint John City	W. F. Roberts	Liberal	1917, 1935
Saint John City	Horace A. Porter	Liberal	1935
Saint John City	E. J. Henneberry	Liberal	1935
Saint John County	Robert McAllister	Conservative	1931
Saint John County	H. Colby Smith	Conservative	1926
Sunbury	Gabriel F. Smith	Liberal	1935
Sunbury	W. C. Lawson	Liberal	1935
Victoria	Frederick W. Pirie	Liberal	1930
Victoria	John W. Niles	Liberal	1925
Westmorland	Austin C. Taylor	Liberal	1935
Westmorland	Frank H. Copp	Liberal	1935
Westmorland	E. R. McDonald	Liberal	1935
Westmorland	Simeon Melanson	Liberal	1935
York	John B. McNair	Liberal	1935
York	Ernest W. Stairs	Liberal	1935
York	H. Ralph Gunter	Liberal	1935
York	Stewart E. Durling	Liberal	1935

Preceded by 37th New Brunswick Legislature	Legislative Assemblies of New Brunswick; 1935–1939	Succeeded by 39th New Brunswick Legislature
