= 32nd New Brunswick Legislature =

The 32nd New Brunswick Legislative Assembly represented New Brunswick between April 30, 1908, and May 25, 1912.

Lemuel John Tweedie served as Lieutenant-Governor of New Brunswick.

D. Morrison was chosen as speaker in 1908. G.J. Clarke became speaker in 1909 after Morrison resigned.

The Conservative Party led by John Douglas Hazen formed the government for the first time since 1883. James Kidd Flemming became party leader in 1911 when Hazen entered federal politics.

== Members ==
Electoral District	Name	Party	First elected / previously elected
Albert	Walter B. Dickson	Independent	1908
Albert	George D. Prescott	Independent	1908
Carleton	Benjamin F. Smith	Conservative	1903
Carleton	James K. Fleming	Conservative	1900
Carleton	Donald Munro	Independent	1908
Carleton	George W. Upham (1908)	Independent	1908
Charlotte	Henry I. Taylor	Conservative	1908
Charlotte	George J. Clarke	Conservative	1903
Charlotte	Thomas A. Hartt	Conservative	1903
Charlotte	Ward C.H. Grimmer	Conservative	1903
Charlotte	Scott D. Guptill (1912)	Conservative	1912
Gloucester	Alphonse Sormany	Independent Liberal	1908
Gloucester	James P. Byrne	Independent Liberal	1908
Gloucester	Seraphine R. Léger	Liberal	1908
Kent	Thomas J. Bourque	Conservative	1908
Kent	D.V. Landry	Conservative	1908
Kent	John Sheridan	Conservative	1908
Kings	George B. Jones	Conservative	1908
Kings	Frederick M. Sproule	Independent	1908
Kings	James A. Murray	Conservative	1908
Madawaska	Charles L. Cyr	Independent	1908
Madawaska	Jesse W. Baker	Independent	1908
Northumberland	John Morrissy	Liberal	1887, 1903
Northumberland	Donald Morrison	Conservative	1903
Northumberland	William L. Allain	Conservative	1908
Northumberland	Daniel P. MacLachlan	Independent	1908
Northumberland	John P. Burchill (1908)	Liberal	1882, 1887, 1908
Queens	Harry W. Woods	Independent	1908
Queens	Arthur B. Slipp	Independent	1908
Restigouche	Charles H. LaBillois	Conservative	1892
Restigouche	William Currie	Liberal	1907
Saint John City	John Edward Wilson	Independent	1908
Saint John City	Robert Maxwell	Independent	1905
Saint John City	James P. McInerney	Independent	1908
Saint John City	W. Franklin Hatheway	Independent	1908
Saint John County	James Lowell	Independent	1905
Saint John County	Harrison A. McKeown	Conservative	1907
Saint John County	John M. Baxter (1911)	Conservative	1911
Saint John County	Allister F. Bentley (1909)	Liberal	1909
Sunbury	John D. Hazen	Conservative	1899
Sunbury	Parker Glasier	Conservative	1899
Sunbury	George A. Perley (1911)	Independent	1911
Victoria	John F. Tweeddale	Liberal	1903
Victoria	James Burgess Jr.	Independent	1903
Westmorland	Clifford W. Robinson	Liberal	1897
Westmorland	Arthur B. Copp	Liberal	1901
Westmorland	Francis J. Sweeney	Liberal	1903
Westmorland	Clément M. Léger	Liberal	1903
York	Harry F. McLeod	Conservative	1908
York	John A. Young	Conservative	1908
York	Thomas Robison	Conservative	1908
York	James K. Pinder	Conservative	1892, 1908
York	Oscar E. Morehouse (1911)	Conservative	1911

Preceded by 31st New Brunswick Legislature	Legislative Assemblies of New Brunswick; 1908–1912	Succeeded by 33rd New Brunswick Legislature
