= Walter Edward Foster =

Canadian politician (1873–1947)

The Honourable Walter Edward Foster PC
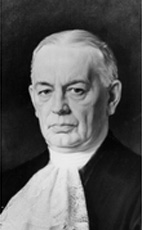
- The Honourable Walter Edward Foster, PC

17th Premier of New Brunswick
- In office April 4, 1917 – February 1, 1923
- Monarch: George V
- Lieutenant Governor: Josiah Wood; Gilbert White Ganong; William Pugsley
- Preceded by: James A. Murray
- Succeeded by: Peter J. Veniot

MLA for Victoria
- In office April 23, 1917 – October 9, 1920 Serving with John F. Tweeddale
- Preceded by: James Burgess Jr.
- Succeeded by: George W. Warnock

MLA for Saint John City
- In office October 9, 1920 – February 1, 1923 Serving with Robert T. Hayes, William E. Scully, W. F. Roberts
- Preceded by: John R. Campbell
- Succeeded by: Leonard P. D. Tilley

Secretary of State for Canada
- In office September 26, 1925 – November 12, 1925
- Prime Minister: W. L. Mackenzie King
- Preceded by: Arthur Bliss Copp
- Succeeded by: Charles Murphy (Acting)

Speaker of the Senate of Canada
- In office January 11, 1936 – May 8, 1940
- Prime Minister: W. L. Mackenzie King
- Preceded by: Pierre-Édouard Blondin
- Succeeded by: Georges Parent

Senator for Saint John, New Brunswick
- In office December 6, 1928 – November 14, 1947
- Nominated by: W. L. Mackenzie King
- Appointed by: The Marquess of Willingdon

Personal details
- Born: April 9, 1873 St. Martins, New Brunswick, Canada
- Died: November 14, 1947 (aged 74) Saint John, New Brunswick, Canada
- Party: New Brunswick Liberal Association; Liberal Party of Canada
- Spouse: Johanna M. Vassie (m. 1903)
- Children: Walter W. V. Foster
- Occupation: Businessman
- Profession: Politician

Walter Edward Foster PC (April 9, 1873 – November 14, 1947) was a Canadian politician and businessman in New Brunswick.

== Early life ==
Foster was born in St. Martins, New Brunswick. He began work as a clerk with the Bank of New Brunswick at Saint John. He joined the merchant firm of Vassie and Company and became vice president and managing director after marrying Johanna Vassie, daughter of the firm's head. Active in community business affairs, Foster served as President of the Saint John Board of Trade in 1908–1909.

== Political career ==
In 1916, Walter Foster became leader of the province's Liberal Party which swept to victory in the 1917 election. Foster was defeated in the Saint John County riding in the 1917 election but was elected to the Legislative Assembly by acclamation in a by-election later that year in Victoria County. Though leader at age 45, he was called the "boy premier" for his youthful, cleancut appearance (Doyle). His government established the first department of health in 1918, gave women the right to vote in 1919 and created the province's power commission in 1920.

Walter Foster resigned from provincial politics on February 1, 1923 in order to return to put his own failing personal finances in order. He entered federal politics becoming Secretary of State of Canada in 1925, but failed to win a seat in that year's federal election.

In 1928, Walter Foster was appointed by Prime Minister Mackenzie King to the Senate of Canada and served as Speaker of the Senate of Canada from 1936 to 1940.

== Personal life and death ==
Foster married Joanna Vassie in 1903. His son, Walter William Vassie Foster, served in the provincial Legislative Assembly.

He died in office in Saint John at the age of 74 and was buried in the Cedar Hill Cemetery.
