= Department of Education and Early Childhood Development (New Brunswick) =

Government department in New Brunswick, Canada

Agency overview
- Formed: 2010
- Jurisdiction: New Brunswick
- Parent department: Government of New Brunswick

The Department of Education and Early Childhood Development is an executive agency of the Government of New Brunswick, Canada. It is responsible for the administration of the New Brunswick public education system. Its primary and secondary schools are divided into seven districts: four anglophone districts and three francophone districts, each functioning as a separate unit.

On May 14, 1998, it also took over responsibility for universities and community colleges. However, community colleges were later transferred to the Department of Training and Employment Development on March 23, 2000. On February 14, 2006, the department returned to its pre-1998 configuration, with responsibility solely for primary and secondary schools when universities were moved to the new Department of Post-secondary Education and Training.

In October 2010, it took responsibility for early childhood education from the Department of Social Development and its name changed from the Department of Education to the Department of Education and Early Childhood Development.

== Ministers ==
#	Minister	Term	Government
1.	A. P. Paterson	July 16, 1938 – January 10, 1940	under Allison Dysart
2.	Charles H. Blakeney	January 10, 1940 – March 13, 1940	under Allison Dysart
2.	Charles H. Blakeney	March 13, 1940 - November 2, 1948	under John B. McNair
3.	James W. Brittain	November 2, 1948 – October 8, 1952	under John B. McNair
4.	Claude Taylor	October 8, 1952 – July 8, 1960	under Hugh John Flemming
5.	Henry Irwin	July 8, 1960 – April 5, 1966	under Louis Robichaud
6.	W. Wynn Meldrum	April 5, 1966 – November 12, 1970	under Louis Robichaud
7.	Lorne McGuigan	November 12, 1970 – December 3, 1974	under Richard Hatfield
8.	Gerald Merrithew	December 3, 1974 – December 20, 1976	under Richard Hatfield
9.	Charles Gallagher	December 20, 1976 – October 30, 1982	under Richard Hatfield
10.	Clarence Cormier	October 30, 1982 – October 3, 1985	under Richard Hatfield
11.	Jean-Pierre Ouellet	October 3, 1985 – October 27, 1987	under Richard Hatfield
12.	Shirley Dysart	October 27, 1987 – October 8, 1991	under Frank McKenna
13.	Paul Duffie	October 9, 1991 – April 27, 1994	under Frank McKenna
14.	Vaughn Blaney	April 27, 1994 – September 26, 1995	under Frank McKenna
15.	James E. Lockyer	September 26, 1995 – July 23, 1997	under Frank McKenna
16.	Bernard Richard	July 23, 1997 – October 13, 1997	under Frank McKenna
16.	Bernard Richard	October 13, 1997 – February 6, 1998	under Ray Frenette
17.	Bernard Thériault (interim)	February 6, 1998 – May 14, 1998	under Ray Frenette
18.	Bernard Richard (2nd time)	May 14, 1998 – June 21, 1999	under Camille Thériault
19.	Elvy Robichaud	June 21, 1999 – October 9, 2001	under Bernard Lord
20.	Dennis Furlong	October 9, 2001 – June 27, 2003	under Bernard Lord
21.	Madeleine Dubé	June 27, 2003 – February 14, 2006	under Bernard Lord
22.	Claude Williams	February 14, 2006 – October 3, 2006	under Bernard Lord
23.	Kelly Lamrock	October 3, 2006 – June 2009	under Shawn Graham
24.	Roland Haché	June 2009 - October 12, 2010	under Shawn Graham
25.	Jody Carr	October 12, 2010 – September 23, 2013	under David Alward
26.	Marie-Claude Blais	September 23, 2013 – October 7, 2014	under David Alward
27.	Serge Rousselle	October 7, 2014 – 6 June 2016	under Brian Gallant
28.	Brian Kenny	6 June 2016-9 November 2018	under Brian Gallant
29.	Dominic Cardy	9 November 2018 – 13 October 2022	under Blaine Higgs
30.	Bill Hogan	13 October 2022 – 2 November, 2024	under Blaine Higgs
31.	Claire Johnson	2 November, 2024 - Present	under Susan Holt

== See also ==
- New Brunswick Department of Education District 17
