= Walter W. White =

Canadian politician (1862–1952)

His Worship Walter W. White FRCS
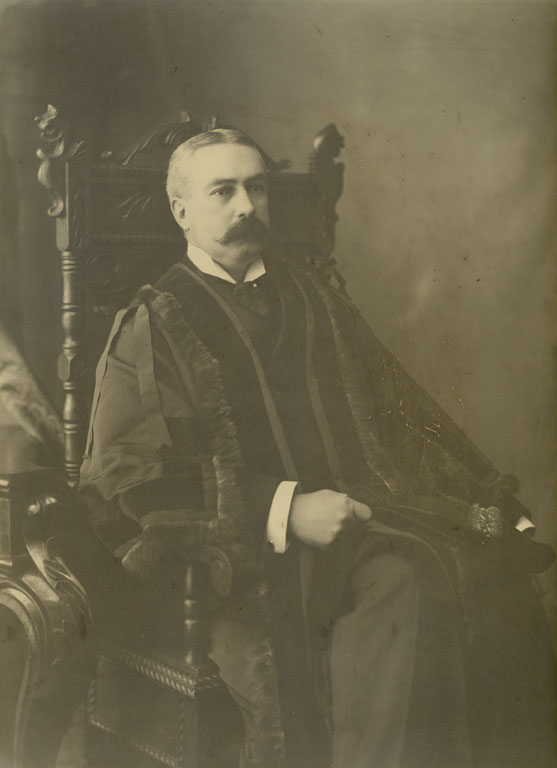
- White, pictured between c. 1902–1906

Member of the Legislative Assembly of New Brunswick
- In office 1931–1935
- Constituency: Saint John City

41st Mayor of Saint John, New Brunswick
- In office 1902–1906
- Preceded by: John Waterhouse Daniel
- Succeeded by: Edward Sears

50th Mayor of Saint John, New Brunswick
- In office 1926–1932
- Preceded by: Frank L. Potts
- Succeeded by: James W. Brittain

Personal details
- Born: Walter Woodworth White; December 14, 1862 Saint John, New Brunswick
- Died: July 10, 1952 (aged 89) Saint John, New Brunswick
- Party: Conservative
- Spouse: Nellie G. Troop
- Children: 4
- Education: University of New Brunswick (B.A.); McGill University (M.D.C.M.)
- Occupation: physician

Walter Woodworth White FRCS (December 14, 1862 – July 10, 1952) was a Canadian physician as well as a municipal and provincial politician in New Brunswick. He served as the Mayor of Saint John between 1902 and 1906, and again from 1926 until 1932. In provincial politics, White served in the Legislative Assembly of New Brunswick as a member of the Conservative Party, representing Saint John City from 1931 to 1935.

Born in Saint John, White went to Saint John High School and took further education at the University of New Brunswick (UNB), receiving a Bachelor of Arts in 1882. Afterwards, he went to McGill University where he received his M.D.C.M. in 1884. White returned to Saint John and began working as a physician in 1887, serving as a surgeon at a couple of hospitals in the area. He entered municipal politics in 1902, where he was elected as Mayor of Saint John. After some years away from politics, he was re-elected under the same mayoral position in 1926, and succeeded during further re-elections until 1932. He had short involvement with provincial politics, serving one term in the legislature from 1930 until his district was defeated by the Opposition (Liberal) party in 1935.

== Early life and education ==
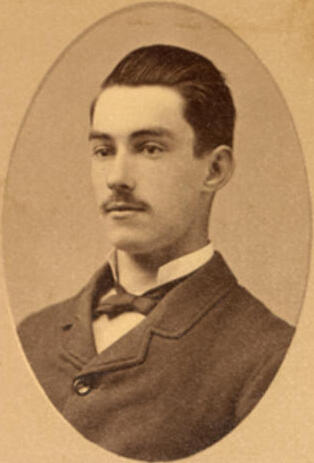
White, pictured in a UNB Encaenia portrait in 1882

Walter Woodworth White was born on December 14, 1862, in Saint John, to parents Vincent S. and Charlotte (née Douglas) White. He attended Saint John High School, and afterwards took further education at the University of New Brunswick (UNB), where he received an honours Bachelor of Arts in classics and natural science in 1882. Two years later, he received his M.D.C.M. at McGill University; he also received his ad eundem here. White also briefly studied botany, having taken a UNB course in the subject. He was advised against taking the same course again by professors at McGill, which led to him missing out on receiving a Holmes Gold Medal.

Beyond degrees received in Canadian institutions, White would further receive a Master of Arts, M.D., Legum Doctor, L.R.C.P., and a Fellowship of the Royal Colleges of Surgeons from Edinburgh as well as a L.F.P.S. from Glasgow. In 1907, White also received a diploma of M.R.C.S. from the Royal College of Surgeons of England.

== Career ==
White began his career as a physician in 1887, in his home city of Saint John; he was later considered to be one of the leading physicians here. In 1890, he was appointed to the General Public Hospital in Saint John as a surgeon, later serving as a member of its commission board. He stopped working here in 1912, and later took another surgeon position at the Lancaster Hospital from 1919 until 1930.

Throughout his medical career, White served as the president of several medical organizations, including one based in Saint John, another one based provincially, along with national medical organizations Canadian Medical Association as well as the Medical Council of Canada. Additional roles he served under include being a Bank of New Brunswick director as well as a public school trustee.

By around late 1901, White was a Major for the 3rd New Brunswick Regiment. In 1902, White was provincially appointed as the Boys' Industrial Home board of governors chairman. By 1905, White was also serving as the Champlain Tercentenary Committee's Chairman.

=== Political career ===
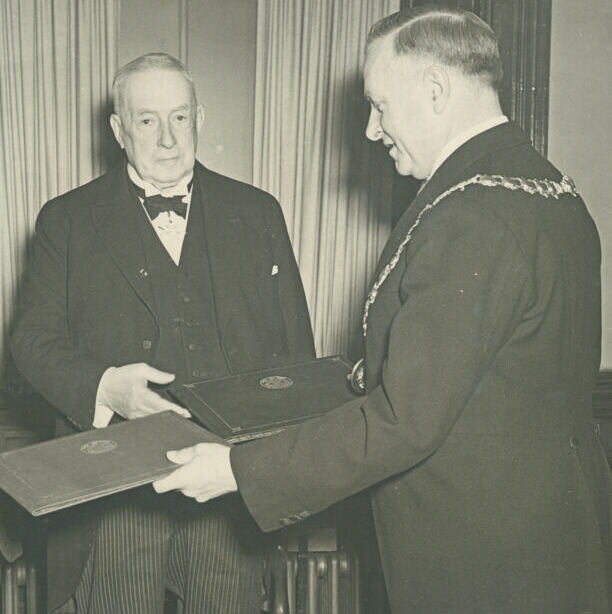
White receiving the Freedom of the City, c. 1940

In 1901, White served as the warden for both the City of Saint John as well as Saint John County. On April 16, 1902, he was elected Mayor of Saint John; he was officially appointed to the position on May 6, 1902, succeeding John Waterhouse Daniel. He did not run for re-election in 1906, though he did endorse candidate James H. Frink.

On April 12, 1926, White was re-elected as Mayor of Saint John for a two-year term. Despite being a particularly late campaign entry, he won the election with 2,876 votes. On January 21, 1930, White, while still serving as mayor, was elected to serve as warden again. During April of that same year, White, as the only mayoral candidate at the time, was re-elected for another two-year term as mayor, which began on May 1, 1930.

White also began participating in provincial politics. In June 1930, he emerged as a Government (Conservative) candidate for the four-member district of Saint John City in the Legislative Assembly of New Brunswick along with Leonard Percy de Wolfe Tilley, William Henry Harrison, and Miles E. Agar. On June 19, 1930, all four of them beat the Opposition candidates by a landslide; each received over 8,500 votes, with White himself receiving 8,902 votes, the most out of any other candidate in the district. Back in Saint John municipal politics, White ran for re-election for a sixth mayoral term in 1932, as one of five candidates. He came in third place with 1,323 votes, resulting in his mayoral position, which he had held since 1926, being succeeded by James W. Brittain, who was elected on April 11, 1932. On May 21, 1935, White announced his candidacy for re-election in his incumbent legislative seat representing Saint John City. The election was to be held on June 27. White, along with the other incumbent Conservatives, were all defeated by four members of the New Brunswick Liberal Association.

Following his political career, White continued working in the medical field until his retirement in 1942.

== Personal life and death ==
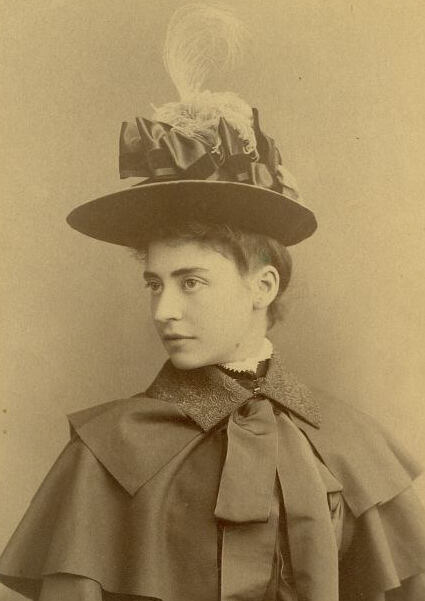
White's wife, pictured between c. 1888–1890

White practiced Episcopalianism. He married Helen (Nellie) Gertrude Troop on June 14, 1893, in Saint John. They had four children. Prior to their marriage, White had a brick mansion built in 1891 for his future wife, architected by McKean and Fairweather, who had also built the Saint John City Market, the Saint John Masonic Temple, as well as the Fredericton City Hall. His future wife was initially discouraged to marry him because of her peers; they considered White, a 28-year-old at the time, to be too old of a husband. White and his family lived in the house for the remainder of his life. The building was later operated as the Parkerhouse Inn, and, since August 2005, has been operated by Chipman Hill Suites.

White died on July 10, 1952, in Saint John, at the age of 89. He was buried four days later at Fernhill Cemetery. His obituary labeled him as "one of Saint John's most distinguished citizens." This was later echoed in 1991 by The Globe and Mail, who considered White "one of the city's most prominent citizens." For a period of time after his death, a four-year scholarship valued at CA$1,400 was awarded in his name to "the most promising male student" graduating from Saint John High School and entering UNB.

== See also ==
- List of mayors of Saint John, New Brunswick
