= Saint John Harbour (1974–1995) =

Defunct provincial electoral district in New Brunswick, Canada

New Brunswick electoral district
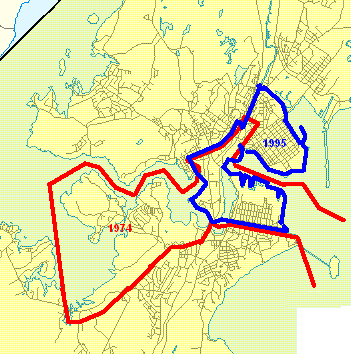
- The boundaries of the original Saint John Harbour (red) overlaid with the boundaries of this district as it stood from 1995 to 2006 (blue)

Defunct provincial electoral district
- Legislature: Legislative Assembly of New Brunswick
- District created: 1973
- District abolished: 1994
- First contested: 1974
- Last contested: 1991

Saint John Harbour was a provincial electoral district in New Brunswick. It was created from the multi-member riding of Saint John Centre in the 1973 electoral redistribution, and was abolished in the 1994 electoral redistribution.

== Members of the Legislative Assembly ==
Assembly	Years	Member	Party
Riding created from Saint John Centre
48th	1974–1978	John Turnbull	Liberal
49th	1978–1982	Louis Murphy	Liberal
50th	1982–1987	Louis Murphy	Liberal
51st	1987–1991	Louis Murphy	Liberal
52nd	1991–1995	Louis Murphy	Liberal
Riding dissolved into Saint John Lancaster and Saint John Harbour (1995–)

== Election results ==
1991 New Brunswick general election
Party	Candidate	Votes	%	±%
Liberal	Louis Murphy	1,779	43.53	-19.33
New Democratic	Al Maund	968	23.68	+5.83
Confederation of Regions	Marie Gerrior	844	20.65	–
Progressive Conservative	Nargis Kheraj	496	12.14	-7.15
Total valid votes		4,087	100.0	
Liberal hold		Swing		-12.58

1987 New Brunswick general election
Party	Candidate	Votes	%	±%
Liberal	Louis Murphy	2,705	62.86	+18.59
Progressive Conservative	Gay Wittrien	830	19.29	-21.47
New Democratic	Kenneth Wilcox	768	17.85	+2.88
Total valid votes		4,303	100.0	
Liberal hold		Swing		+20.03

1982 New Brunswick general election
Party	Candidate	Votes	%	±%
Liberal	Louis Edward Murphy	2,055	44.27	+0.81
Progressive Conservative	Foster Hammond	1,892	40.76	-0.45
New Democratic	Dee Dee M.A. Daigle	695	14.97	-0.36
Total valid votes		4,642	100.0	
Liberal hold		Swing		+0.63

1978 New Brunswick general election
Party	Candidate	Votes	%	±%
Liberal	Louis E. Murphy	1,772	43.46	-9.91
Progressive Conservative	E. Lorne Richardson	1,680	41.21	-1.12
New Democratic	Harrison G. Harvey	625	15.33	+11.03
Total valid votes		4,077	100.0	
Liberal hold		Swing		-4.40

1974 New Brunswick general election
Party	Candidate	Votes	%
Liberal	John W. Turnbull	2,544	53.37
Progressive Conservative	Eric L. Teed	2,018	42.33
New Democratic	William Gray	205	4.30
Total valid votes		4,767	100.0
The previous multi-member riding of Saint John Centre elected three Progressive Conservative and one Liberal in the previous election, with one of the PC seats won by a Liberal in a by-election. Both John Turnbull and Eric Teed were among the four incumbents.

== See also ==
- List of New Brunswick provincial electoral districts
- Canadian provincial electoral districts
