= Ann Barker (civil servant) =

American writer

Dr Ann Barker JP (born 5 August 1946) is a historian, criminologist and public servant in Britain. She is a Justice of the Peace, the Complaints Commissioner of the Bar Standards Board and Chair of the Complaints Audit Committee, an independent inspectorate set up by the UK government to restore public confidence in the immigration and asylum system administered by the Border and Immigration Agency. She also sits on General Medical Council Fitness to Practise Panels, the Mental Health Review Tribunal, and the appeal panel of the medical Royal Colleges. She is a former member and spokeswoman for the Parole Board. She was appointed to serve on the Police Complaints Authority from 3 December 2001.

== Personal life ==
She was born in Pasadena, California as Ann Botsford Callender, being descended from the Callenders of Stirlingshire and the Botsford dynasty of New Brunswick, (see Amos Botsford and Amos Edwin Botsford, two-time speaker of the Canadian Senate). She was educated at Westridge School (Pasadena), Mount Holyoke and Harvard University. While studying for her doctorate, she was a Woodrow Wilson scholar and Harvard Graduate Prize Fellow. She has taught History at Harvard and the University of London, and was a Visiting Fellow in Criminology at Oxford University.
