= Frank L. Potts =

Canadian Politician

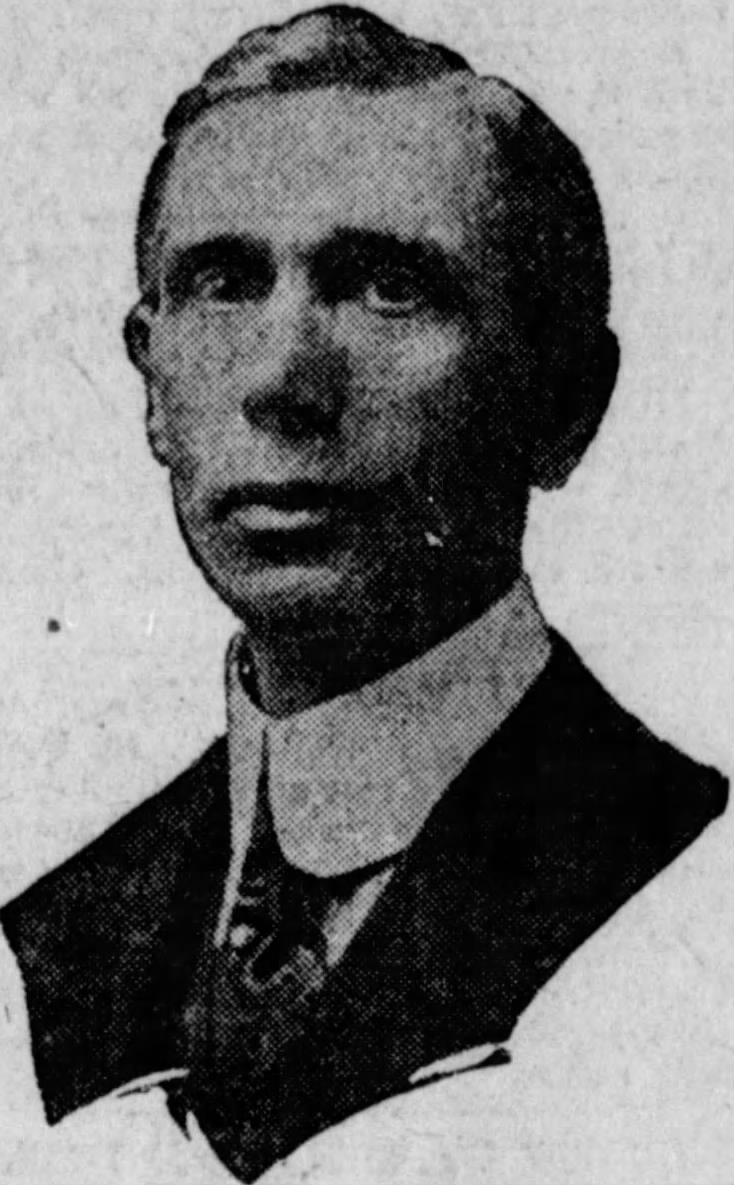

49th Mayor of Saint John, New Brunswick
- In office 1925–1926
- Preceded by: G. Frederick Fisher
- Succeeded by: Walter W. White

Member of the Legislative Assembly of New Brunswick
- In office 1925–1926 Serving with John Babington Macaulay Baxter
- Succeeded by: H. Colby Smith
- Constituency: Saint John County
- In office 1917–1920 Serving with John R. Campbell, Leonard Percy de Wolfe Tilley and William Francis Roberts
- Constituency: Saint John City

Personal details
- Born: Frank Leslie Potts; May 20, 1867; Saint John, New Brunswick
- Died: January 7, 1926 (aged 58); Saint John, New Brunswick
- Political party: Conservative
- Spouse: Elizabeth May Fleming
- Children: 2

Frank Leslie Potts (May 20, 1867 – January 7, 1926) was a Canadian politician, auctioneer, broker, and appraiser. He died after being re-elected to the Legislative Assembly of New Brunswick for the riding of Saint John County. He had previously been a member of the Legislative Assembly of New Brunswick for the riding of Saint John City.

== Personal life ==
Potts was born in Saint John, New Brunswick, Canada to Joseph William Potts and Eunice Louise Battle. He was married to Elizabeth May Fleming and they had two children, Roy Flewelling Potts (1887-1974) and Gladys Leslie Potts (1888-1888). His father was the brother-in-law of John A. Munro, who was tried and convicted of the murder of his mistress, Sarah Margaret Vail and their daughter, Ella May Munroe.

== Career ==
Potts worked as an auctioneer, broker, and appraiser. He was an alderman of Saint John, New Brunswick and the founder of the St. John Land Tax Movement. He was elected mayor of Saint John in 1924 but was unable to finish his term as he died in 1926 at the age of 58. He is buried in Fernhill Cemetery in Saint John.
