= George McInerney =

George McInerney may refer to:

- George Valentine McInerney (1857–1908), lawyer and politician in New Brunswick, Canada
- George E. McInerney (1915–1972), lawyer and political figure in New Brunswick
