= John Wilson (New Brunswick politician) =

John Edward Wilson

Member of the Legislative Assembly of New Brunswick
- In office 1908–1917 Serving with Robert Maxwell, James P. McInerney, Phillip Grammen, Warren Franklin Hatheway, Charles B. Lockhart, Leonard Percy de Wolfe Tilley
- Constituency: Saint John City

Personal details
- Born: August 8, 1861 Saint John, New Brunswick
- Died: February 2, 1935 (aged 73) Saint John, New Brunswick
- Party: Independent
- Spouse: Beatrice J. Orr
- Children: 4
- Occupation: businessman

John Edward Wilson (August 8, 1861 – February 2, 1935) was a Canadian politician. He served in the Legislative Assembly of New Brunswick from 1908 to 1917 as an independent member.
