= Robert Carlin (disambiguation) =

Robert Carlin may refer to:

- Robert Carlin (jockey), see 1839 Grand National
- Robert Carlin (cricketer) (1871-1950), English cricketer
- Robert H. Carlin (1887-1953), Canadian politician
- Robert Carlin (1901-1991), Canadian politician

== See also ==
- Bob Carlin (born 1953), American old-time banjo player and singer
