= Leonard Percy de Wolfe Tilley (politician) =

Canadian politician (1870–1947)

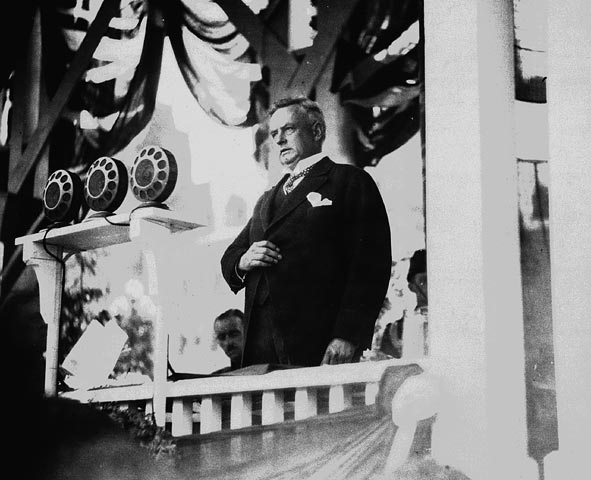
- Leonard P. D. Tilley speaking on Parliament Hill in 1927

21st Premier of New Brunswick
- In office June 1, 1933 – July 16, 1935
- Monarch: George V
- Lieutenant Governor: Hugh Havelock McLean; Murray MacLaren
- Preceded by: Charles D. Richards
- Succeeded by: Allison Dysart

MLA for Saint John City
- In office June 20, 1912 – October 9, 1920 Serving with John Edward Wilson, John R. Campbell, Charles B. Lockhart, Frank L. Potts, William Francis Roberts
- Preceded by: Robert Maxwell
- Succeeded by: Robert Thomas Hayes
- In office August 10, 1925 – June 27, 1935 Serving with James Lewis, Walter W. White, W. Henry Harrison, Miles E. Agar, William Francis Roberts, William Francis Roberts
- Preceded by: Walter E. Foster
- Succeeded by: A. P. Paterson

Personal details
- Born: May 21, 1870 Ottawa, Ontario, Canada
- Died: December 26, 1947 (aged 77) Saint John, New Brunswick, Canada
- Party: Conservative
- Spouse: Laura Tremaine Richardson (m. 1903)
- Relations: DeWolf family
- Parent: Samuel Leonard Tilley (father)

Leonard Percy de Wolfe Tilley (May 21, 1870 – December 26, 1947) was a New Brunswick lawyer, politician and the 21st premier of New Brunswick.

Tilley was born in Ottawa, Ontario, Canada the son of Samuel Leonard Tilley, one of the Fathers of Confederation, and Alice Starr (Chipman) Tilley (1844-1921). He grew up in Ottawa and Fredericton. Tilley was educated at the University of New Brunswick and then studied law at Dalhousie Law School. He articled in law with Sir Frederick Barker, was called to the bar in 1893 and set up practice in Saint John. He also served as a captain in the militia and was Chief Recruiting Officer for the province in 1914.

Tilley was elected to the provincial legislature in 1916 as a Conservative MLA and became a cabinet minister in 1925 under Premier John B. M. Baxter. In 1931 Baxter's successor, Charles D. Richards made Tilley Minister of Lands and Mines, a position he held until succeeding Richards in 1933 as Premier. The Conservative government, despite two changes in premiers, was unable to deal with the Great Depression or maintain public confidence and Tilley's government was defeated in the 1935 election.

During the federal Liberal-Conservative Party's 1927 national convention in Winnipeg, Tilley was chosen to nominate R. B. Bennett as one of six leadership candidates. Bennett was an old friend with whom he had attended both elementary school and university. Tilley's endorsement of Bennett was blunt and prescient: "I nominate a gentleman whom, I believe, will be a winner." Bennett won the leadership race and became Prime Minister three years later.

After leaving politics, Tilley became a county court judge for King and Albert Counties serving from 1935 to 1945. He also served as Admiralty Judge for New Brunswick.

Tilley died in Saint John, New Brunswick, Canada, at the age of 77.

New Brunswick provincial government of Charles D. Richards
Cabinet post (1)
| Predecessor | Office | Successor |
|---|---|---|
| Charles D. Richards | Minister of Lands and Mines; 1931-1935 | Frederick W. Pirie |
New Brunswick provincial government of John B. M. Baxter
Cabinet post (1)
| Predecessor | Office | Successor |
| | President of the Executive Council; 1925-1931 | |
