= George Perley =

George Perley may refer to:

- George A. Perley (1843–1934), Canadian politician in Legislative Assembly of New Brunswick
- George Halsey Perley (1857–1938), American-born Canadian politician and diplomat
