= Charles Blakeney =

Charles Blakeney may refer to:

- Charles Blakeney (Canadian politician) (1888–1961), newspaper owner and political figure in New Brunswick, Canada
- Charles Blakeney (Australian politician) (1802–1876), judge and politician in Queensland, Australia
