= George L. Keith =

Canadian politician (1924–2012)

Member of the Legislative Assembly of New Brunswick
- In office 1957–1963
- Constituency: Saint John City

Personal details
- Born: December 27, 1924 Saint John, New Brunswick
- Died: March 9, 2012 (aged 87) Saint John, New Brunswick
- Party: Progressive Conservative Party of New Brunswick
- Spouse: Rita Shirley Mae Lewis
- Children: 5
- Occupation: Life underwriter

George Leornard Keith (December 27, 1924 – March 9, 2012) was a Canadian politician. He served in the Legislative Assembly of New Brunswick as a member of the Progressive Conservative Party from 1957 to 1963.
