= John D. MacCallum =

Canadian politician

Member of the Legislative Assembly of New Brunswick
- In office 1963–1967
- Constituency: Saint John Centre

Personal details
- Born: July 13, 1918 Pictou Island, Nova Scotia
- Died: May 23, 1982 (aged 63) Saint John, New Brunswick
- Party: New Brunswick Liberal Association
- Spouse: Shirley Constance Wills
- Children: 3
- Occupation: lawyer

John Duncan MacCallum (July 13, 1918 – May 23, 1982) was a Canadian politician. He served in the Legislative Assembly of New Brunswick from 1963 to 1967 as member of the Liberal party.
