= James P. McInerney =

Canadian politician (1859–1912)

Member of the Legislative Assembly of New Brunswick
- In office 1908–1912 Serving with Robert Maxwell, John Wilson, Warren Franklin Hatheway
- Constituency: Saint John City

Personal details
- Born: March 24, 1859 Rexton, New Brunswick
- Died: August 8, 1912 (aged 53) Saint John, New Brunswick
- Party: Independent
- Spouse: Florence Mary Travers (m. 1889)
- Children: 7
- Education: McGill University
- Occupation: Physician and surgeon

James Peterson McInerney (March 24, 1859 – August 8, 1912) was a Canadian politician. He served in the Legislative Assembly of New Brunswick from 1908 to 1912 as an independent member.
