= S. Roy Kelly =

Canadian politician (1897–1990)

Member of the Legislative Assembly of New Brunswick
- In office 1948–1952
- Constituency: Saint John City

Personal details
- Born: January 3, 1897 Saint John, New Brunswick
- Died: February 1, 1990 (aged 93) Ottawa, Ontario
- Party: New Brunswick Liberal Association
- Spouse: Gertrude Julia Cullinan
- Occupation: lawyer

Stephen Roy Kelly (January 3, 1897 – February 1, 1990) was a Canadian politician. He served in the Legislative Assembly of New Brunswick as member of the New Brunswick Liberal Association from 1948 to 1952.
