= D. Wetmore Pickett =

Canadian politician

Member of the Legislative Assembly of New Brunswick
- In office 1921–1925 Serving with George W. Warnock
- Constituency: Victoria

Personal details
- Born: December 24, 1865 Andover, New Brunswick
- Died: November 20, 1933 (aged 67) Andover, New Brunswick
- Party: United Farmers of New Brunswick
- Spouse: Bertha Bedell (m. 1895)
- Children: 3
- Occupation: Farmer

David Wetmore Pickett (December 24, 1865 – November 30, 1933) was a Canadian politician. He served in the Legislative Assembly of New Brunswick from 1921 to 1925 as member of the United Farmers. He died in 1933.
