= Robert Maxwell (New Brunswick politician) =

Canadian politician (1858–1914)

Member of the Legislative Assembly of New Brunswick
- In office 1905–1912 Serving with James P. McInerney, John Wilson, Warren Franklin Hatheway
- Constituency: Saint John City

Personal details
- Born: June 17, 1858 Fredericton, New Brunswick
- Died: August 23, 1914 (aged 56) Saint John, New Brunswick
- Party: Independent
- Spouse: Pamilea T. McConnell (m. 1878)

Robert Maxwell (June 17, 1858 – August 23, 1914) was a Canadian politician. He served in the Legislative Assembly of New Brunswick from 1905 to 1912 as an independent member.
