= W. Grant Smith =

Canadian politician (1893–1957)

Member of the Legislative Assembly of New Brunswick
- In office 1939–1948
- Constituency: Saint John City

Personal details
- Born: January 11, 1893 Saint John, New Brunswick
- Died: July 16, 1957 (aged 64) Saint John, New Brunswick
- Party: Progressive Conservative Party of New Brunswick
- Spouse: Elizabeth Barrie Haddow

William Grant Smith (January 11, 1893 – July 16, 1957) was a Canadian politician. He served in the Legislative Assembly of New Brunswick as member of the Progressive Conservative party from 1939 to 1948.
