= James Lewis (Canadian politician) =

Canadian politician

Member of the Legislative Assembly of New Brunswick
- In office 1925–1929
- Constituency: Saint John City

Personal details
- Born: August 29, 1854 Saint John, New Brunswick
- Died: May 23, 1929 (aged 74) Saint John, New Brunswick
- Party: Conservative Party of New Brunswick
- Spouse: Eleanor Leetch
- Children: six
- Occupation: manufacturer

James Lewis (August 29, 1854 – May 23, 1929) was a Canadian politician. He served in the Legislative Assembly of New Brunswick as member of the Conservative party representing Saint John City from 1925 to 1929.
