= Laurance T. Dow =

Canadian politician (1893–1956)

Member of the Legislative Assembly of New Brunswick
- In office 1944–1948
- Constituency: Saint John City

Personal details
- Born: February 13, 1893 Saint John, New Brunswick
- Died: March 29, 1956 (aged 63) Saint John, New Brunswick
- Party: Progressive Conservative Party of New Brunswick
- Spouse: Laura Gertrude Kilpatrick

Laurance Thomas Dow (February 13, 1893 – March 29, 1956) was a Canadian politician. He served in the Legislative Assembly of New Brunswick as member of the Progressive Conservative party from 1944 to 1948.
