= 38th New Brunswick general election =

The 38th New Brunswick general election may refer to

- the 1935 New Brunswick general election, the 38th overall general election for New Brunswick, for the 38th New Brunswick Legislative Assembly, but considered the 18th general election for the Canadian province of New Brunswick, or
- the 2014 New Brunswick general election, the 58th overall general election for New Brunswick, for the 58th New Brunswick Legislative Assembly, but considered the 38th general election for the Canadian province of New Brunswick.
