= Harold Gault =

Canadian politician (1896–1955)

Member of the Legislative Assembly of New Brunswick
- In office 1948–1952
- Constituency: Saint John City

Personal details
- Born: March 30, 1896 Saint John, New Brunswick
- Died: October 4, 1955 (aged 59) Westfield, New Brunswick
- Party: New Brunswick Liberal Association
- Spouse: Margaret Carleton
- Children: 3
- Occupation: business executive

Harold Burton Gault (March 30, 1896 – October 4, 1955) was a Canadian politician. He served in the Legislative Assembly of New Brunswick as member of the Liberal party from 1948 to 1952.
