= Stephen Weyman =

Medical doctor & Canadian politician

Stephen Weyman Dr.

Member of the Legislative Assembly of New Brunswick
- In office 1966–1967
- Constituency: Saint John Centre

63rd Mayor of Saint John, New Brunswick
- In office 1964–1966
- Preceded by: Eric Teed
- Succeeded by: Arthur L. Gould

Personal details
- Born: Stephen Henry Weyman; November 20, 1922 Saint John, New Brunswick
- Died: June 10, 1997 (aged 74) Hampton, New Brunswick
- Party: New Brunswick Liberal Association
- Spouse: Doris M. Allan
- Children: David E. Weyman
- Occupation: Physician

Stephen Henry Weyman (November 20, 1922 – June 10, 1997) was a Canadian paediatrician and politician. He served in the Legislative Assembly of New Brunswick from 1966 to 1967 as member of the Liberal party.
