= James A. Whitebone =

Canadian trade unionist and politician

James A. Whitebone MBE
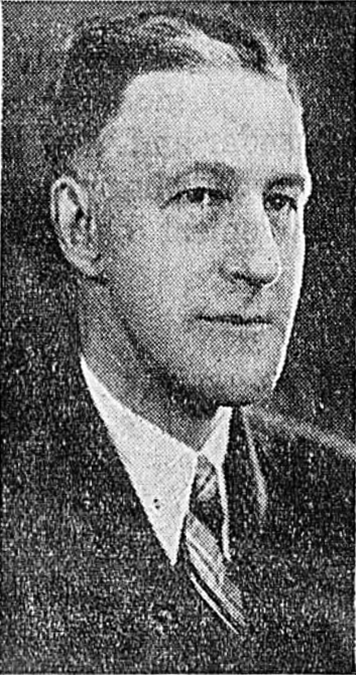
- Whitebone, pictured in a 1936 newspaper

61st Mayor of Saint John, New Brunswick
- In office September 7, 1960 – October 17, 1960
- Preceded by: David Laurence MacLaren
- Succeeded by: Eric Teed

Personal details
- Born: James Alexander Whitebone; May 31, 1894 Saint John, New Brunswick
- Died: February 17, 1970 (aged 75) Saint John, New Brunswick
- Spouse: Lillian Gertrude Lynch (m. 1918; died 1965)

James Alexander Whitebone (May 31, 1894 – February 17, 1970) was a Canadian trade unionist and municipal politician who served for 32 years as the president of the New Brunswick Federation of Labour, for which he was nicknamed New Brunswick's "Mr. Labour". He additionally served as the mayor of Saint John, New Brunswick from September to October 1960.

== Life and career ==
James Alexander Whitebone was born in Saint John, New Brunswick on May 31, 1894, to parents Jacob Whitebone and Sarah Pentland. He was educated within public schools in Saint John, after which he worked as a theatrical technician. Whitebone became a trade unionist in 1912 and joined the New Brunswick Federation of Labour in 1920, in which he served as the president for a total of 32 years, giving him the nickname as New Brunswick's "Mr. Labour". In 1946, he was appointed a Member of the Order of the British Empire.

In September 1960, Whitebone, as the deputy mayor, was appointed as the mayor of Saint John under the Civic Government Act for the remainder of David Laurence MacLaren's term following his death in office. He ran for the next mayoral election on October 17, 1960; among the topics he platformed himself on included supporting the amalgamation of Saint John with Lancaster and Simonds. He lost the vote and was succeeded by Eric Teed.

== Personal life and death ==
Whitebone married Lillian Gertrude Lynch in November 1918. They had no children, and his wife died in 1965. On February 17, 1970, Whitebone died at the Saint John General Hospital at the age of 75. He was interred at the Holy Cross Cemetery in Saint John West.
