= Louis Murphy (Canadian politician) =

Canadian politician

Member of the Legislative Assembly of New Brunswick
- In office 1978–1995
- Preceded by: John W. Turnbull
- Succeeded by: Elizabeth Weir
- Constituency: Saint John Harbour

Personal details
- Born: Louis Edward Murphy; September 24, 1913 Saint John, New Brunswick
- Died: 1995 (aged 81–82)
- Party: New Brunswick Liberal Association
- Occupation: civil servant

Louis Edward Murphy (September 24, 1913 – 1995) was a Canadian politician. He served in the Legislative Assembly of New Brunswick from 1978 to 1995 as a Liberal member from the constituency of Saint John Harbour.
