= Charles Blakeney (Canadian politician) =

Canadian politician

Mayor of Moncton
- In office 1929–1929

New Brunswick Minister of Education
- In office 1940–1948
- Preceded by: A. P. Paterson
- Succeeded by: James W. Brittain

Mayor of Moncton
- In office 1931–1934
- Preceded by: C. W. Redmond
- Succeeded by: Thomas H. King

Member of the Legislative Assembly of New Brunswick for Moncton
- In office 1935–1945

Personal details
- Born: December 2, 1888 New Brunswick
- Died: May 23, 1961 (aged 72) Moncton, New Brunswick
- Party: Liberal party

Charles Hanford Blakeney (December 2, 1888 – May 23, 1961) was a newspaper owner and political figure in New Brunswick, Canada. He represented the city of Moncton in the Legislative Assembly of New Brunswick from 1935 to 1945 as a Liberal member.

He was born in Moncton, New Brunswick to Sherman Blakeney and Alice Warman, and educated at Mount Allison University. In 1916, he married Lilith Lockhart. Blakeney was mayor of Moncton in 1929 and from 1931 to 1934. He also served as president of the Board of Trade. He was named to the province's Executive Council as Minister of Education in 1940.
