= J. Starr Tait =

Canadian politician (1885–1948)

Starr Tait

Member of the Legislative Assembly of New Brunswick
- In office 1939–1948
- Constituency: Saint John City

Personal details
- Born: December 5, 1885 Saint John, New Brunswick
- Died: August 20, 1948 (aged 62) Public Landing, New Brunswick
- Party: Progressive Conservative Party of New Brunswick
- Spouse: Laura Enid Poole
- Occupation: lawyer

James Starr Tait (December 5, 1885 – August 20, 1948) was a Canadian politician. He served in the Legislative Assembly of New Brunswick as member of the Progressive Conservative party from 1939 to 1948.
