= R. M. Pendrigh =

Member of the Legislative Assembly of New Brunswick
- In office 1960–1963
- Constituency: Saint John Centre

Personal details
- Born: Robert Murray Pendrigh; September 5, 1897 Yarmouth, Nova Scotia
- Died: January 18, 1978 (aged 80) Saint John, New Brunswick
- Party: Progressive Conservative Party of New Brunswick
- Education: McGill University
- Occupation: physician

Robert Murray Pendrigh (September 5, 1897 – January 18, 1978) was a Canadian politician. He served in the Legislative Assembly of New Brunswick as member of the Progressive Conservative party from 1960 to 1963.
