= Henry Irwin (Canadian politician) =

Canadian politician

The Honourable Henry Irwin

Member of the Legislative Assembly of New Brunswick for Charlotte County
- In office 1960–1967

New Brunswick Minister of Education
- In office 1960–1966
- Succeeded by: W. Wynn Meldrum

Member of the St. Andrew's Town council
- In office ?–1956

New Brunswick Chief Electoral Officer
- In office 1991–1991

Personal details
- Born: Henry Gilbert Irwin; March 1, 1925 New Brunswick, Canada
- Died: January 31, 2011 (aged 85) New Brunswick, Canada

Henry Gilbert Irwin (March 21, 1925 – January 31, 2011) was a Canadian political figure in New Brunswick, Canada. He represented Charlotte County in the Legislative Assembly of New Brunswick from 1960 to 1967 as a Liberal member.

He was born in Chamcook, New Brunswick, the son of George Lawson Irwin and Mary Craig. Irwin was educated at the University of New Brunswick. In 1953, he married Madeline Maclean Meating. He served on the town council for Saint Andrews, New Brunswick. Irwin was an unsuccessful candidate for a seat in the provincial assembly in 1956. He served as Minister of Education from 1960 to 1966. Irwin was chief electoral officer for the province in 1991 He died at a hospital in St. Stephen, New Brunswick in 2011.
