= Thomas Barlow (merchant) =

Canadian businessman and politician

Thomas Barlow (1788 – 9 December 1844) was a businessman and politician active in the Colony of New Brunswick.
