= George Frederick Phillips =

U.S. Medal of Honor recipient

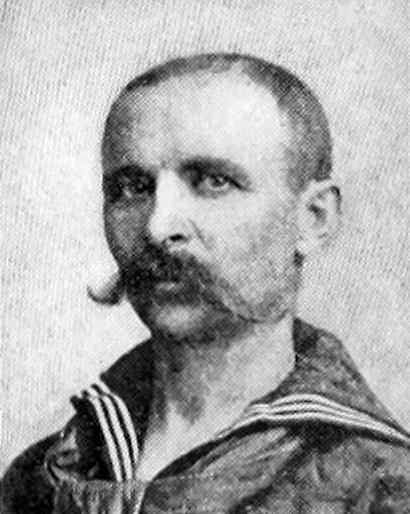
- Born: March 8, 1862; Coles Island, New Brunswick
- Died: June 4, 1904 (aged 42); Cambridge, Massachusetts
- Burial place: Fernhill Cemetery Saint John, New Brunswick
- Military career
- Allegiance: United States
- Branch: United States Navy
- Service years: 1898–1903
- Rank: Machinist First Class
- Units: USS Merrimac
- Conflicts: Spanish–American War
- Awards: Medal of Honor

George Frederick Phillips (March 8, 1862 – June 4, 1904) was a U.S. Navy Machinist First Class who received the Medal of Honor for his actions during the Spanish–American War in 1899.

== Background ==
Phillips was born to Andrew and Elizabeth Ross Phillips, both natives of Ireland. He began his professional life as a mechanic for the Intercolonial Railway in Moncton. Phillips later worked on liners for the Mallory Steamship Company between New York and Texas.

== U.S. military service in the Spanish American War ==
Phillips went to Galveston, Texas, where he joined the United States Navy in March 1898.

During the Spanish–American War he was aboard a ship that made its way to the entrance to the harbor at Santiago de Cuba. There, the USS Merrimac, a 3362-ton collier, was supplying coal to U.S. warships. On June 3, 1898, in a daring attempt to bottle up the Spanish cruiser squadron, the Merrimac was scuttled inside the entrance of Santiago Harbor in an attempt to block the passage of the Spanish fleet headed by Admiral Cervera. Under heavy fire from the Spanish shore batteries, Machinist First Class Phillips displayed extraordinary heroism throughout this operation. He and seven of his fellow sailors were captured as prisoners of war and were released a month later with American victory.

In recognition of his valor, on November 2, 1899, he was awarded the Medal of Honor, the highest United States military decoration.

== Discharge and death ==
Phillips was discharged from the Navy in August 1903, and died in 1904 at the age of 42 in Cambridge, Massachusetts; his body was returned home to Canada where he was interred in the Fernhill Cemetery in his hometown of Saint John, New Brunswick.

== Medal of Honor citation ==
Rank and organization: Machinist First Class, U.S. Navy. Born: March 9, 1864, Coles Island, New Brunswick, Canada. Accredited to: New York. G.O. No.: 529, November 2, 1899.

Citation:

In connection with the sinking of the U.S.S. Merrimac at the entrance to the harbor of Santiago de Cuba 2 June 1898. Despite heavy fire from the Spanish shore batteries, Phillips displayed extraordinary heroism throughout this operation.

== See also ==
- List of Medal of Honor recipients
- List of Medal of Honor recipients for the Spanish–American War
