= J. Lorne McGuigan =

Canadian politician

Member of the Legislative Assembly of New Brunswick
- In office 1967–1974
- Constituency: Saint John Centre

Joseph Lorne McGuigan (born February 23, 1936) is a former Canadian politician. He served in the Legislative Assembly of New Brunswick from 1967 to 1974 from the electoral district of Saint John Centre as a member of the Progressive Conservative Party.
