= George W. Warnock =

Canadian politician (1869–1958)

Member of the Legislative Assembly of New Brunswick
- In office 1921–1925 Serving with D. Wetmore Pickett
- Constituency: Victoria

Personal details
- Born: May 4, 1869 Nova Scotia
- Died: November 20, 1958 (aged 89) Drummond, New Brunswick
- Party: United Farmers of New Brunswick
- Spouse: Isabella J. Forbes (m. 1901)
- Children: 3
- Occupation: Farmer, lumberman

George Walker Warnock (May 4, 1869 – November 20, 1958) was a Canadian politician. He served in the Legislative Assembly of New Brunswick from 1921 to 1925 as member of the United Farmers. He died in 1958.
