= E. J. Henneberry =

Canadian politician (1890–1953)

Member of the Legislative Assembly of New Brunswick
- In office 1935–1939
- Constituency: Saint John Centre

Personal details
- Born: August 29, 1890 Saint John, New Brunswick
- Died: September 9, 1953 (aged 63) Saint John, New Brunswick
- Party: New Brunswick Liberal Association
- Spouse: Ethel Isabel McAvity
- Occupation: lawyer

Edward Jerome Henneberry (August 29, 1890 – September 9, 1953) was a Canadian politician. He served in the Legislative Assembly of New Brunswick as member of the Liberal party from 1935 to 1939.
