= Walter W. V. Foster =

Canadian politician (1908–1944)

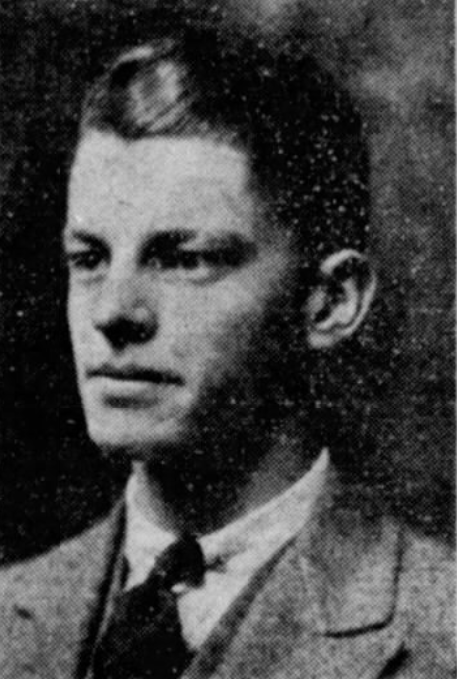

Member of the Legislative Assembly of New Brunswick
- In office 1935–1939
- Constituency: Kings

Personal details
- Born: June 19, 1908 Saint John, New Brunswick
- Died: May 10, 1944 (aged 35) Taplow, Buckinghamshire, England
- Party: New Brunswick Liberal Association
- Occupation: lawyer

Walter William Vassie Foster (June 19, 1908 – May 10, 1944) was a Canadian politician. He served in the Legislative Assembly of New Brunswick as member of the Liberal party from 1935 to 1939. He was the son of Walter Edward Foster.

Foster served with the Canadian Army Royal Canadian Artillery during World War II and died in combat.
