= John W. Turnbull =

Canadian politician, lawyer, and judge (1936–2020)

John Turnbull

Member of the Legislative Assembly of New Brunswick
- In office 1974–1978
- Preceded by: none, first member
- Succeeded by: Louis Murphy
- Constituency: Saint John Harbour

Personal details
- Born: John Wallace Turnbull; January 8, 1936 Montreal, Quebec, Canada
- Died: May 19, 2020 (aged 84) New Brunswick, Canada
- Party: New Brunswick Liberal Association
- Spouse: Kathryn Maude Mutch
- Children: 3
- Occupation: lawyer

John Wallace Turnbull (January 8, 1936 – May 19, 2020) was a Canadian politician, lawyer and judge. He served in the Legislative Assembly of New Brunswick from 1974 to 1978 as a Liberal member from the constituency of Saint John Harbour. He was appointed to the Supreme Court of New Brunswick (Court of Queen's Bench) in 1983.
