= Willard M. Mitchell =

Canadian artist

Willard Morse Mitchell
- Born: February 14, 1879; Saint John, New Brunswick, Canada
- Died: June 15, 1955 (aged 76)
- Education: Rothesay Collegiate
- Occupation: Architect

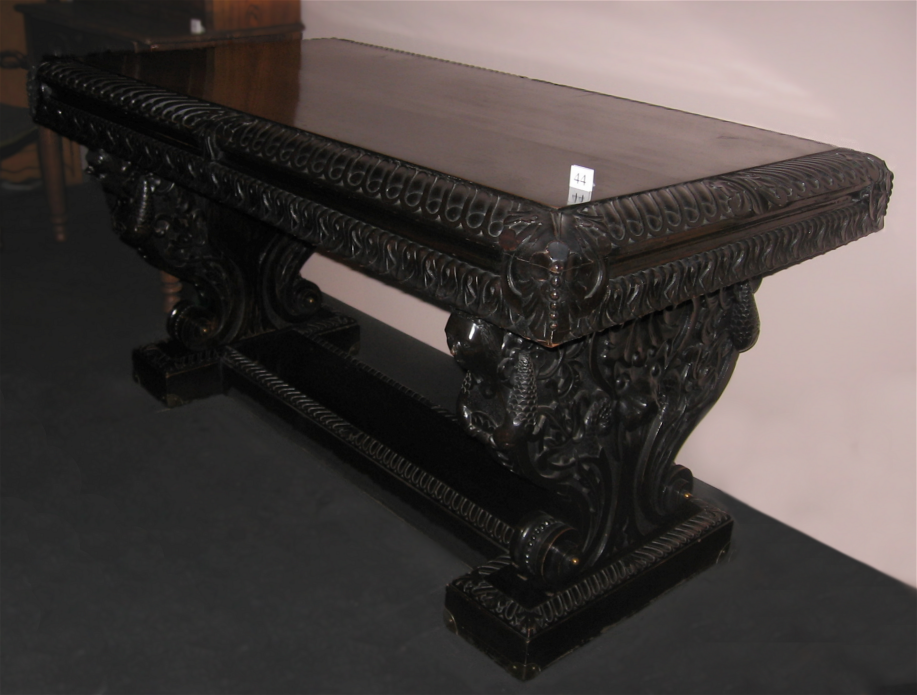
Table built by Willard M. Mitchell ca. 1920. Photographed at the New Brunswick Museum.

Willard Morse Mitchell (February 14, 1879 – June 15, 1955) was a Canadian artist and architect best known for his miniature watercolour paintings. They were mostly nature scenes.

He was born in Saint John, New Brunswick, being the youngest of six children. He attended Rothesay Collegiate and later studied art and architecture in Saint John. He was married in 1904 and that year he moved to Amherst, Nova Scotia. For nearly two decades, he worked as an architect and made paintings in Amherst. He moved to Belleville, Ontario in 1923 and in 1927 he removed to Montreal where he focused exclusively on the sale of his art as souvenir pieces. He died in Montreal in 1955.

He is noted for painting very small pieces of art, often no more than 150 square centimetres in size. Many of his latter works depict scenes from rural Quebec. He made his own hand-carved frames and printed paper backings for his pieces that told the story behind the scene depicted; thus he made several versions of the same picture. Mitchell would copy his most popular scenes using carbon paper on top of watercolour paper, making each scene appear as an original.

== Watercolours ==
It is said Mitchell made upwards of 100 each of his most appreciated pictures. These competent works are actively sought out by collectors. Known titles include:

- *Manoir Richelieu at Murray Bay, PQ'Canada', 2"x3",
- *Cape Trinity from Cape Eternity, on the Saguenay River, PQ'Canada', 2"x3",
- *Indian Church, Tadoussac, PQ, P.Q., 2"x3",
- The Old Indian Church, Tadoussac, PQ,
- A view of the log Chateau of the Seigniory Club at Montebello, P.Q.,
- *A Turn in the Road near Manoir Richelieu, Murray Bay, P.Q., 3"x4",
- Old Time Bookstore (St. Catherines Street, Montreal),
- *An Old Fashioned Caleche, P.Q., 3"x4",
- *Cape Trinity, on the Saguenay River, P.Q by moonlight, P.Q., 2"x3",
- Dutch fishing boats becalmed at sunset,
- The famous little Bonsecour church in Montréal, P.Q.,
- Slow moving ox,
- *The French habitant still likes his clay-covered bake oven, P.Q., 3"x4",
- *The Island of Orleans, P.Q., 4"x5",
- The Little Red Sleigh,
- St. Jovite, P.Q.: Skiers in a winter afternoon in St. Jovite,
- The famous Quebec Bridge over the St. Lawrence near Quebec City,
- *Ripple of the tide kept up a quiet conversation with the shore, Thousand Islands, 3"x4",
- *Water gigglin at the sunlight, Alexandria Bay, 3"x4",
- *Wrought iron trees against stain glass sky, Thousand Islands, 3"x4",
- McGill College, Montreal: The main entrance gates to the grounds of McGill College,
- *Eastern Township, P.Q.: Charming scene showing the St. Francis River, P.Q., 2"x3",
- *The Chateau de Ramezay, Montreal, P.Q., 3"x4",
- *Cap Eternity, Saguenay, P.Q., 2"x3",
- Gaspé,
- Laurentian Farm,
- Laurentian Skier,3"x4","Nowadays, the most enthralling form of outdoor activity is skiing, and Quebec is more enthusiastic than most places. 1943, P.Q.,
- Beautiful Lac Guidon, Shawbridge, P.Q.,
- Skiers, 3"x4", "The dazzling white blanket that had been spread across the valley and tucked into the tall pines on the hills",
- Lake L'Achigan in the Laurentian Mountains, P.Q.,
- Landscape at beautiful Lac Mercier, 1951, P.Q.,
- Beautiful Lac Tremblant, P.Q.,
- *The famous village of Percé, P.Q., 3"x4",
- *famous Tantramar hay marshes at Amherst, Nova Scotia, Canada., 2.5"x3.5",
- *A view of the bob-sleigh run at Murray Bay, P.Q., 3"x4",
- *Idle Moments, 12"x9.5"
- *Percé Rock, 4"x3"
- *Val Morin, 4"x3"
- *Dominion Square, Montreal, Quebec 3"x4", 1951
- *Victoria Jubilee Bridge, 4"x3"
- *Christ Church Cathedral, Montréal, Quebec, 3"x4"
- *Late Snow Over Beautiful Lake Raymond, Val Morin Station, 1944, Genuine, signed water color, hand carved frame, 3"x4"

== Other work ==
His furniture designs were also notable. One of his pieces (ca. 1920) was purchased for the permanent collection of the New Brunswick Museum in 1994.
