= Charles B. Lockhart =

Canadian politician

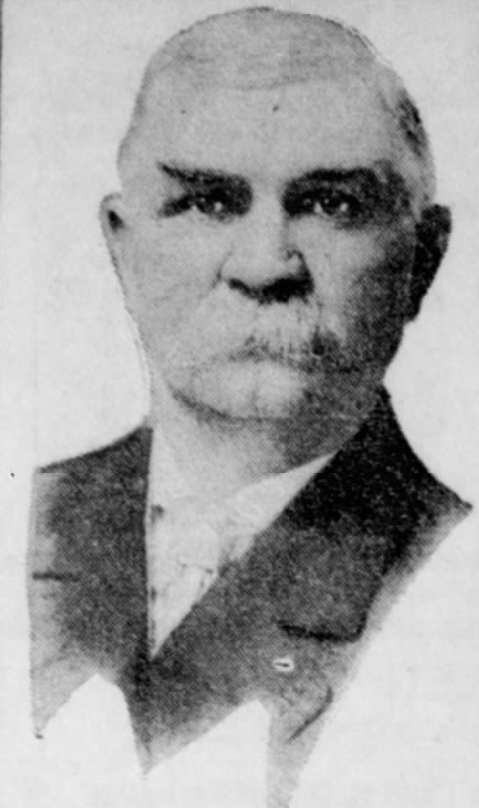

Member of the Legislative Assembly of New Brunswick
- In office 1896–1899 Serving with Silas Alward, Alfred Augustus Stockton, William Shaw
- In office 1912–1917 Serving with Phillip Grammen, Leonard Percy de Wolfe Tilley, John E. Wilson
- Constituency: Saint John City

Personal details
- Born: February 14, 1855 Moncton, New Brunswick
- Died: September 4, 1948 (aged 93) Saint John, New Brunswick
- Party: Conservative Party of New Brunswick
- Spouse: Theodosia Hartt (m. 1884)
- Occupation: merchant

Charles Berton Lockhart (February 14, 1855 – September 4, 1948) was a merchant and political figure in New Brunswick, Canada. He represented the City of St. John in the Legislative Assembly of New Brunswick from 1896 to 1899 and from 1912 to 1916 as a Conservative member.

== Personal life ==
He was born in Moncton, New Brunswick, the son of Charles Dixon Lockhart, of Scottish descent, and Hannah Read, and was educated there. In 1884, he married Theodosia Hartt.

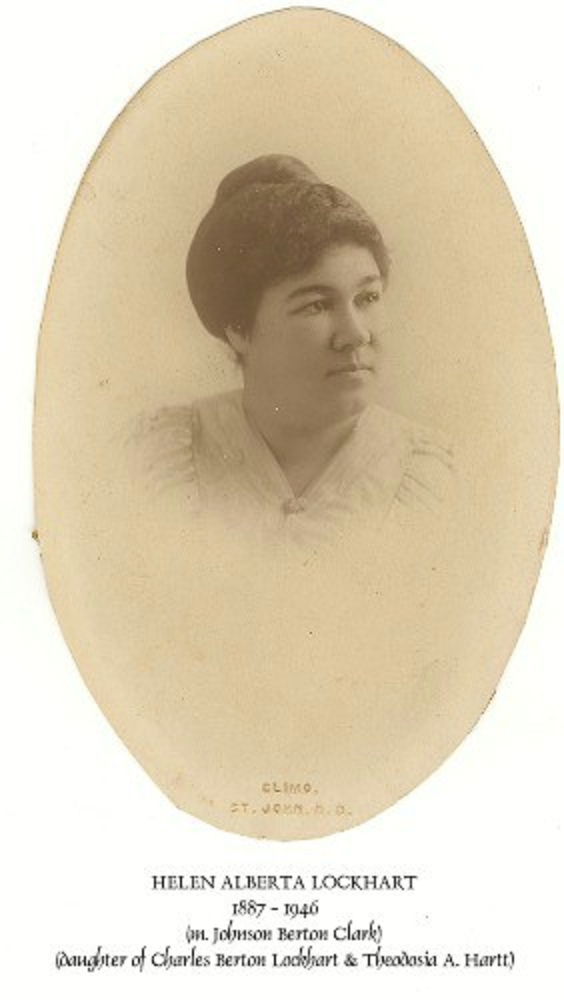
Charles Lockhart's daughter, Helen Alberta Lockhart

== Career ==
He served on Saint John City Council and also on the school board for 16 years. He was involved in the grocery business for several years before becoming a manager for an insurance company. Lockhart was a collector of customs in Saint John from 1916 to 1928. He was a commissioner of the Saint John General Hospital as well as the chairman of the Saint John Returned Soldiers Committee after World War I.

== Death ==
Charles Lockhart died at the age of 93 in the Saint John General Hospital on September 4 in the morning.
