= Jacob Valentine Troop =

Canadian politician (1809–1881)

Jacob Valentine Troop (July 28, 1809 – October 3, 1881) was a merchant, ship owner and political figure in New Brunswick. He represented the City of Saint John in the Legislative Assembly of New Brunswick from 1865 to 1866.

He was born in Granville Ferry, Nova Scotia, the son of Valentine Troop and Tamar Bath. In 1838, he married Catherine Fellows. Not long after that, he moved to Saint John, New Brunswick where he opened a general store. He also became owner or part owner of a number of ships trading with the West Indies. His company, Troop and Son, later became involved in trans-Atlantic shipping and also acted as agent for a number of shipping lines. Troop was also a director of the Commercial Bank of New Brunswick and the Maritime Bank of the Dominion of Canada. He opposed Confederation and was defeated in the 1866 provincial election. Troop died in Saint John at the age of 72 after suffering injuries in a fall.

His son Howard Douglas took over the operation of the company after his death.
