= Amos Edwin Botsford =

Canadian politician (1804–1894)

The Honourable Amos Edwin Botsford PC
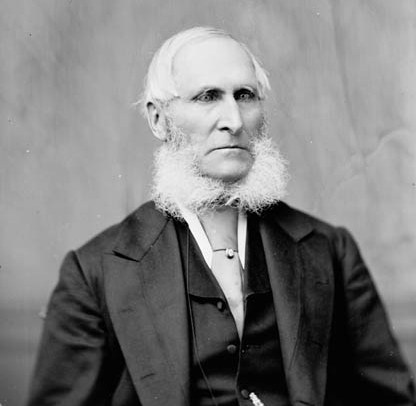

Member of the Legislative Council of New Brunswick
- In office 1833–1866

Senator for New Brunswick, New Brunswick
- In office October 23, 1867 – March 19, 1894
- Appointed by: Royal Proclamation

Speaker of the Senate of Canada
- In office June 3, 1872 – June 5, 1872
- Preceded by: Joseph-Édouard Cauchon
- Succeeded by: Joseph-Édouard Cauchon
- In office February 16, 1880 – April 18, 1880
- Preceded by: David Lewis Macpherson
- Succeeded by: David Lewis Macpherson

Personal details
- Born: September 25, 1804 Saint John, New Brunswick
- Died: March 22, 1894 (aged 89) Sackville, New Brunswick
- Resting place: Fernhill Cemetery
- Party: Conservative
- Relations: William Botsford, father

Amos Edwin Botsford, PC (September 25, 1804 – March 19, 1894) was a Canadian farmer, judge, politician, and businessman.

Born in Saint John, New Brunswick, the son of William Botsford, and moved with his family to Westcock in 1808. He was a justice of the peace and a senior judge for the Inferior Court of Common Pleas in Westmorland County. He served in the county militia, reaching the rank of lieutenant-colonel. Botsford was named to the province's Legislative Council, serving from 1833 to 1866; he also served as a member of the Executive Council from 1838 to 1840. He supported Confederation and, in 1867, he was appointed to the Senate representing the senatorial division of New Brunswick. He served as speaker in 1872 and 1880. A Conservative member, he died in office in 1894. He is buried in Fernhill Cemetery.

Botsford also helped establish the New Brunswick and Prince Edward Railway Company in 1874 and served as its president. Lieutenant Colonel Botsford was the founding President of the Dominion of Canada Rifle Association in 1868.
