= Alexander Dyas =

Canadian politician and physician

Alexander Douglas Dyas (January 21, 1886 – February 22, 1958) was a physician and political figure in New Brunswick, Canada. He represented Charlotte County in the Legislative Assembly of New Brunswick from 1935 to 1944 as a Liberal member.

He was born in Parrsboro, Nova Scotia, the son of Alexander H. Dyas and Cecilia Hazel. He was educated at Acadia University and the University of Cincinnati. Dyas served as a captain in a field ambulance unit during World War I. In 1919, he married Gladys Henrietta Blair.
