= David Laurence MacLaren =

Canadian politician

The Honourable David Laurence MacLaren PC
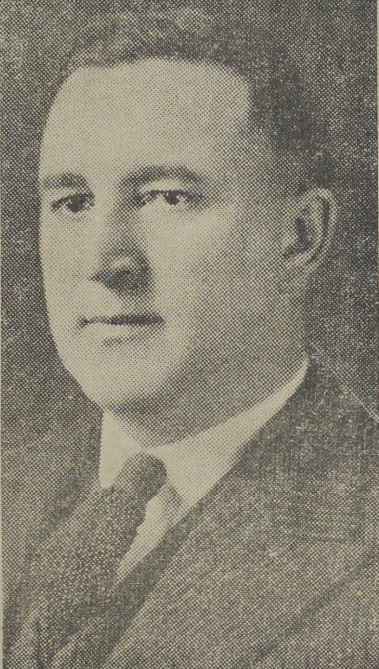
- MacLaren, pictured in a 1936 newspaper

20th Lieutenant Governor of New Brunswick
- In office November 1, 1945 – June 5, 1958
- Monarchs: George VI; Elizabeth II
- Governors General: The Earl of Athlone; The Viscount Alexander of Tunis; Vincent Massey
- Premier: John B. McNair; Hugh John Flemming
- Preceded by: William George Clark
- Succeeded by: Joseph Leonard O'Brien

52nd Mayor of Saint John, New Brunswick
- In office 1936–1940
- Preceded by: James W. Brittain
- Succeeded by: Charles R. Wasson

60th Mayor of Saint John, New Brunswick
- In office 1958 – September 7, 1960
- Preceded by: William W. Macaulay
- Succeeded by: James A. Whitebone

Personal details
- Born: October 27, 1893 Saint John, New Brunswick, Canada
- Died: September 7, 1960 (aged 66) Fredericton, New Brunswick, Canada
- Party: Liberal
- Occupation: Gentleman
- Profession: Politician
- Military career
- Allegiance: Canada
- Branch: Canadian Expeditionary Force
- Service years: 1916-1917
- Rank: Lieutenant
- Unit: Royal Canadian Artillery
- Conflicts: Vimy Ridge

David Laurence MacLaren PC (October 27, 1893 – September 7, 1960) was a Canadian politician and the 20th Lieutenant Governor of New Brunswick.

Born in Saint John, New Brunswick, he was appointed Minister of National Revenue in April 1945 in the Liberal cabinet of Mackenzie King. He was defeated in the 1945 election in the riding of St. John—Albert. From 1945 until 1958, he was the Lieutenant-Governor of New Brunswick. He was elected mayor of Saint John again in 1958, and held the position until his death.

During World War I, he enlisted and served in the Canadian Expeditionary Force with the Royal Canadian Artillery, 7th Siege Battery. He fought at the Battle of Vimy Ridge, where he took a gunshot wound which necessitated the removal of his right leg above the knee. He recovered and received an artificial leg.
