= Foster Calder =

Canadian politician

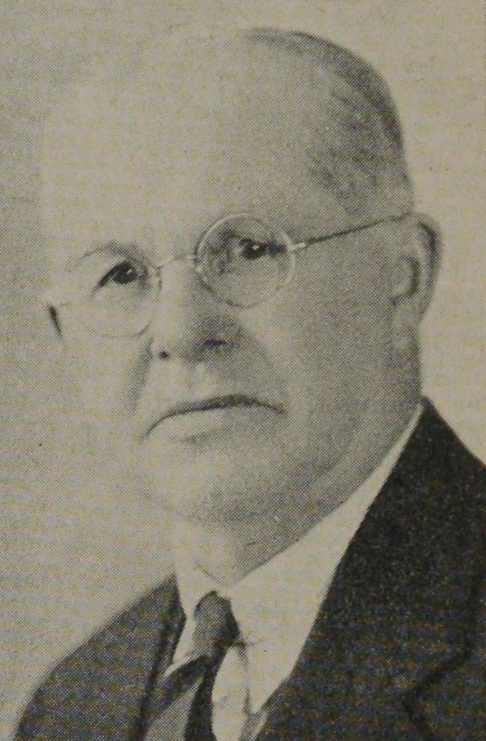
- Calder, pictured in a 1944 newspaper

Member of the Legislative Assembly of New Brunswick
- In office 1935–1944
- Constituency: Kings

Personal details
- Born: February 11, 1873 Fairhaven, New Brunswick
- Died: January 12, 1960 (aged 86) Fairhaven, New Brunswick
- Party: New Brunswick Liberal Association
- Spouse: Ella Cossaboom
- Occupation: teacher

Foster Gilmore Calder (February 11, 1873 – January 12, 1960) was a Canadian politician. He served in the Legislative Assembly of New Brunswick as member of the Liberal party from 1935 to 1944.
