= George A. Perley =

Canadian politician (1843–1934)

Member of the Legislative Assembly of New Brunswick
- In office 1911–1917 Serving with Parker Glasier
- Constituency: Westmorland

Personal details
- Born: April 11, 1843 Blissville, New Brunswick
- Died: March 6, 1934 (aged 90) Florenceville, New Brunswick
- Party: Independent
- Children: 1
- Occupation: farmer

George A. Perley (April 11, 1843 – March 6, 1934) was a Canadian politician. He served in the Legislative Assembly of New Brunswick from 1911 to 1917 as an independent member. He died in 1936.
