= Horace A. Porter =

Canadian politician

Member of the Legislative Assembly of New Brunswick
- In office 1935–1939
- Constituency: Saint John Centre

Personal details
- Born: July 20, 1879 London, England
- Died: January 13, 1953 (aged 73) Rothesay, New Brunswick
- Party: New Brunswick Liberal Association
- Spouse: Ethel Isabel McAvity
- Children: 3
- Occupation: lawyer

Horace Alfred Porter (July 20, 1879 – February 13, 1953) was a Canadian politician. He served in the Legislative Assembly of New Brunswick as member of the Liberal party from 1935 to 1939.
