= John F. Tweeddale =

Canadian politician

Member of the Legislative Assembly of New Brunswick
- In office 1903–1912 Serving with James Burgess Jr.
- In office 1917–1920 Serving with James Burgess Jr., Walter Edward Foster
- Constituency: Victoria

Personal details
- Born: December 18, 1855 Fredericton, New Brunswick
- Died: December 30, 1948 (aged 93) Arthurette, New Brunswick
- Party: New Brunswick Liberal Association
- Spouse: Joan Campbell (m. 1880)
- Children: 4
- Occupation: Farmer

John Fletcher Tweeddale (December 18, 1855 – December 30, 1948) was a Canadian politician. He served in the Legislative Assembly of New Brunswick from 1903 to 1912 and 1917 to 1920 as member of the Liberal party. He died in 1948, aged 93.
