= James W. Brittain =

Canadian politician (1886–1961)

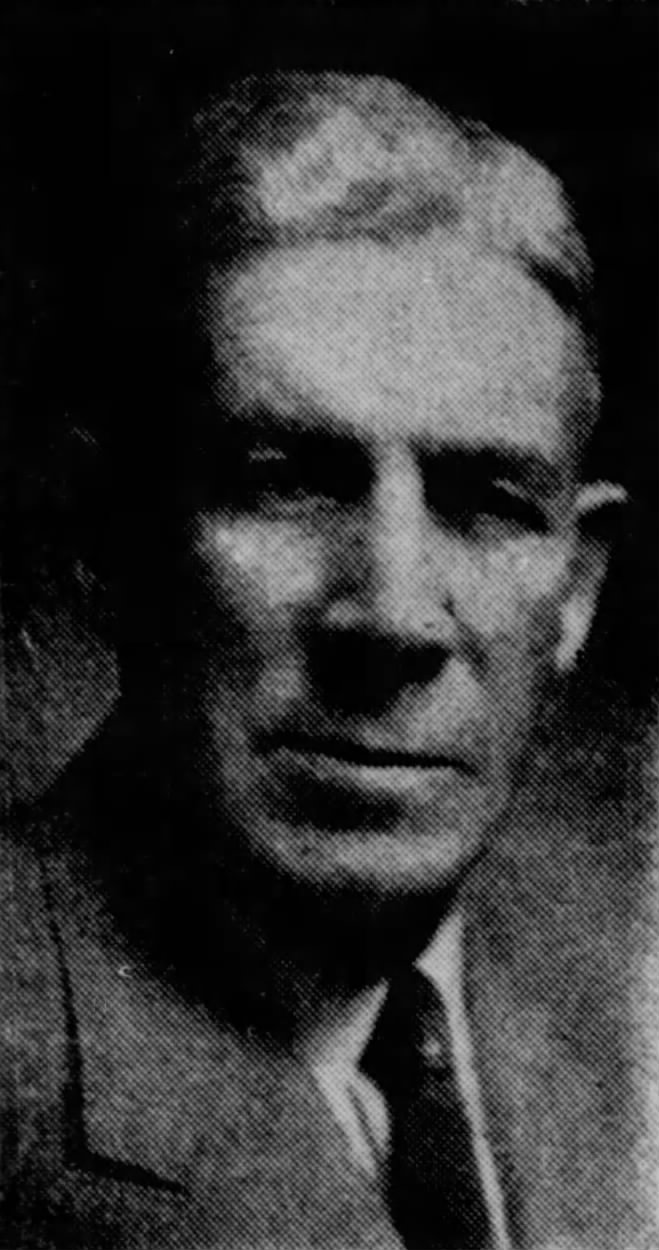
- Brittain, pictured in a 1948 newspaper

Member of the Legislative Assembly of New Brunswick
- In office 1948–1952
- Constituency: Saint John City

51st Mayor of Saint John, New Brunswick
- In office 1932–1936
- Preceded by: Walter W. White
- Succeeded by: David Laurence MacLaren

Personal details
- Born: February 8, 1886 Saint John, New Brunswick
- Died: March 12, 1961 (aged 75) Lorneville, New Brunswick
- Party: New Brunswick Liberal Association
- Spouse(s): Annie Thomas; Marion Gertrude Christie
- Children: 3
- Occupation: steamship agent, broker, weigher, sampler

James Wetmore Brittain (February 8, 1886 – March 12, 1961) was a Canadian municipal and provincial politician. He served as the mayor of Saint John from 1932 to 1936, and he served in the Legislative Assembly of New Brunswick as member of the Liberal party from 1948 to 1952.

Brittain died at the age of 75 on March 12, 1961, having suffered a heart seizure while driving.
