= William Henry Harrison (Canadian politician) =

Canadian politician (1880–1955)

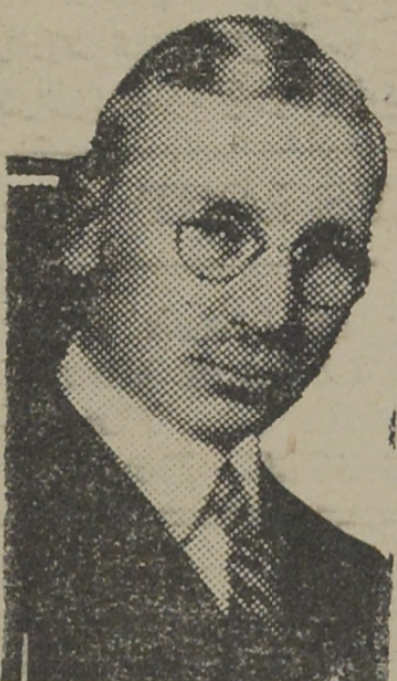
- Harrison, pictured in a 1935 newspaper

Member of the Legislative Assembly of New Brunswick
- In office 1925–1935
- Constituency: Saint John City

Personal details
- Born: September 25, 1880 Saint John, New Brunswick
- Died: July 18, 1955 (aged 74) Saint John, New Brunswick
- Party: Conservative Party of New Brunswick
- Spouse: Constance Roy Inches
- Children: Three
- Occupation: Lawyer, Judge

William Henry Harrison (September 25, 1880 – July 18, 1955) was a Canadian politician. He served in the Legislative Assembly of New Brunswick as member of the Conservative party representing Saint John City from 1925 to 1935, and was Attorney General of New Brunswick from 1933 to 1935.
