= Robert H. Carlin =

Canadian politician

Member of the Legislative Assembly of New Brunswick
- In office 1948–1952
- Constituency: Saint John City

Personal details
- Born: October 27, 1887 Saint John, New Brunswick
- Died: September 4, 1953 (aged 65) Sagwa, New Brunswick
- Party: New Brunswick Liberal Association
- Spouse: Margaret Beatrice Shannon
- Occupation: businessman

Robert Herbert Carlin (October 27, 1887 – September 4, 1953) was a Canadian politician. He served in the Legislative Assembly of New Brunswick as member of the Liberal party from 1948 to 1952.

On September 4, 1953, Carlin was killed in an automobile accident in Sagwa, New Brunswick. He was 65 years old.
