= Parker Glasier =

Canadian politician

Parker Glasier (January 23, 1849 – January 22, 1936) was a farmer, lumberman and political figure in New Brunswick. He represented Sunbury County in the Legislative Assembly of New Brunswick from 1899 to 1912 as a Conservative member.

He was born in Sunbury County, New Brunswick, the son of D.D. Glasier, and educated there and in Saint John. He was also a boat manager. Glasier married Miss Blake. He ran unsuccessfully for a seat in the provincial assembly in 1896. Glasier also served on the county council and was county warden.

== See also ==
- Politics of New Brunswick
