= George E. McInerney =

Canadian politician (1915–1972)

George Edward McInerney (August 7, 1915 – November 25, 1972) was a lawyer and political figure in New Brunswick, Canada. He represented the City of Saint John and then Saint John Centre in the Legislative Assembly of New Brunswick from 1952 to 1972 as a Progressive Conservative member.

He was born in Saint John, New Brunswick, the son of Frederick John McInerney and Annie Murphy. McInerney studied at Saint Francis Xavier University and the University of New Brunswick. In 1942, he married May Florence Stone. McInerney served overseas during World War II. McInerney died in office in 1972.
