= James Burgess Jr. =

Former Canadian politician

Member of the Legislative Assembly of New Brunswick
- In office 1903–1912 Serving with John F. Tweeddale
- In office 1917 Serving with John F. Tweeddale
- Constituency: Victoria

Personal details
- Born: September 26, 1957 New Brunswick
- Died: January 5, 1950 (aged 92) Grand Falls, New Brunswick
- Party: Liberal
- Spouse: Addie Berube
- Occupation: Lumberman

James Burgess Jr. (September 26, 1857 – January 5, 1950) was a Canadian politician. He served in the Legislative Assembly of New Brunswick as a member from Victoria County.
