= Aaron Alward =

Canadian politician

25th Mayor of Saint John, New Brunswick
- In office 1866–1870
- Preceded by: Isaac Woodward
- Succeeded by: Thomas M. Reed

Personal details
- Born: May 21, 1828 Salisbury, New Brunswick
- Died: April 13, 1886 (aged 57) Saint John, New Brunswick

Aaron Alward (May 21, 1828 – April 13, 1886) was a medical doctor and political figure in New Brunswick, Canada. He represented the City of Saint John in the Legislative Assembly of New Brunswick from 1870 to 1874.

He was born in Salisbury, New Brunswick, a descendant of United Empire Loyalists, and educated in Saint Stephen. He graduated in medicine at New York City and set up practice in Saint John. In 1860, Alward married Hattie Newel Smith. He served on the Saint John City Council and was mayor from 1866 to 1870. He was an unsuccessful candidate for a seat in the provincial assembly in 1882. He died in Saint John four years later.
