= Miles E. Agar =

Canadian politician (1858–1944)

Member of the Legislative Assembly of New Brunswick
- In office 1925–1935
- Constituency: Saint John City

Personal details
- Born: June 13, 1858 Saint John, New Brunswick
- Died: May 25, 1944 (aged 85) Saint John, New Brunswick
- Party: Conservative Party of New Brunswick
- Spouse: Margaret Allen
- Children: six
- Occupation: executive

Miles Edgar Agar (June 13, 1858 – May 25, 1944) was a Canadian politician. He served in the Legislative Assembly of New Brunswick as a member of the Conservative Party, representing Saint John City from 1925 to 1935.
