= Eric Teed =

Canadian lawyer, author, history, civil rights advocate and politician

62nd Mayor of Saint John, New Brunswick
- In office 1960–1964
- Preceded by: James A. Whitebone
- Succeeded by: Stephen Weyman

Personal details
- Born: Eric Lawrence Teed; April 19, 1926
- Died: December 30, 2010 (aged 84)

Eric Lawrence Teed, OC QC (May 19, 1926 – December 30, 2010) was a Canadian lawyer, author, historian, civil rights advocate and politician.

Born in Saint John, New Brunswick, he received a Bachelor of Science degree in 1947, a Bachelor of Civil Law degree in 1949 and a Bachelor of Arts degree in 1972, from the University of New Brunswick. He was called to the Bar of New Brunswick in 1949, he joined his family's Saint John law firm of Teed & Teed (established in 1884) and was a partner. He was appointed the honour of Queen's Counsel in 1966. He served as Commissioner of Inquiry into Municipal Labour Relations in 1986 and worked to establish the first Legal Aid clinic in the province. He retired in 2009.

Teed lectured on environmental, municipal, labour and civil liberties law at University of New Brunswick at Saint John (UNBSJ) . Founding Editor of the University of New Brunswick Law Journal.

He was elected to two terms as Mayor of Saint John from 1960 to 1964. He oversaw and approved

He was the Honorary Consul of Denmark in New Brunswick and was appointed a Knight of the Order of Dannebrog and awarded a Knight's Cross (member) of the Order of the Dannebrog for his many years service. Teed also served with the New Brunswick Scottish Regiment, attaining the rank of captain and received a Canadian Forces decoration of a "CD" for twelve years of service. Eric was a Freemason and a Past Master of Albion Lodge, and was an Honorary Member of the Bricklayers, Masons and Plasterers International Union.

He is the author of Canada's First City (1963) and Handbook for Commissioner of Oaths (1964).

In 1987, he was made an Officer of the Order of Canada for his years of community service and was awarded the Queen's Silver Jubilee Medal in 1977 and the Queen's 50th Jubilee Medal in 1992. Eric also received the Canada 125 medal as well as the Canadian Citation for Citizenship in 1994. Teed self-described as passionate about helping new Canadians and immigrants to Canada, Teed served as the past national president of the Canadian Citizenship Federation and received its Citizenship Merit Award.

His opinion, knowledge and expertise were sought concerning human rights and civil liberties. Involved in numerous organizations, he served as president of the Saint John Charter Rights and Civil Liberties Association, president of the John Howard Society of New Brunswick (Saint John Branch), founding member of the Elizabeth Fry Society, Secretary of the NB Human Rights Association, president of the Multicultural Association of Saint John, and Honorary Counsel for the NB Anti-Poverty Association.

Teed lived on Saint John's with his wife Lois and his five sons: Robert C.G., Peter E.L., John P. (Christopher), Terrence L.S. and David D.G.. He was a descendant of the Teeds of Rocklyn (Mariner George Teed) ( E.B. Chandler House) in Dorchester and of the Haningtons – loyalists who founded Shediac Cape, NB. Other ancestors and family relations include: John Francis Teed, master builder; Lawrence Young (IATA founding partner).

Teed was active in the Scout Canada movement and was the recipient of the National Scout Medal of Merit for services to the Scout Movement and the 35 years Scout service medal.

He died December 30, 2010, in Saint John, New Brunswick.

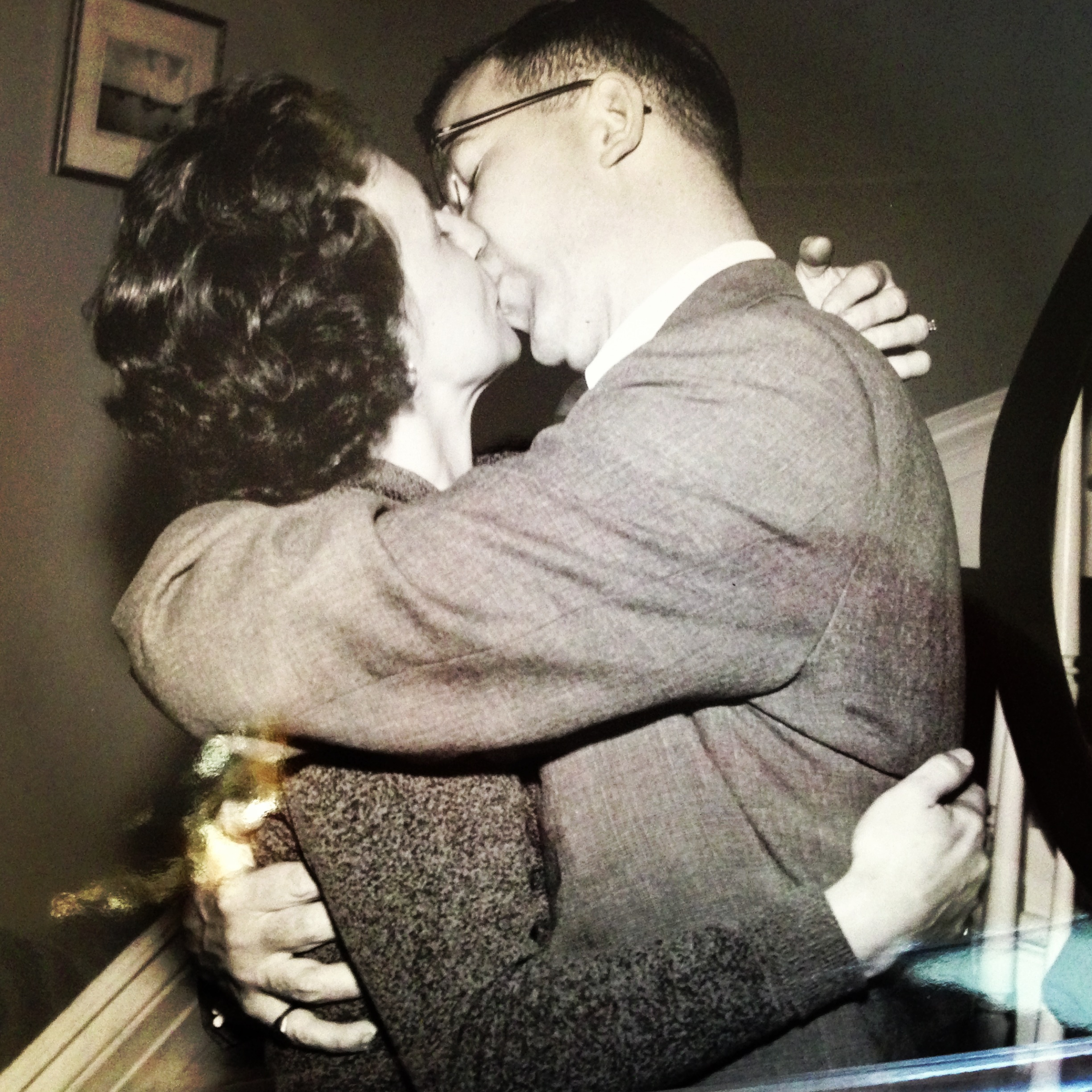
From the Teed Family Photo Album

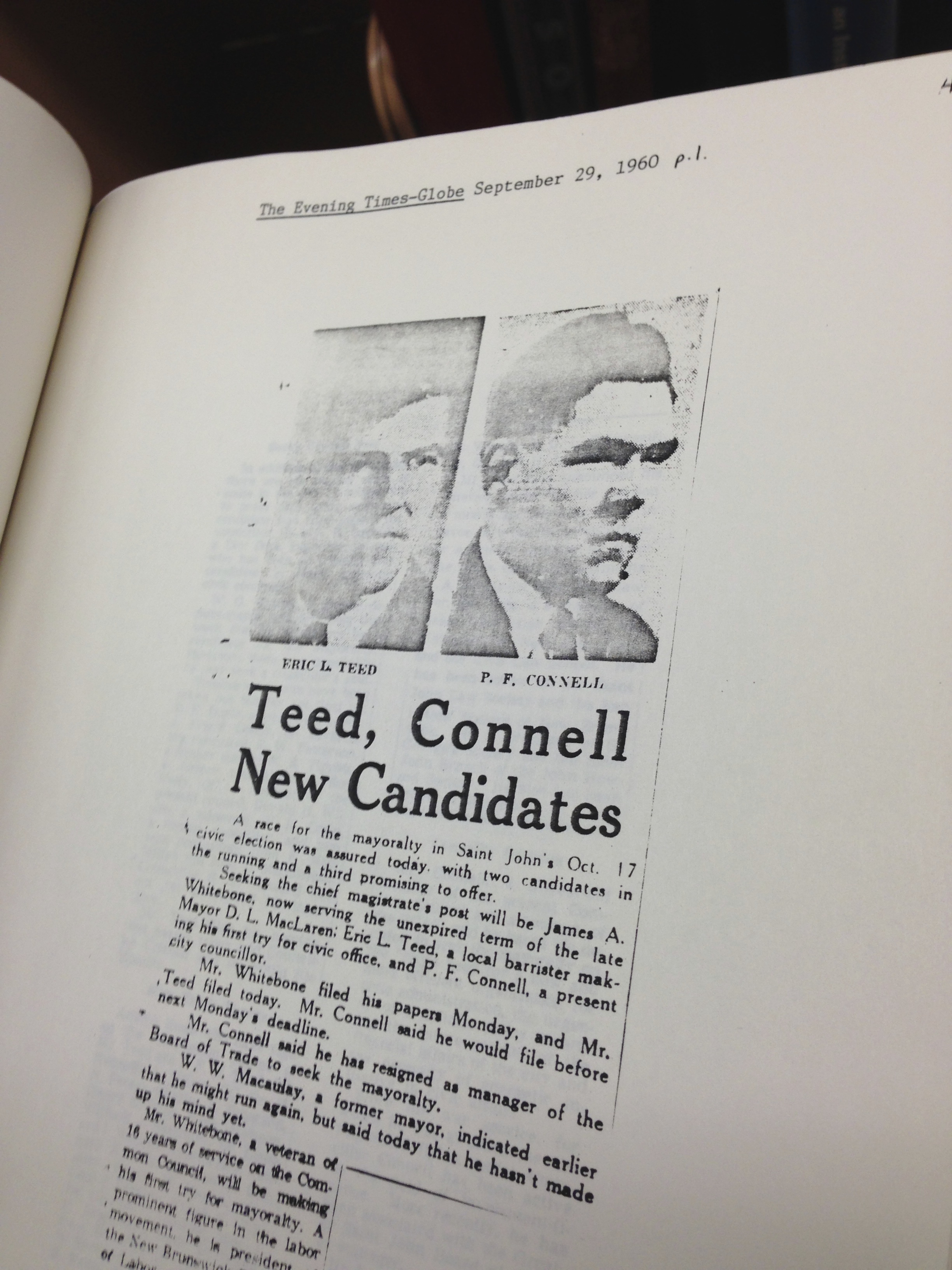
Eric Teed running for Office

== Sources ==
- "Canadian Who's Who".
- "Government House; Awards to Canadians" (PDF). Canada Gazette Part I. 139 (13). March 26, 2005. Archived from the original (PDF) on 2012-03-06.
