= Fernhill Cemetery =

Cemetery in Saint John, New Brunswick, Canada

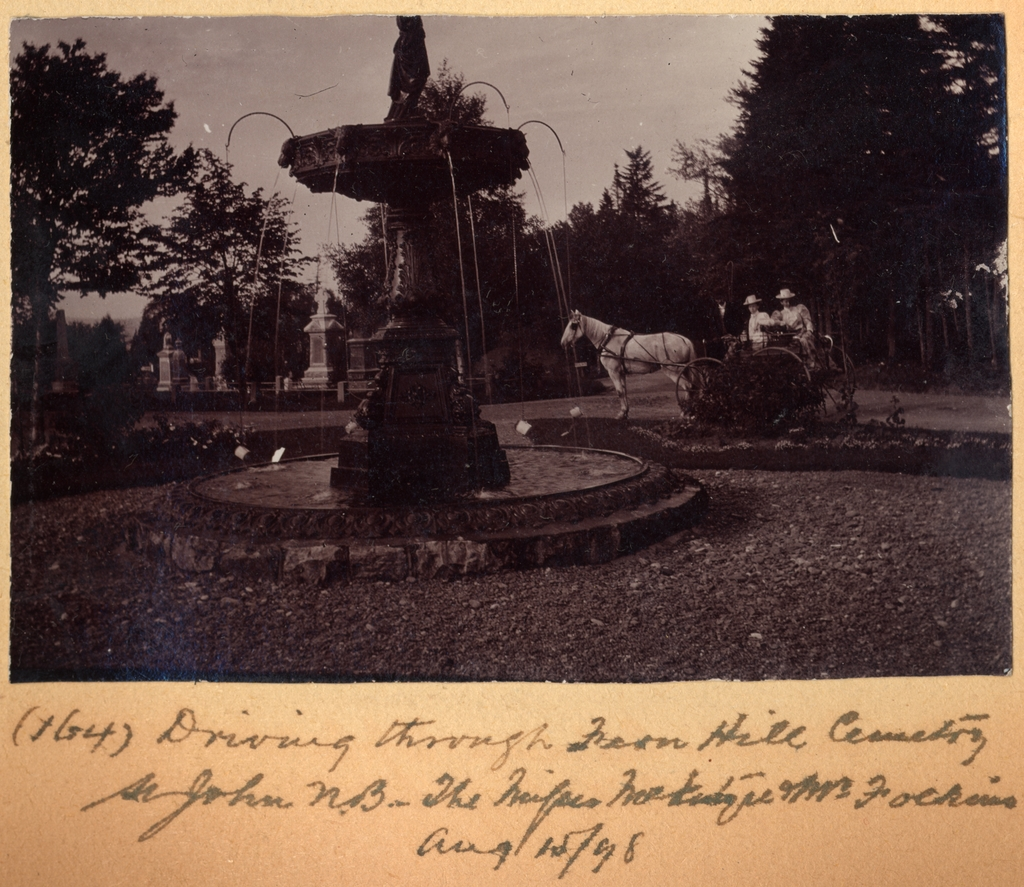
- Photograph of Fernhill Cemetery in 1898
- Interactive map of Fernhill Cemetery

Details
- Established: 1848
- Location: Saint John, New Brunswick
- Country: Canada
- Coordinates: 45.29435°N 66.03398°W
- Type: Public
- Owned by: Fernhill Cemetery Company (Not-for-profit corporation)
- Size: 125 acres (0.51 km^{2})
- No. of graves: 37,000+
- Website: Fernhill Cemetery Company
- Find a Grave: Fernhill Cemetery

Fernhill Cemetery, known as the Rural Cemetery when it opened in 1848, is located at 200 Westmorland Road in Saint John, New Brunswick, Canada. Renamed Fernhill in 1899, the 125 acre (0.5 km^{2}) cemetery has a special section for veterans of both World War I and World War II and is the burial site of one of only a few Canadians to ever receive the United States' highest military decoration, the Medal of Honor.

When the cemetery opened, the Church of England was the established church, and as such, there is a designated area for Church of England members. In the cemetery's Jewishsection, a stone chapel was built in 1950 with the help of the Hollywood mogul Louis B. Mayer, who grew up in Saint John and whose mother is interred here.

The cemetery contains the war graves of 103 Commonwealth service personnel, 67 of World War I and 36 of World War II.

Fernhill has operated a crematorium onsite since 1939, when it was the first crematorium east of Montreal.

== Notable persons interred ==
- Amos Edwin Botsford (1804–1894), statesman
- Ward Chipman (1754–1824), Attorney General of New Brunswick
- Robert Foulis (1796–1866), engineer and artist
- John Douglas Hazen (1860–1937), statesman, Premier of New Brunswick
- Anna Minerva Henderson (1887–1987), teacher, civil servant, and poet
- George E. King (1839–1901), statesman, Premier of New Brunswick, Supreme Court of Canada justice
- George Frederick Phillips (1862–1908) Spanish–American War hero, U.S. Medal of Honor
- William H. Steeves (1814–1873), a father of Confederation
- Sir Samuel Leonard Tilley (1818–1896), a father of Confederation
- W. Rupert Turnbull (1870–1954), aeronautical engineer, inventor
