= Warren Franklin Hatheway =

Canadian politician (1850–1923)

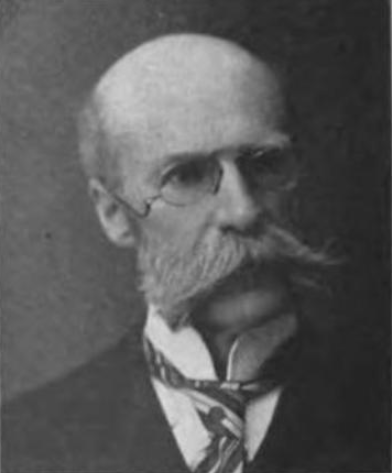

Member of the Legislative Assembly of New Brunswick
- In office 1908–1912
- Constituency: City of St. John

Personal details
- Born: September 16, 1850 Saint John, New Brunswick
- Died: October 29, 1923 (aged 73) Saint John, New Brunswick
- Resting place: Fernhill Cemetery
- Political party: Conservative
- Spouses: Elizabeth Elsom Green (m. 1880) Ella Bertha Marven (m. 1883)
- Children: 2
- Occupation: Businessman, writer, politician

Warren Franklin Hatheway (September 16, 1850 – October 29, 1923), also known as Frank Hatheway, was a businessman, author, social activist, and political figure in New Brunswick. He represented the City of St. John in the Legislative Assembly of New Brunswick from 1908 to 1912 as a Conservative member. He was a figure in the early Canadian labour movement and an advocate for workers' compensation legislation and social reform, being recognized as a socialist thinker despite his Conservative party affiliation.

== Biography ==
He was born in Saint John, New Brunswick, the son of Thomas Gilbert Hatheway and Harriet E. Bates. After the death of his father, he was forced to find work as a clerk for the Union Line steamer company. Hatheway then became bookkeeper for the firm owned by William Wallace Turnbull. He also wrote for local periodicals. In 1878, with a partner, he established his own grocery business. In 1880, he married Elizabeth Elsom Green. In 1883, he married Ella Bertha Marven. By 1887, he was in business on his own. He ran unsuccessfully for a seat in the provincial assembly in 1903. Hatheway died of a stroke in Saint John at the age of 73.

His grandfather Calvin Luther Hatheway, also an author, had written a history of New Brunswick. His cousin George Luther Hatheway had served as premier for the province.
