= W. F. Roberts =

Canadian politician

William F. Roberts

Member of the Legislative Assembly of New Brunswick Minister Without Portfolio (1917-1918) Minister of Health (1918-1925) Minister of Health and Labour (1935-1938)
- In office 1917-1925, and 1935–1938
- Constituency: Saint John

Personal details
- Born: 18 December 1869 Saint John, New Brunswick
- Died: 10 February 1938 (aged 68) Saint John, New Brunswick
- Party: New Brunswick Liberal Association
- Occupation: physician

William Francis Roberts (18 December 1869 – 10 February 1938) was a medical doctor, public health pioneer, women's voting rights advocate, and New Brunswick politician. Born and raised in Saint John, New Brunswick, he graduated from the University of New Brunswick and the Belleview Hospital Medical College in New York City and became an important advocate for public health.

Once appointed coroner for Saint John in 1902, he pushed for regulations and reforms that affected slaughterhouses, milk supply, sewage disposal, disease epidemics, and health education in schools. He was narrowly elected as a Liberal member of the Legislative Assembly of New Brunswick in 1917, and was at the centre of a battle over whether or not to create a ministry of health.

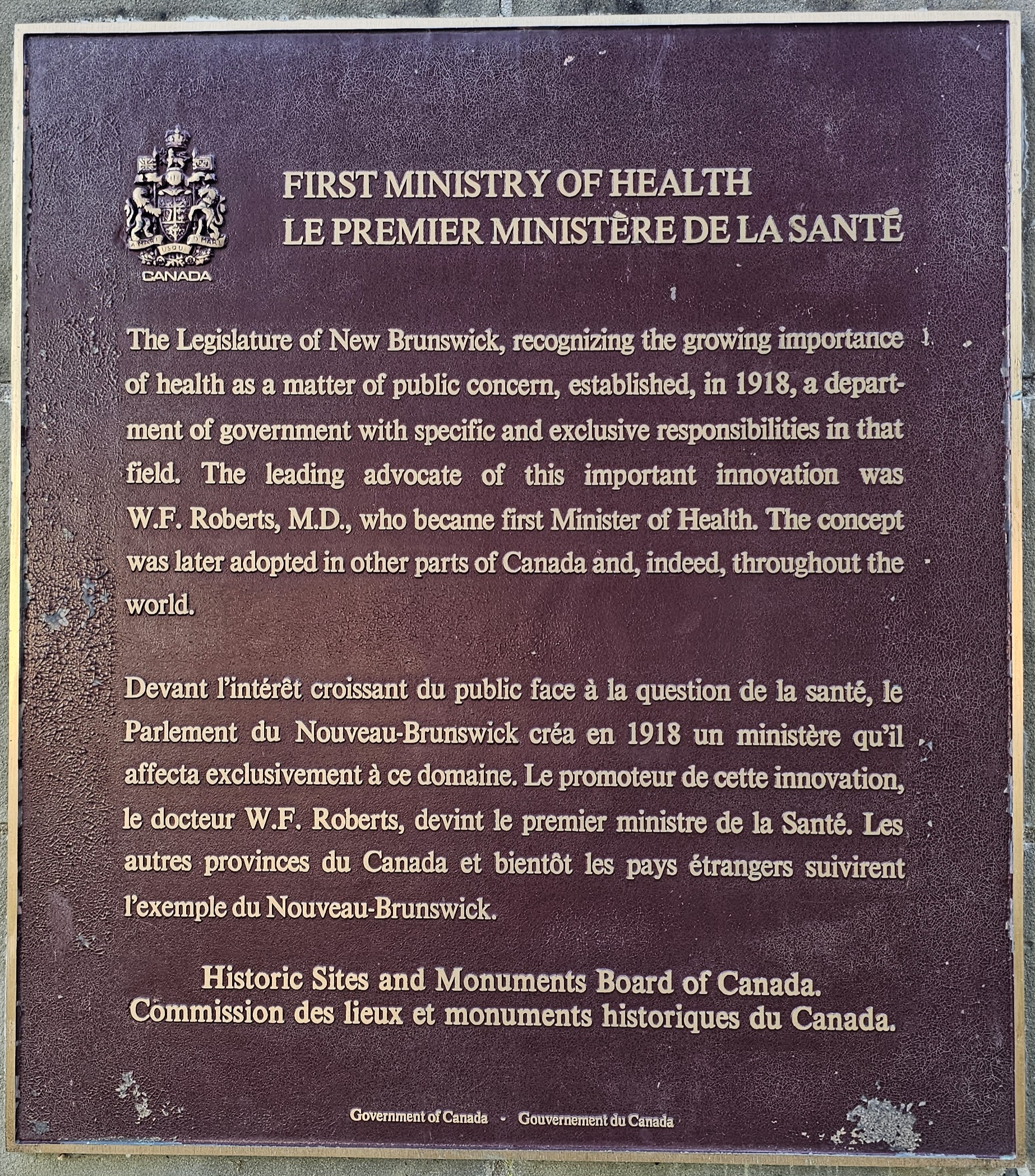
Plaque commemorating the creation of the Ministry of Health on the grounds of the New Brunswick Legislative Building in Fredericton

The legislation creating the Department of Health was passed in 1918 and Roberts was appointed the first Minister of Health in the British Empire. The influenza epidemic which followed shortly after the creation of the new department solidified its existence and was given credit by some for limiting the extent of the epidemic in New Brunswick. After being defeated in the 1925 provincial election, he once again served as an MLA for Saint John and as Minister of Health and Labour from 1935 until his death on 10 February 1938.
