= A. P. Paterson =

Canadian politician

Member of the Legislative Assembly of New Brunswick
- In office 1935–1939
- Constituency: Saint John Centre

Personal details
- Born: June 17, 1870 Shediac, New Brunswick
- Died: January 1, 1957 (aged 86) Saint John, New Brunswick
- Party: New Brunswick Liberal Association
- Spouse: E. Helen Pullen
- Children: 2
- Education: Mount Allison University
- Occupation: businessman

Alexander Pierce Paterson (June 17, 1870 – January 1, 1957) was a Canadian politician. He served in the Legislative Assembly of New Brunswick as member of the Liberal party from 1935 to 1939. He also briefly served as Minister of Education and Municipal and Federal Affairs.
