= Turnbull (surname) =

Turnbull is a northern English and Scottish surname. For theories of its etymology, see Clan Turnbull.

Notable people with the surname include:

- Agnes Sligh Turnbull (1888–1982), American writer
- Alan Turnbull (disambiguation)
- Albert Turnbull (1866–1929), New Zealand cricketer
- Alexander Turnbull (disambiguation)
- Alison Turnbull (born 1956), British painter and sculptor
- Andrew Turnbull (disambiguation)
- Ann Turnbull (born 1943), British writer of fiction for children and young adults
- Annie Turnbull (1898–2010), British supercentenarian
- Art Turnbull (born 1934), Australian rugby union wing
- Barbara Turnbull (1965–2015), Canadian quadriplegic news reporter and activist
- Barbara Turnbull (nurse) (fl. 2010s), New Zealand nurse
- Belle Turnbull (1881–1970), American poet
- Bernard Turnbull (1904–1984), Wales rugby union captain
- Bertrand Turnbull (1887–1943), Welsh field hockey player
- Bill Turnbull (1956–2022), British television presenter
- Blayre Turnbull (born 1993), Canadian ice hockey player
- Bob Turnbull (1894–1946), Scottish footballer
- Bobby Turnbull (1895–1952), English football outside right
- Campbell Turnbull (1898–1977), Australian politician
- Charles Turnbull (cricketer) (1851–1920), English cricketer
- Charles Wesley Turnbull (1935–2022), governor of the U.S. Virgin Islands
- Clive Turnbull (1906–1975), Australian author and journalist
- Colin Turnbull (1924–1994), anthropologist and author
- David Turnbull (disambiguation)
- Derek Turnbull (1926–2006), New Zealand long-distance runner
- Derek Turnbull (rugby union) (born 1961), Scottish rugby union player
- Don Turnbull (disambiguation)
- Dorotea Turnbull (1929–2016), Argentine Olympic swimmer
- Doug Turnbull (1903–1993), American lacrosse player
- Sir Douglass Turnbull, Professor of Neurology at the Newcastle University
- Drew Turnbull, Andrew "Drew" Turnbull (c. 1930 – 2012), Scottish rugby league footballer of the 1950s for Leeds and Great Britain
- Eddie Turnbull (1923–2011), Scottish football player and manager
- Elizabeth Turnbull (1885–1988), New Zealand woollen mill worker
- Frank Turnbull (born 1954), Canadian ice hockey goaltender
- Franklin White Turnbull (1881–1971), member of the House of Commons of Canada (1930–1935)
- Fred Turnbull (disambiguation)
- Gael Turnbull (1924–2004), Scottish poet who was an important precursor of the British Poetry Revival
- Gareth Turnbull (born 1979), Irish middle-distance runner
- George Turnbull (disambiguation)
- Gordon Turnbull, British psychiatrist
- Grace Turnbull (1880–1976), American painter, sculptor and writer
- H. Rutherford Turnbull (born 1937), American author and educator
- Hector Turnbull (businessman) (1733–1788), Perthshire, Scotland
- Hector Turnbull (1884–1934), American screenwriter and film producer
- Herbert Turnbull (1885–1961), English mathematician
- Hilda Turnbull (born 1942), Australian politician, member of the West Australian Legislative Assembly (1989–2001)
- Hubert Maitland Turnbull (1875–1955), British pathologist
- Ian Turnbull (disambiguation)
- Jack Turnbull (footballer) (1885–1917), Australian rules footballer
- Jack Turnbull (lacrosse) (1910–1944), American lacrosse player
- James Turnbull (politician), (died 1846), Nova Scotia lawyer and politician
- James Turnbull (steamboat captain), first to ascend the Colorado River by steamboat in November 1852.
- James Youll Turnbull (1883–1916), Scottish recipient of the Victoria Cross in World War I
- Jay Turnbull (1911 – 1992), Scottish footballer
- Jessica Turnbull (born 1995), Australian squash player
- Jessie Turnbull (1845–1920), Canadian women's rights activist
- Jimmy Turnbull (1884 – not earlier than 1913), Scottish footballer
- John Turnbull (disambiguation)
- Jonathan Turnbull (born 1962), English cricketer
- Jordan Turnbull (born 1994), English football central defender
- Joseph Turnbull (c. 1725 – 1775), English musician, player of the Northumbrian smallpipes
- Josh Turnbull (born 1988), Wales international rugby union player
- Keith Turnbull (1907–1978), Australian politician, member of the Victorian Legislative Assembly (1950–1964)
- Ken Turnbull (c. 1921 – 2008), Canadian football player
- Koi Turnbull (born 1976), comics artist
- Lee Turnbull (disambiguation)
- Lindsay Turnbull (1930–2023), Australian rules footballer
- Lucinha Turnbull (born 1953), Brazilian musician
- Lucy Turnbull (born 1958), former Lord Mayor of Sydney and wife of businessman and fellow politician, Malcolm Turnbull
- Malcolm Turnbull (born 1954), Australian politician; 29th Prime Minister of Australia
- Margaret Turnbull, American astronomer who developed a catalog of potentially habitable solar systems
- Margaret Turnbull (screenwriter) (1872–1942), Scottish playwright and screenwriter
- Marjorie Turnbull (born 1940), member of the Florida House of Representatives
- Mark Turnbull (born 1973), Australian sailor and 2000 Olympic champion
- Mary Turnbull (Constance Mary Turnbull', C. M. Turnbull; 1927–2008), British historian
- Maurice Turnbull (1905–1944), Welsh cricketer, rugby union player, and soldier
- Michael Turnbull (disambiguation)
- Murray Turnbull (1919–2014), American artist and art educator
- Nick Turnbull (born 1981), American football safety
- Noel Turnbull (1890–1970), British tennis player
- Norm Turnbull (1894–1977), Australian rules footballer
- Norman Turnbull (songwriter) (1879–1954), British songwriter
- Norman Turnbull (1900–1986), Canadian politician
- Olaf Turnbull (1917–2004), Canadian farmer, educator and politician
- Olga and Betty Turnbull, English child entertainers in the 1930s
- Oliver Turnbull (1919–2009), Scotland rugby union player
- Paul Turnbull (born 1989), English football midfielder
- Paula Mary Turnbull (1921–2018), American welding nun
- Percival Turnbull (1862–1937), New Zealand cricketer
- Percy Turnbull (1902–1976), English composer and pianist
- Perry Turnbull (born 1959), retired National Hockey League player
- Peter Turnbull (disambiguation)
- Phil Turnbull (born 1987), English footballer
- Philip Turnbull (1879–1930), Welsh field hockey player
- Phipps Turnbull, Scottish rugby union player
- Randy Turnbull (born 1962), Canadian ice hockey defenceman
- Ray Turnbull (disambiguation)
- Reg Turnbull, (1908–2006), Australian politician
- Renaldo Turnbull (born 1966), American football linebacker
- Richard Turnbull (colonial administrator) (1909–1998), last governor of the British mandate of Tanganyika (1958–1961)
- Richard Turnbull (theologian) (1960–2025), English principal of Wycliffe Hall, Oxford
- Rivers Turnbull (1855–1927), English cricketer
- Robert Turnbull (disambiguation)
- Roland Evelyn Turnbull (1905–1960), British colonial administrator and Governor of North Borneo
- Ronnie Turnbull (1922–1966), English football centre forward
- Ross Turnbull (rugby union) (1941–2015), Australian rugby union player
- Ross Turnbull (born 1985), English footballer
- Roz Turnbull (born 1972), New Zealand actress
- Ryan Turnbull (born 1971), former Australian rules footballer
- Sandy Turnbull, Scottish football player who died in World War I
- Sara Little Turnbull (1917–2015), American product designer
- Scott Turnbull (born 1981), English actor.
- Simon Turnbull (1950–2014), Australian entrepreneur and self-proclaimed psychic
- Spencer Turnbull (born 1992), American baseball pitcher
- Stephen Turnbull (disambiguation)
- Steven Turnbull (rugby union) (born 1987), Scottish rugby union player
- Stuart Turnbull (born 1947), American economist
- Stuart Turnbull (basketball) (born 1984), Canadian basketball player
- Susan Turnbull, American Democratic organiser
- Thomas Turnbull (architect) (1824–1907), New Zealand architect
- Thomas Scott Turnbull (1825–1880), Mayor of Sunderland, founder of a daily provincial newspaper, Sunderland Echo
- Tommy Turnbull, fictional character in Robotboy
- Travis Turnbull (born 1986), American-German ice hockey player
- Wallace Rupert Turnbull (1879–1954), Canadian inventor
- Walter Turnbull (1944–2007), American musician
- Wendy Turnbull (born 1952), Australian tennis player
- William Turnbull (disambiguation)
- Winton Turnbull (1899–1980), Australian politician.

Given name

- John Turnbull Thomson (1821–1884), British-born civil engineer

== See also ==
- Trumbull (disambiguation)
- Clan Turnbull
- Turnbull (disambiguation)
