= Morillot =

Morillot (pronounced [mɔʁijo]) is a surname. Notable people with the surname include:

- Juliette Morillot (born 1959), French journalist
- Roland Morillot (1885–1915), French naval officer
  - French ship Roland Morillot
