= Clan Turnbull =

Scottish clan

Coat of arms of the Turnbull of Bedrule, the last chief of clan Turnbull

Clan Turnbull is an armigerous Scottish clan.

== Origins of the name ==
A legendary account of the Turnbull name was told by Hector Boece, in his History of Scotland. Boece tells the legend that during the Wars of Scottish Independence William of Rule saved King Robert Bruce by wrestling to the ground a bull that had charged at the King. For this feat, the King rewarded William with the lands of Philiphaugh, now part of Selkirk, and dubbed him "Turnebull" (the "e" was later dropped).

The story of the young man who saved the life of Robert the Bruce, called Will-o-Rull is well known; also how Robert the Bruce changed his name to Turn-E-Bull. This later evolved to the name "Turnbull".

The name of Rule is of quite ancient origin in the border counties of Scotland and in the north of England. It first appears in the fourth century when St. Regulus or St. Rule arrived on the shores of Scotland at what is now St. Andrews in Fife.

Another possibility that the family may have descended from Richard De Rollo, also known as Richard De Rule, claimed to have come to the British Isles about the time of William the Conqueror and descended from Rollo of Norway, Duke of Normandy (860–932).

He was given extensive grants of lands and property in Scotland and England. Still, the first authentic records of the name appear about 1128 when persons named Adam Roule, Richard Roule, Hugo Roule, William Roule and John Roule are noted in the Scottish Borders in the county of Roxburgh.

There is an area in the south central part of Roxburghshire that is known as the Valley of the Rule. This valley contains a small river called Rule Water, and there are several little communities along its course that bear, in part, the name of Rule, such as Bedrule, Abbotsrule, Hallrule, Town of Rule, and more.

Also from this valley comes the branch of the Rule Family whose name is now Turnbull. As the story is told, about 1315 in Selkirkshire, a giant named William Rule was on a hunting trip with King Robert the Bruce, when the king was attacked by a wild bison or bull. Grabbing it by the horns, Rule turned its head to one side and killed it. He was given the name of "Turn-E-Bull" by King Robert and from him has descended a quite extensive family. This story is referred to in the register of the great seal of Scotland. John Leyden describes the incident as follows: "On Scotia's lord he rushed, with lightning speed, / Bent his strong neck, to toss the startled steed; / His arms robust the hardy hunter flung / Around his bending horns, and upward wrung, / With writhing force his neck retorted round, / And rolled the panting monster on the ground, / Crushed, with enormous strength, his bony skull: / And courtiers hailed the man, who turned the bull."

Another possibility, Is, that Turnbull is derived from the Old English Trumbald or French Tumbald (meaning "strong and bold"), or that Robertus de Turnbulyes, who swore fealty to King Edward I of England in 1296, could be the family father.

Despite the dispute over the origin of the Turnbull name, historians agree that:

- Robert the Bruce awarded lands in Philiphaugh to William Turnebull.
- William Turnebull assumed a bull's head as his heraldic symbol with the motto, "I Saved The King" – both of which have been incorporated into the Turnbull clan crest.
- The name Turnebull was not recorded before 1315, when William was awarded the lands in Philiphaugh – and following this time, use of the Rule surname dwindled while use of the Turnebull surname increased.

The Turnbulls were to become one of the most turbulent of the Borders families. A Scottish nobleman, sent to see if the Turnbulls would back their claim to the throne, reported back that they had no care at all for politicians but always yearned for a fight.

Before the Battle of Halidon Hill in 1333, a champion on the Scottish side, a huge man named Turnbull, accompanied by a huge black mastiff, approached the English host and challenged anyone to single combat. Sir Robert Benhale, a Norfolk knight, answered the challenge and killed both Turnbull and his dog. Benhale returned to the English host, bearing Turnbull's head as a trophy.

Major Gordon Turnbull led the vicious counterattack on the French Cavalry by the 2nd Scots Greys at Waterloo. Though outnumbered some 2-1, the Scots broke Napoleon's famed cavalry, and the Greys destroyed most of Napoleon's legendary Nogue's brigade, resulting in the capture of the eagle of the 45th Ligne. According to Wellington, they "had little tactical ability or nous"[common sense], "but fought like raging bulls". This was taken as a compliment by their Turnbull leader, whose son, brother and three cousins rode into battle: five were wounded and one died. James Hamilton, overall commander of the Greys and the other Scottish cavalry regiment (who were supposed to form a reserve), ordered a continuation of the charge to the French Grande Batterie. Though the Greys had neither the time nor means to disable the cannon or carry them off, they put a number of them out of action as the gun crews fled the battlefield. Some historians note that this action had a direct outcome on the battle itself.

James Youll Turnbull VC.

Two Turnbulls were Scottish recipients of the Victoria Cross, the highest and most prestigious award for gallantry in the face of the enemy that can be awarded to British and Commonwealth forces. The most famous being James Youll Turnbull, who single-handedly held a position for 24 hours, against almost a full regiment of Germans, with a machine gun in World War I. Each time the British tried to send reinforcements, they were wiped out due to the open ground exposing them to deadly crossfire. The ground was held by Turnbull singlehandedly, and this story became renowned for the British people in the dark days of the war. He died the next day while leading a Brigade of Highlanders on a grenade attack, which eventually turned the tide of the deadly stalemate where some 50,000 soldiers on both sides became casualties. Winston Churchill himself wrote on this defense in his book stating: On 1 July 1916 at Leipzig Salient, Authuille, France, Sergeant Turnbull's party captured a post of apparent importance to the enemy who immediately began heavy counter-attacks, which were continued throughout the day. Although his party was wiped out and replaced several times, Sergeant Turnbull never wavered in his determination to hold the post, the loss of which would have been serious. Almost single-handed he maintained his position, displaying the highest degree of valour and skill in the performance of his duty. Later in the day, he was killed while engaged in a bombing counter-attack. The Germans were said, after seeing the body of Turnbull in his uniform kilt, to call him and all Scots "The Devils in Dress" and "Ladies from Hell!"

The Turnbulls held land throughout the Borders. They were the only clan to have a bounty placed on them by the King. William Turnbull received a charter from Robert the Bruce in 1315 to land near Philiphaugh, and John Turnbull received the lands of Hundleshope from King David II of Scotland.

== 15th to 18th centuries ==
John Turnbull, nicknamed "Outwith sword", for his fierce temper, is listed as a Scots prisoner of war in England around 1400. William Turnbull held a papal appointment in 1433 and this same name appears as one of the canons of Glasgow Cathedral in 1452. Stephen Tournebulle represented Scottish interests at the University of Orleans at the beginning of the sixteenth century. William Turnbull, Bishop of Glasgow, procured from the Pope a charter to establish a university in Glasgow in 1450. The Bishop's vision was realised when the University of Glasgow was founded in 1451.

Many Turnbull families moved into the Cheviot Hills and into the northern lands of Northumberland depending on the politics of the day and the King of the day. Those who became "English" also changed from their Presbyterian roots to being Church of England. For example, John Turnbull was born at Roddam in 1789 in the Anglican Parish of Ilderton, but was baptised in the nearby Presbyterian Church at Branton. There were a number of small Presbyterian Churches dotted around Northumberland as several Scottish families crossed the border to live. He, along with others, eventually attended Anglican churches. John Turnbull's latter children were baptised in Anglican churches. This John Turnbull went on to being the Land Agent for the Earl of Liverpool in the little Shropshire settlement of Pitchford from the 1820s to the 1850s.

== New World ==
Turnbull family were the last of the "First Family" during the Siege of Petersburg, and was the residence of Robert E. Lee for the last 13 weeks of the war. For their loyalty during the tough times, Lee's family bible was given to Mrs. Turnbull who had three sons, one killed and two wounded in Lee's army of Northern Virginia. 17 Turnbulls fought for the Confederacy during the Civil War with five dying in combat (two of which in Picket's charge where family lore claims it was a Turnbull who jumped over the wall first, Jacob Turnbull 1st Sergeant for the 2nd Va was reported to be the highest-ranking NCO to lead Regiment over the wall after all officers were either killed or wounded), seven dying of disease and five of combat wounds. Lee's Family bible was returned by Scott V. Turnbull to R.E. Lee's son at Lee's funeral in 1870 per the Richmond Papers.

== French branch ==
William Turnbull was born in Scotland and was an archer in the Garde Ecossaise created by Charles VII of France. In 1474, William was naturalized French with a royal letter of naturalization. At this moment, William Turnbull became "Guillaume de Tournebulle" and the founder of a French noble family established in the province of Champagne, where his descendants were lords of Saint-Lumier-la-Populeuse and lords of Heiltz-le-Maurupt. The Tournebulle coat of arms was the same than the Turnbull of Bedrule family, in French "d'argent à trois têtes de bœufs de sable".

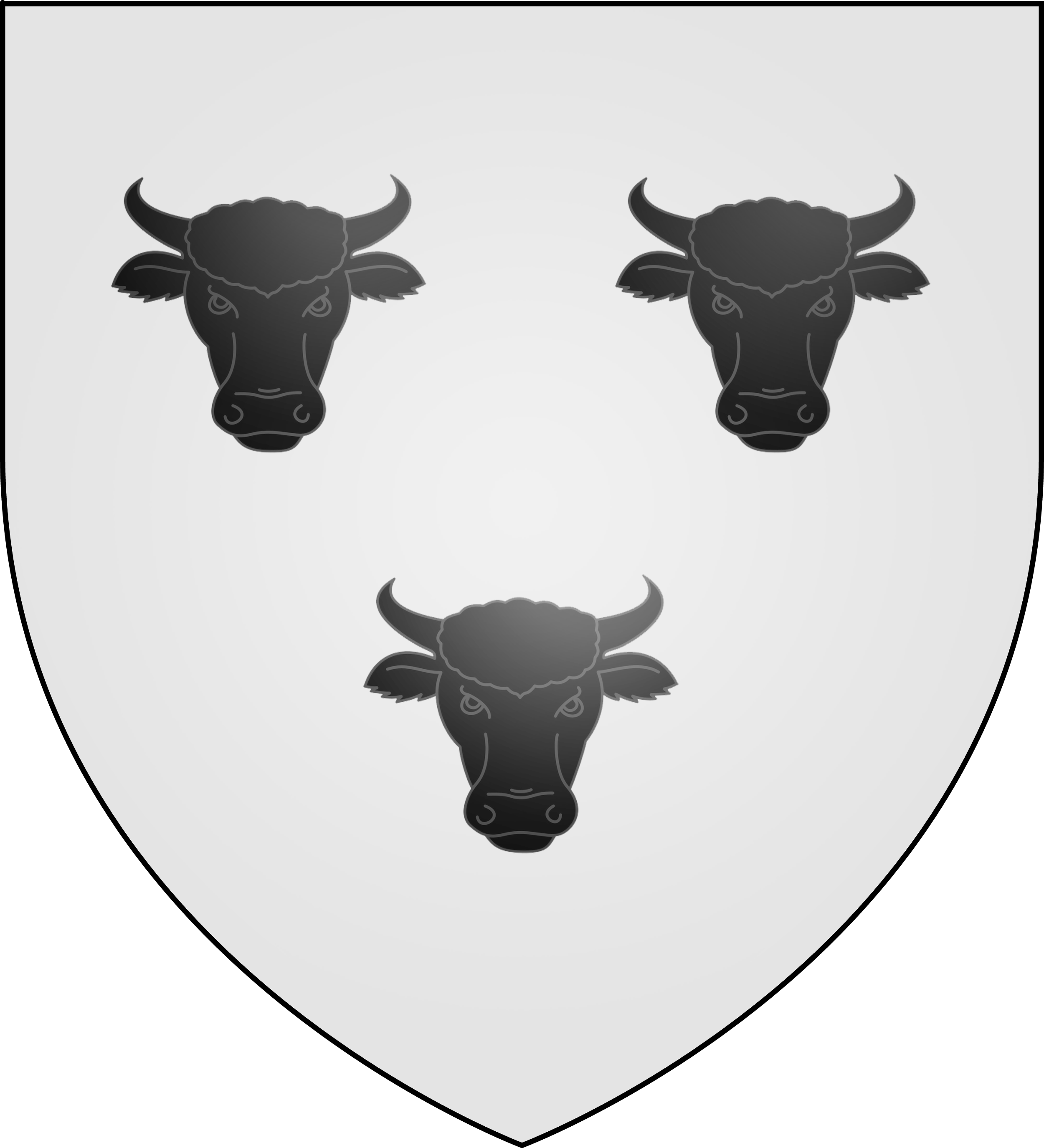
Famille de Tournebulle

== Other notable members ==
- Bill Turnbull, (journalist), born in Surrey, England. Died 2022. Worked on UK breakfast TV and later for a radio station, Classic FM.
- Herbert Turnbull, who died in 1961, was a distinguished mathematician responsible for major contributions to the study of algebra.
- George Turnbull, born near Perth in Scotland, was dubbed "The first railway engineer of India", having been the Chief Engineer building some 500 miles of the first railway in the 1850s from Calcutta towards Delhi.
- Jonathan Trumbull Governor of Connecticut; his sons Joseph Trumbull, Jonathan Trumbull, Jr., and John Trumbull the painter; and the related poet John Trumbull
- Robert Blair Mayne (11 January 1915 – 14 December 1955), nicknamed Paddy, father's mother was Maj. Gordon Turnbull's great-great-great-granddaughter
- Malcolm Turnbull, Australian politician and 29th Prime Minister of Australia
- Constance Mary Turnbull (1927–2008), Professor Emeritus, author of the definitive 'History of Singapore', and firstwoman recruited to the Malayan Civil Service
- Ray Turnbull (Curler), born in Huntsville, Canada. Died 2017. Two time Canadian Champion curler, once world finalist, world renowned curling coach, and the voice of curling in Canada on The Sports Network (TSN) for over 25 years.
- Neil Turnbull, (Scotch Whisky broker), of Chappell Whisky Brokers. Purveyor of fine spirits.
- Isabella Turnbull, living legend.

== Castles ==
- Fatlips Castle
- Barnhills Tower
- Bedrule Castle
- Fulton Tower

== See also ==
- Scottish clan
- Armigerous clan
