= Trumbull =

Trumbull may refer to:

== Places ==
=== United States ===
- Trumbull County, Ohio
  - Trumbull Township, Ashtabula County, Ohio
- Trumbull, Connecticut
- Trumbull, Nebraska
- Fort Trumbull, Connecticut
- Mount Trumbull Wilderness in Arizona

== People ==
=== Surname ===
- Donald Trumbull (1909–2004), American motion picture special effects artist
- Douglas Trumbull (1942–2022), American film director
- Ed Trumbull (1860–1937), American baseball player
- Henry Clay Trumbull (1830–1903), American clergyman and author
- James Hammond Trumbull (1821–1897), American philologist
- J. Gunnar Trumbull, American economist
- John Trumbull (1756–1843), American painter
- John Trumbull (poet) (1750–1831), American poet
- John H. Trumbull (1873–1961), Governor of Connecticut
- Jonathan Trumbull (1710–1785), Governor of both the Colony and State of Connecticut
- Jonathan Trumbull Jr. (1740–1809), second Speaker of the U.S. House of Representatives, and Governor of Connecticut
- Joseph Trumbull (commissary general) (1737–1778), of the Continental Army during the American Revolutionary War
- Joseph Trumbull (governor) (1782-1861), American lawyer and Governor of Connecticut
- Lyman Trumbull (1813–1896), American jurist and politician
- Millie Reid Trumbull (1866–1940), American social reformer
- Pennie Lane Trumbull (born 1954), American philanthropist and entrepreneur
- Stephen Trumbull (1898–1970), American reporter
- William Trumbull (diplomat) (c. 1575–1635), English diplomat, administrator and politician
- William Trumbull (1639–1716), English statesman

=== Given name ===
- Trumbull Cary (1787–1869), American banker, lawyer and politician
- Trumbull Stickney (1874–1904), American classical scholar and poet

=== Fictional characters ===
- Thomas Trumbull, a member of the Black Widowers, a fictional men-only dining club created by Isaac Asimov
- Allan Trumbull, president of United States of Has Fallen series

== Other uses ==
- Trumbull College, a residential college of Yale University

== See also ==
- Turnbull (surname)
