= Trimble (surname) =

- Pronunciation: trim' bl

Origin
- Origin: English
- Region of origin: England or Scotland

Other names
- Variant forms: Tribble, Turnbull, Trumble

Trimble is a surname of English or Scottish origin. The surname was introduced to Ireland (predominantly Ulster counties Fermanagh, Tyrone and Down) during the 17th century as a consequence of the Plantation of Ulster.

== Origins ==
There is no consensus regarding the origins of the name Trimble. It has been speculated that Trimble is a corruption of the Cumberland and Scottish Borders surname Turnbull. If this is the case, the origins of the family would be in Roxburghshire, specifically the areas around the Rule Water and Bedrule. Here the Turnbull family became established as a prominent borders family by the late 13th century with their main seat at Bedrule Castle.

A popular myth states that the Turnbull name was first given to a man named Rule who is said to have saved King Robert the Bruce from a charging bull by 'turning' the bull's head. In response to this heroic act, the King then rewarded Rule with the lands around Bedrule and instructed him to change his name to 'Turnbull'. Whilst the Turnbulls may indeed have originated in Bedrule, unfortunately, this highly romantic bull-baiting myth, first advanced by Hector Boece, is thought to have no true historical basis. Rather, it is more likely that the Turnbull's of Bedrule, derived their name from the Old English word 'Trumbald', meaning 'strongly bold'.

An alternate branch of the family from that found in Bedrule may have its origins in Fife. In 1281, Robert de Tremblay was granted a charter of land in Fife by Sir Alexander de Moray and these lands later became known as Tremblayslands, whilst in 1263, Walter de Trembley occupied the lands of Delany in the Mearns. Black speculates that recorded surnames such as Trimbill, Trombill and Trumble, found in Fife, may have derived from either of these two individuals, whilst the Old English surname Turnbull derives from Bedrule. Barrow has argued that there is no evidence to confirm Black's distinction, however, and that both Turnbull, as well as Tremble, Trimble and Trumble etc., all most likely derive from the Norman name de Tremblay. For evidence of this, he argues that as the name Walter was in later times a Turnbull personal name, it is significant that the first de Tremblay in Scottish records was also named Walter.

It has also been argued elsewhere that the origins of the name are Anglo-French and topographical. If this were the case, the name would derive from the Latin word 'tremulare', meaning 'tremble', once used to describe the movement of aspen trees. The surname would therefore have described someone who lived near such trees. This would link the surname Trimble with names with such spellings as Tremoille, Tremouille, Tremblet, Trembley, and Tremblot.

In the United States, it can also be an americanized form of the French surname Tremblay.

== Notable people ==
Notable people with the name include:

- Allen Trimble, Governor of Ohio, 1822 & 1826–1830
- Angela Trimble, birthname of the singer Debbie Harry
- Andrew Trimble, Irish rugby footballer
- Barbara Margaret Trimble, British crime/thriller writer
- Bjo Trimble, science fiction writer
- Bobb Trimble, folk musician
- Carey A. Trimble, Hawaii politician
- David Trimble (1944–2022), Northern Irish politician, Conservative Party
- David Trimble (congressman)
- Deja Trimble, American rapper, singer and songwriter
- Frederick H. Trimble, American architect
- Gail Trimble, captain of the 2009 University Challenge champions from Corpus Christi College, Oxford
- Glenn Trimble, Australian cricketer
- Gordon Trimble, American politician
- Isaac Ridgeway Trimble, Confederate General in the Civil War
- James Trimble (disambiguation):
  - James William Trimble, U.S. Representative from Arkansas
  - James W. Trimble (football coach), American college football coach
  - James Trimble (Canadian politician), Speaker of the British Columbia legislature
- Jerry Trimble, American actor and martial artist
- Jim Trimble, American football coach
- Joan Trimble (1915–2000), Irish composer and pianist
- Joe Trimble, baseball pitcher
- John Trimble (theologian), cofounder of the Grange farmers movement in the USA
- John Trimble (politician), U.S. Representative from Tennessee
- Kenny Trimble, American musician
- King M. Trimble (1943–1998), American politician
- Laurence Trimble, silent movie star, writer, and director
- Lawrence S. Trimble (1825–1904), U.S. Representative from Kentucky
- Lester Trimble, American music critic and composer
- Reed Trimble (born 2000), American baseball player
