= Tribble (disambiguation) =

Tribble or tribbles may refer to:

== Entertainment ==
- A tribble, a fictional creature in the Star Trek universe
  - One of the Star Trek episodes involving tribbles:
    - "The Trouble with Tribbles", 1967, their first appearance, in Star Trek: The Original Series
    - "More Tribbles, More Troubles", 1973, in Star Trek: The Animated Series
    - "Trials and Tribble-ations", 1996, in Star Trek: Deep Space Nine
    - “The Breach”, 2003, in “Star Trek: Enterprise”
  - Tribbles (game), a 2000 card game based on the Star Trek creature

== Science and technology ==
- Tribble, a group of 12-bits (in early computing)
- Tribbles homolog 2, a protein kinase (type of enzyme) encoded in humans by the TRIB2 gene.
- Tribbles homolog 3, a putative protein kinase encoded in humans by the TRIB3 gene.
- A horizontal frame with wires stretched across it for drying paper. (see Wiktionary))

== People ==
- Tribble (surname)
- Tribble Reese, (born 1985), an American television personality, model, bartender and ex-college athlete
- Nancy Tribble Benda (1930-2015), an actress, educator, and a pioneer of educational television

== Other uses ==
- Tribble, West Virginia, an unincorporated community in Mason County
- Dr. Albert H. Tribble House, a historic house in Hot Springs, Arkansas
- Fraserwood/Tribble Ranch Field Aerodrome, an aerodrome 4.9 miles from Fraserwood, Manitoba, Canada

== See also ==
- Trible (surname)
- Tribles Store, another name for Hazel Green, Kentucky
