= Octave Morillot =

Joseph Ange Léon Octave Morillot (French: [ɔktav mɔʁijo]; 29 August 1878 — 27 April 1931) was a French painter who worked in French Polynesia for much of his life. He was the brother of French naval hero Roland Morillot.

== Biography ==
Morillot was born at the Château de Bussemont in Saint-Lumier-la-Populeuse. Son of the deputy Léon Morillot, he became a naval officer, and was assigned in 1901 to the Pacific station on the Durance and became friends there with Victor Segalen and Claude Farrère. Noticing his skill in drawing, Segalen and Farrère encouraged him to take up painting.

Paying little attention to his profession, asking for leave after leave, he ended up resigning in 1906 and settling in Taha'a in the Leeward Islands. Living in poverty and taking drugs, he did not stop painting. The inheritance from his father's death then allowed him to acquire a plantation in Tahaa.

He then lived in Raiatea where he shared his life between hunting, painting and women. In 1914, he re-enlisted to participate in the defense of Tahiti against the Germans and played an active role.

In February–March 1922, the Galerie Barbazanges in Paris organized a retrospective exhibition.

In 1929 he was made a knight of the Legion of Honour.

He died in Raiatea from opium abuse.

== Works ==
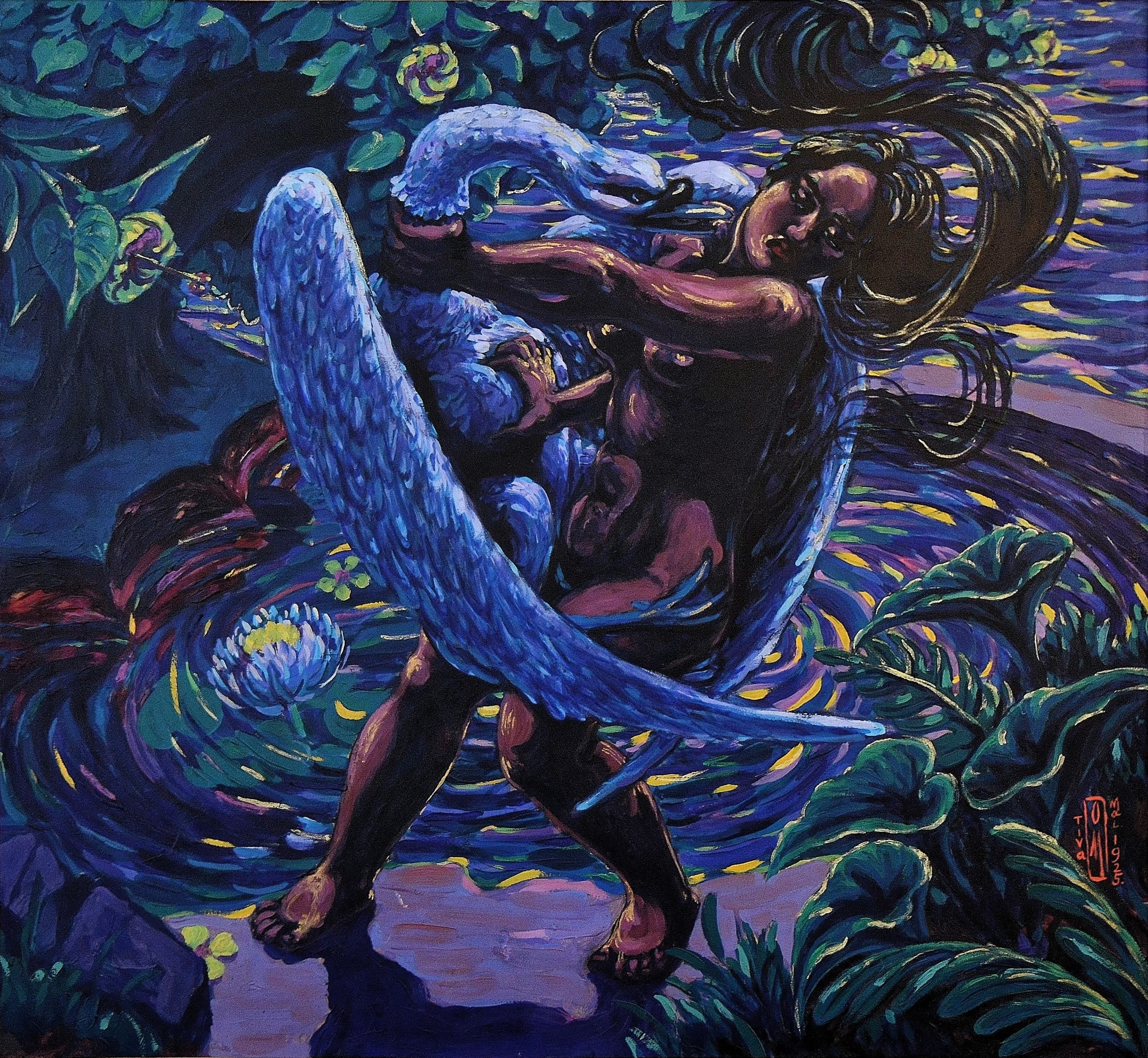
Leda and the Swan, oil on canvas, May 1925, Chartres Museum of Fine Arts

Totally self-taught but influenced by the colors of Paul Gauguin, we owe him numerous stylized exotic landscapes and sensual vahinés. In 1922 and 1928, two exhibitions of his works in Paris did not achieve the expected success despite the support of his friends Farrère and Pierre Benoit.

His Léda et le cygne is held at the Museum of Fine Art in Chartres. His Femmes de Tahiti is held at the Musée d'Orsay.
