= Turnbull =

Turnbull may refer to:

== People ==
- See Turnbull (surname)
- Malcolm Turnbull, former Prime Minister of Australia

== Places ==
- Turnbull Canyon in Los Angeles County, California, USA
- Turnbull High School in Bishopbriggs, Scotland
- Turnbull National Wildlife Refuge, located near Spokane, Washington, USA
- Turnbull railway station in Manitoba, Canada
- Turnbull River, a river located on the West Coast of New Zealand's South Island
- Turnbull School
- Turnbull Stakes
- Turnbull Thomson Park, Invercargill, NZ
- Mount Turnbull, Antarctica (named after W.L. Turnbull, radio supervisor at Mawson Station in 1965)
- Mount Turnbull, Arizona, USA
- Mount Turnbull, British Columbia (Sonora Island), Canada

== Other ==
- Clan Turnbull, Scottish clan
- Jack Turnbull Award, award given yearly to the top attackman in NCAA lacrosse
