= Balinese saka calendar =

Calendar used on the Indonesian island of Bali

The Balinese saka calendar is one of two calendars used on the Indonesian island of Bali. Unlike the 210-day pawukon calendar, it is based on the phases of the Moon, and is approximately the same length as the tropical year (solar year, Gregorian year).

== Months ==
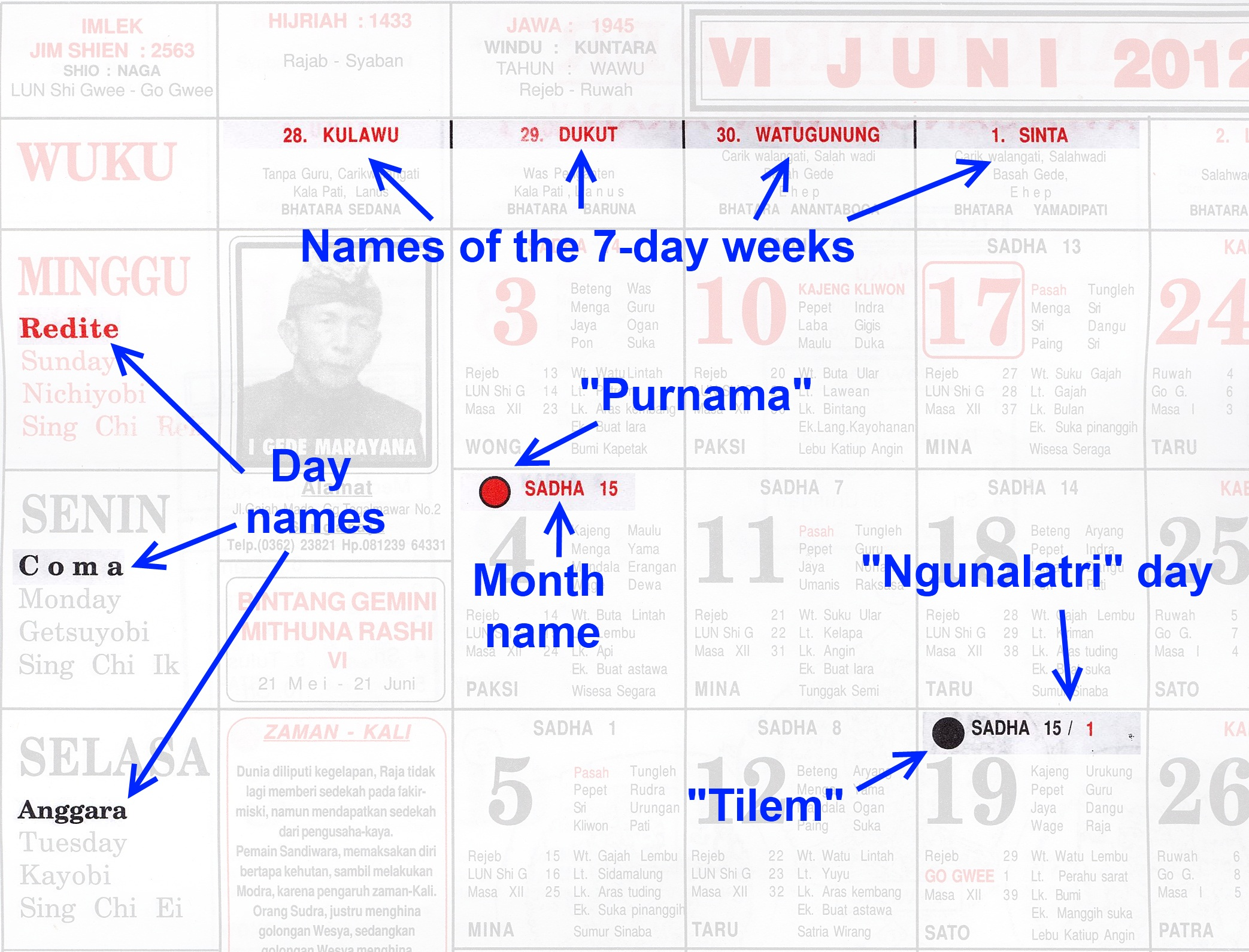
Information about the Saka calendar on a Balinese wall calendar

The calendar is lunisolar: the Saka year comprises 12 months, or sasih, each consisting of 30 days. However, because the lunar cycle is slightly shorter than 30 days, and because the lunar year has a length of 354 or 355 days, the calendar is adjusted to prevent it losing synchronization with the lunar or solar cycles. The months are adjusted by allocating two lunar days to one solar day every 9 weeks. This solar day is called ngunalatri, Sanskrit for "minus one night". To stop the Saka year from deviating unduly from the solar year – as happens with the Islamic calendar – an extra intercalary month is inserted after the 11th month (when it is known as Mala Jiyestha), or after the 12th month (Mala Sadha). The length of these months is calculated according to the normal 63-day cycle. An intercalary month is added whenever necessary to prevent the final day of the 7th month, known as Tilem Kapitu, from falling in the Gregorian month of December.

The names the 12 months are taken from a mixture of Old Balinese and Sanskrit words for the ordinal numbers from 1 to 12, and are as follows:

1. Kasa
2. Karo
3. Katiga
4. Kapat
5. Kalima
6. Kanem
7. Kapitu
8. Kawalu
9. Kasanga
10. Kadasa
11. Jyestha
12. Sadha

Each month begins the day after a new moon and has 15 days of waxing moon until the full moon (Purnama), then 15 days of waning, ending on the new moon (Tilem). Both sets of days are numbered 1 to 15. The first day of the year is usually the day after the first new moon in March. Note, however, that Nyepi falls on the first day of Kadasa, and that the years of the Saka era are counted from that date.

== Use ==
Year numbering in the calendar is 78 years behind the Gregorian calendar, and is calculated from (its "epoch" is) the beginning of the Saka Era in India. It is used alongside the 210-day Balinese pawukon calendar, and Balinese festivals can be calculated according to either year. The Indian Saka calendar was used for royal decrees as early as the ninth century CE. The same calendar was used in Java until Sultan Agung replaced it with the Javanese calendar in 1633.

== Notable days ==
The Balinese Hindu festival of Nyepi, the day of silence, marks the start of the Saka year. Tilem Kapitu, the last day of the 7th month, is known as Siva Ratri, and is a night dedicated to the god Shiva. Devotees stay up all night and meditate. There are another 24 ceremonial days in the Saka year, usually celebrated at Purnama (full moon).

== Bibliography ==
- Eiseman, Fred B. Jr. (1989). Bali: Sekalia and Niskala. Vol. I: Essays on Religion, Ritual and Art. Periplus Editions. pp. 182–185. ISBN 0-945971-03-6. OCLC 909718826.
- Haer, Debbie Guthrie; Morillot, Juliette; Toh, Irene (1995). Bali, a Traveller's Companion. Editions Didier Millet. ISBN 981-3018-496.
- Hobart, Angela; Ramseyer, Urs; Leeman, Albert (1996). The Peoples of Bali. Blackwell Publishers. ISBN 0-631-17687-X.
- Ricklefs, Merle Calvin (1981). A History of Modern Indonesia: C. 1300 to the present. MacMillan. ISBN 978-0-333-24380-0.
