= George Turnbull =

George Turnbull may refer to:

- George Turnbull (theologian) (1698–1748), Scottish theologian
- George Turnbull (soldier) (1729–1810), Scotland-born loyalist soldier in the American Revolutionary War
- George Turnbull (engineer) (1809–1889), civil engineer active in the UK and India
- George Stanley Turnbull (1882–1977), journalist, historian, and dean of the University of Oregon School of Journalism
- George Turnbull (businessman) (1926–1992), British car manufacturer, associated with British Leyland and Hyundai
- George Turnbull (footballer, born 1911) (1911–1996), English football forward, active 1930s
- George Turnbull (footballer, born 1927) (1927–2002), English football goalkeeper, active 1950s
- George Turnbull (rugby union) (1877–1970), Scottish rugby union player
- George Turnbull of Abbey St Bathans (1793–1855), Scottish lawyer, landowner and agricultural improver
