= French submarine Roland Morillot (S613) =

Type XXI submarine of German Kriegsmarine origin, used by the French Navy after WWII

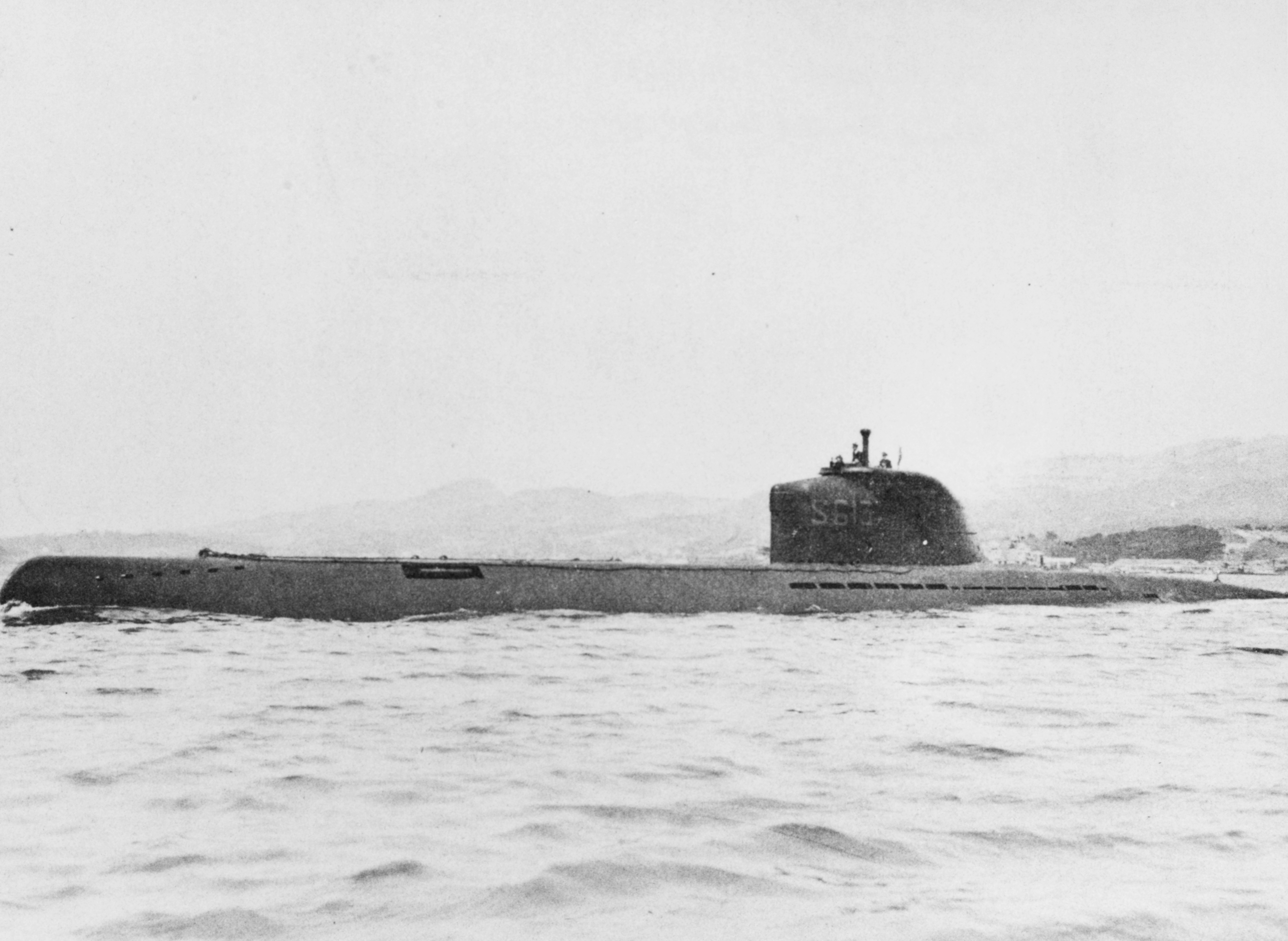
- Roland Morillot (ex U-2518) at sea circa 1950

History

Nazi Germany
- Name: U-2518
- Ordered: 6 November 1943
- Builder: Blohm & Voss, Hamburg
- Yard number: 2518
- Laid down: 16 August 1944
- Launched: 4 October 1944
- Commissioned: 4 November 1944
- Fate: Surrendered on 9 May 1945; Transferred to France on 14 February 1946

France
- Name: Roland Morillot
- Namesake: Roland Morillot
- Acquired: August 1945
- In service: 14 February 1946
- Out of service: 17 October 1967
- Fate: Sold for scrapping on 21 May 1969

General characteristics
- Class & type: Type XXI submarine
- Displacement: 1,621 t (1,595 long tons) surfaced; 2,100 t (2,067 long tons) submerged
- Length: 76.70 m (251 ft 8 in) (o/a)
- Beam: 8 m (26 ft 3 in)
- Height: 11.30 m (37 ft 1 in)
- Draught: 6.32 m (20 ft 9 in)
- Propulsion: Diesel/Electric; 2 × MAN M6V40/46KBB supercharged 6-cylinder diesel engines, 4,000 PS (2,900 kW; 3,900 shp); 2 × SSW GU365/30 double acting electric motors, 5,000 PS (3,700 kW; 4,900 shp); 2 × SSW GV232/28 silent running electric motors, 226 PS (166 kW; 223 shp)
- Speed: Surfaced: 15.6 knots (28.9 km/h; 18.0 mph) (diesel); 17.9 knots (33.2 km/h; 20.6 mph) (electric); Submerged: 17.2 knots (31.9 km/h; 19.8 mph) (electric); 6.1 knots (11.3 km/h; 7.0 mph) (silent running motors)
- Range: 15,500 nmi (28,700 km; 17,800 mi) at 10 knots (19 km/h; 12 mph) surfaced; 340 nmi (630 km; 390 mi) at 5 knots (9.3 km/h; 5.8 mph) submerged
- Test depth: 240 m (790 ft)
- Complement: 5 officers, 52 enlisted
- Sensors & processing systems: Type F432 D2 Radar Transmitter; FuMB Ant 3 Bali Radar Detector
- Armament: 6 × bow torpedo tubes; 23 × 53.3 cm (21 in) torpedoes; or 17 × torpedoes and 12 × mines; 4 × 2 cm (0.79 in) C/30 AA guns

Service record (Kriegsmarine)
- Part of: 31st U-boat Flotilla; 4 November 1944 – 1 April 1945; 11th U-boat Flotilla; 1 April – 8 May 1945
- Identification codes: M 49 105
- Commanders: Kptlt. Friedrich Weidner; 4 November 1944 – 9 May 1945
- Operations: None
- Victories: None

German submarine U-2518 was a Type XXI U-boat of Nazi Germany's Kriegsmarine at the end of World War II, which later served in the French Navy, where she was commissioned as Roland Morillot, in honour of Roland Morillot, a French submarine officer killed in 1915.

== Service history ==
=== Kriegsmarine ===
The submarine was laid down on 16 August 1944 at the Blohm & Voss yard at Hamburg, launched on 4 October 1944, and commissioned on 4 November 1944 under the command of Oberleutnant zur See Friedrich Weidner. After training with 31st U-boat Flotilla, U-2518 was transferred to 11th U-boat Flotilla for front-line service on 1 April 1945, though this was too late for the U-boat to sail on any combat patrols or sink any ships. On 9 May 1945, she surrendered to British forces at Horten Naval Base, Norway. She was taken to Lisahally, Londonderry. U-2518 was handed over by the British to the French Marine Nationale. On her journey from Lisahally to France, she stopped in Dún Laoghaire in February 1946.

=== Marine Nationale ===
The U-boat arrived at Cherbourg on 26 February 1946, and after repairs made her first voyage on 20 August. In January 1948 she sailed from Toulon to Casabianca completely submerged, and in April 1948 was permanently assigned to the Navy. On 14 February 1951 she was renamed Roland Morillot. In August 1956 she took part in Operation Musketeer during the Suez Crisis. In 1967 the submarine was placed in reserve, and on 21 May 1969 was sold to Lotti S.p.A. at La Spezia for scrapping.

== See also ==
- Laubie (S610), a Type VIIC U-boat, that served in the French Navy, 1945–1961

== Bibliography ==
- Busch, Rainer; Röll, Hans-Joachim (1999). German U-boat commanders of World War II : a biographical dictionary. Translated by Brooks, Geoffrey. London, Annapolis, Md: Greenhill Books, Naval Institute Press. ISBN 1-55750-186-6.
- Busch, Rainer; Röll, Hans-Joachim (1999). Deutsche U-Boot-Verluste von September 1939 bis Mai 1945 [German U-boat losses from September 1939 to May 1945]. Der U-Boot-Krieg (in German). Vol. IV. Hamburg; Berlin; Bonn: Mittler. ISBN 3-8132-0514-2.
- Gröner, Erich; Jung, Dieter; Maass, Martin (1991). German Warships 1815–1945, U-boats and Mine Warfare Vessels. Vol. 2. Translated by Thomas, Keith; Magowan, Rachel. London: Conway Maritime Press. ISBN 0-85177-593-4.
