= Trible (surname) =

Origin
- Origin: English
- Region of origin: English

Other names
- Variant forms: Trimble, Treble, Tribble

Trible is a surname. Notable persons with that surname include:

- Paul S. Trible Jr. (born 1946), an attorney and Republican politician from Virginia
- Phyllis Trible (born 1932), a feminist biblical scholar from Richmond, Virginia, United States
