= French ship Roland =

Several ships of the French Navy have been named Roland; these include:

- French ship Roland (1771), a 64-gun ship of the line
- French corvette Roland (1850), an eight-gun corvette launched in 1850
- French cruiser Roland, an unprotected cruiser built in the 1870s

== See also ==
- French ship Roland Morillot
