= French ship Roland Morillot =

Three ships of the French Navy, all submarines, have borne the name Roland Morillot (pronounced [ʁɔlɑ̃ mɔʁijo]) in honour of lieutenant de vaisseau Roland Morillot:

- French submarine Roland Morillot (E1), a captured German Type UB II submarine
- Roland Morillot, the first submarine of the Roland Morillot class, an improvement of the Redoutable class, destroyed on the construction slip in 1940 prior to being launched
- French submarine Roland Morillot (S613), a captured German Type XXI submarine

== See also ==
- French ship Roland
