= Fatlips Castle =

16th-century tower house in Scotland

Coordinates: 55°28′48″N 2°39′47″W

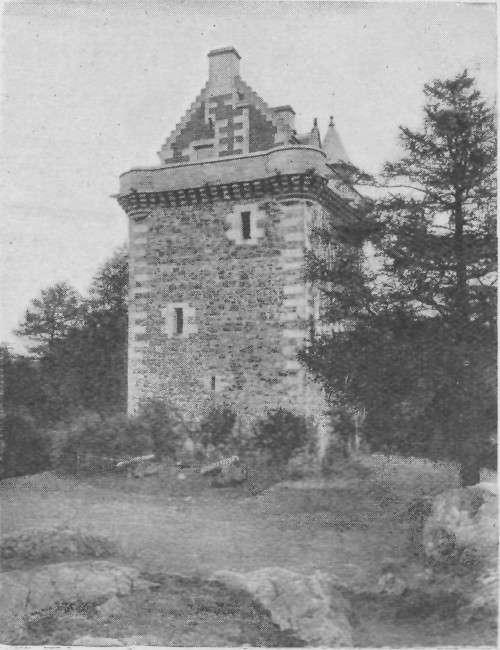
Early photograph of Fatlips, showing the work of Lorimer around the castellation

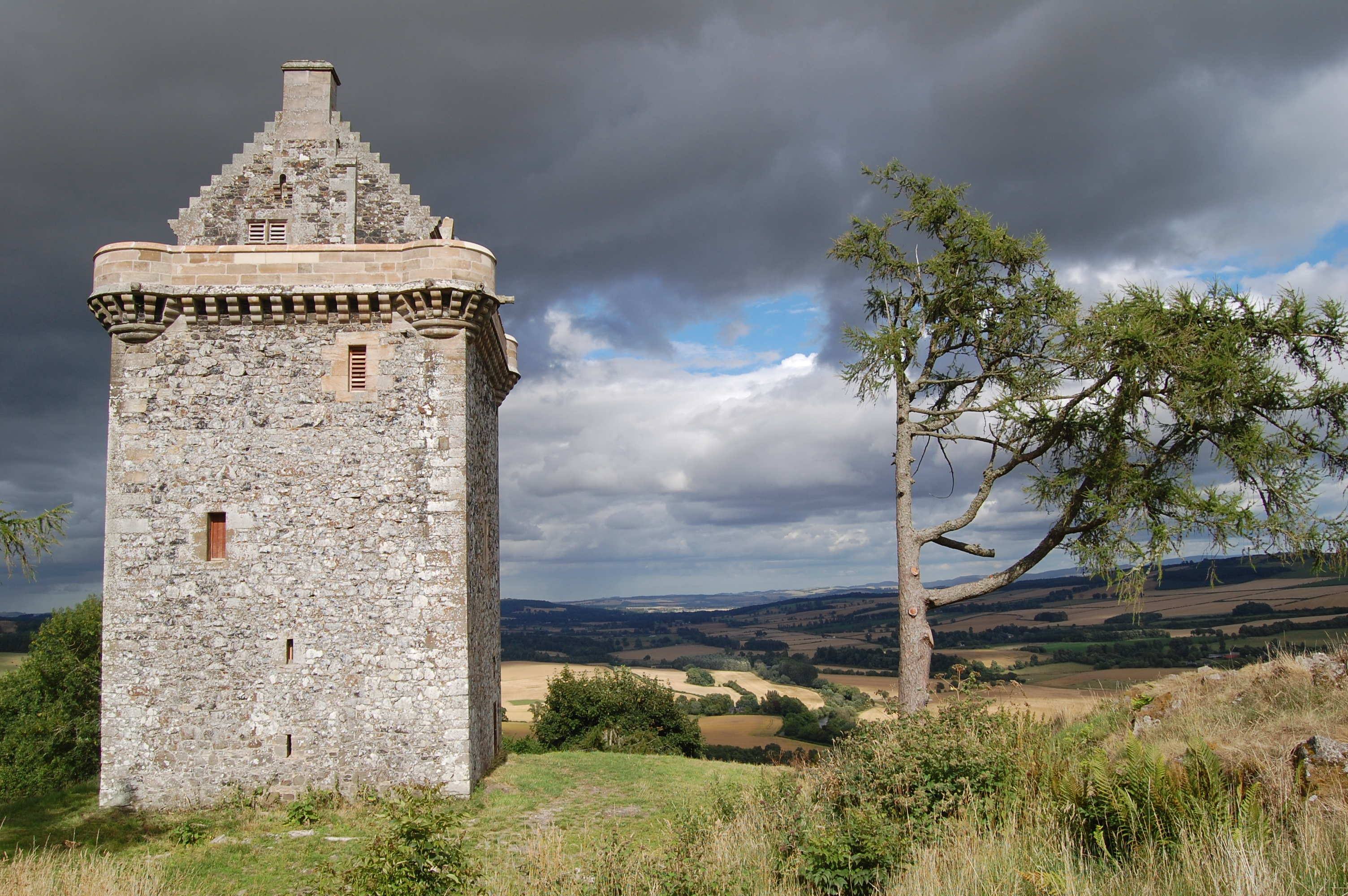
Post renovation from the North, taken August 2013

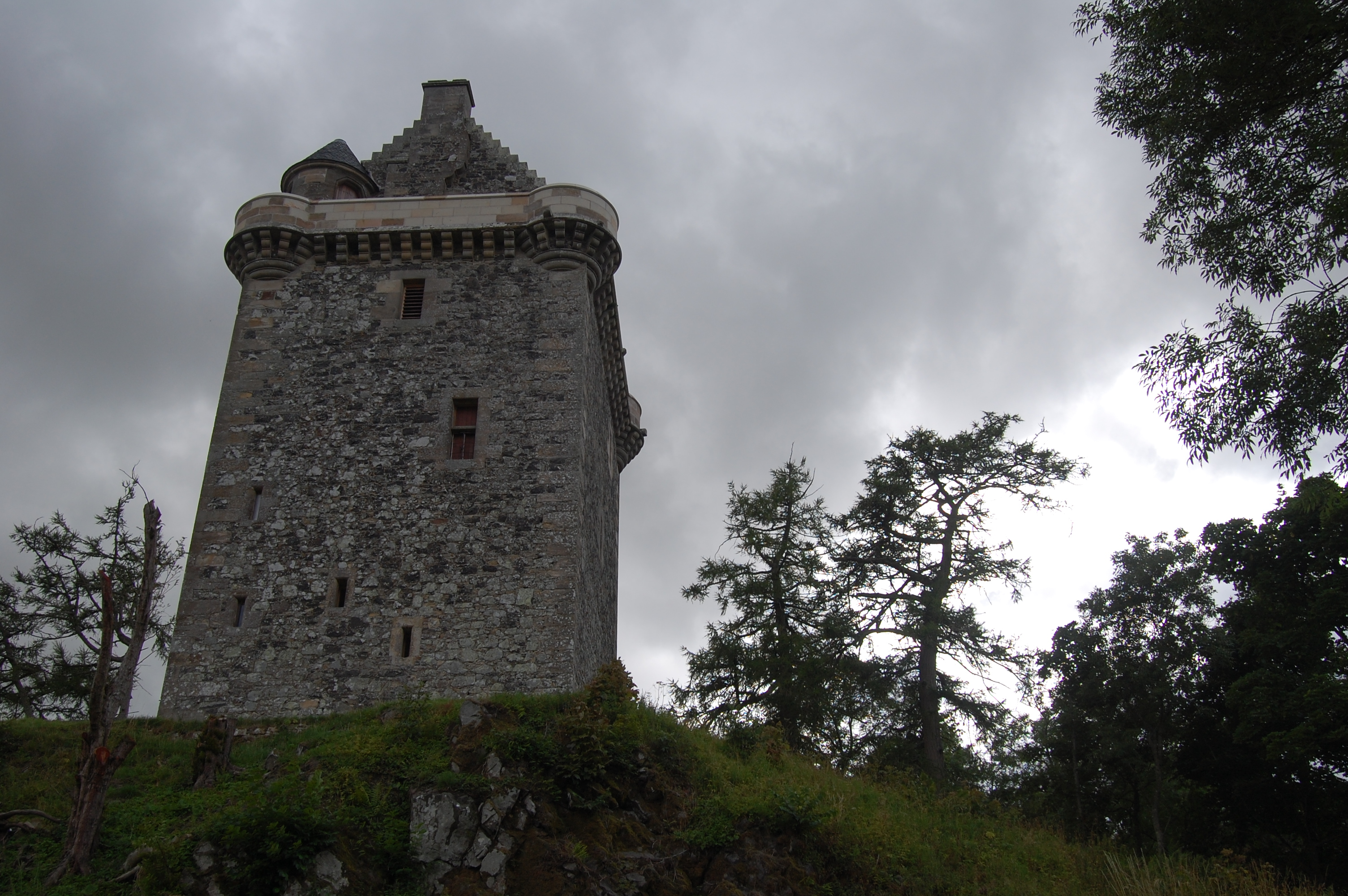
Post renovation from the South, taken August 2013

Fatlips Castle is a peel tower in Roxburghshire, in the Scottish Borders. Situated at the top of Minto Crags, above the River Teviot, it was built in the 16th century by the Turnbulls of Barnhills, notorious Border reivers, and owners of nearby Barnhills Tower and farm. In 1545, during the War of the Rough Wooing, the Earl of Hertford burned "Mantoncrake", or Mynto Crag.

== Name ==
The castle is said to have obtained its unusual name from the habit of the members of the house to greet guests with less discretion than was considered decent at the time. One of the pleasures of a visit to Fatlips used to be that "every gentleman, by indefeasible privilege, kisses one of the ladies on entering the ruin."

== History ==
The castle was acquired by Sir Gilbert Elliot in 1705, whose family eventually became the Earls of Minto. It was extensively restored in 1857, while the interior was renovated by Sir Robert Lorimer in 1897–8 as a shooting lodge and private museum. The building was in use until the 1960s. On 18 November 2011, it was announced that a major restoration of the building would take place, with work expected to be complete by 2013. In mid-2013, the cap-house, parapet and roof were successfully renovated.

== Description ==
The rectangular tower is 26 feet 9 inches (8.15 m) from north to south, and 32 feet 3 inches (9.83 m) from east to west. It comprises four storeys plus an attic, which is surrounded by a 19th-century parapet walk.

== Conservation ==
It is designated by Historic Environment Scotland as a scheduled monument.
