= John Turnbull =

John or Jack Turnbull may refer to:

- Jack Turnbull (footballer) (1885–1917), Australian rules footballer
- Jack Turnbull (lacrosse) (1910–1944), American lacrosse player
- Jack Turnbull (rugby union), Australian international rugby union player
- John E. Turnbull, Canadian inventor of the first rolling wringer clothes washer, 1843
- John Turnbull (voyager), English explorer to the Pacific in 1800–1805
- John Turnbull (actor) (1880–1956), British film actor
- John Turnbull (priest) (1905–1979), English Anglican priest
- John Turnbull (cricketer) (born 1935), New Zealand cricketer
- John Turnbull (musician) (born 1950), English pop and rock guitarist and singer
- John W. Turnbull (born 1936), Canadian politician in the Legislative Assembly of New Brunswick
