= James Youll Turnbull =

VC & Scottish rugby union player

- James Youll Turnbull as depicted on a cigarette card
- Born: 24 December 1883; Glasgow, Lanarkshire, Scotland
- Died: 1 July 1916 (aged 32); Leipzig Salient, Authuille, France
- Burial place: Lonsdale Cemetery, Authuille
- Military career
- Allegiance: United Kingdom
- Branch: British Army
- Rank: Sergeant
- Units: 3rd Lanarkshire Rifle Volunteers; 17th Battalion, The Highland Light Infantry
- Conflicts: First World War: Western Front; Battle of the Somme; Battle of Albert; First day on the Somme; Attack on Leipzig Salient †
- Awards: Victoria Cross
- Other work: Played rugby for Cartha Queens Park RFC

James Youll Turnbull VC (24 December 1883 – 1 July 1916) was a Scottish recipient of the Victoria Cross, the highest and most prestigious award for gallantry in the face of the enemy that can be awarded to British and Commonwealth forces.

Before the First World War, he played rugby for Cartha Queens Park RFC and was a member of the 3rd Battalion of the Lanarkshire Rifle Volunteers.

He was a sergeant in the 17th Battalion (Glasgow Commercials), The Highland Light Infantry, British Army during the Battle of the Somme in First World War. On 1 July 1916, Turnbull was awarded the VC for his actions at Leipzig Salient, Authuille, France, where Turnbull's party captured a post of apparent importance, and defended it "almost single-handed[ly]". Later in the day he was killed while engaged in a bombing counter-attack. He was 32 years old.

== Citation ==
For most conspicuous bravery and devotion to duty, when, having with his party captured a post apparently of great importance to the enemy, he was subjected to severe counter-attacks, which were continuous throughout the whole day. Although his party was wiped out and replaced several times during the day, Serjeant Turnbull never wavered in his determination to hold the post, the loss of which would have been very serious. Almost, single-handed, he maintained his position, and displayed the highest degree of valour and skill in the performance of his duties. Later in the day this very gallant soldier was killed whilst bombing a counter-attack from the parados of our trench.

— The London Gazette," No. 29836, 24 November 1916

Turnbull's grave is located at Lonsdale Cemetery, (four miles north of Albert) Authuille, France in Plot IV, Row G, Grave 9.

== Bibliography ==
- Ross, Graham (1995). Scotland's Forgotten Valour. MacLean Press. ISBN 978-1899272006.
- Gliddon, Gerald (2011) [1991]. Somme 1916. VCs of the First World War. The History Press. ISBN 978-0-7524-6303-2.
