= James Trimble =

James Trimble may refer to:

- James A. Trimble (1847–?), street car works, 218 East 28th St., New York
- James Travis Trimble Jr. (born 1932), United States federal judge
- James William Trimble (1894–1972), Member of the US House of Representatives
- Jim Trimble, American college football coach
- James Trimble (Canadian politician) (died 1885), Speaker of the British Columbia legislature
- James Trimble III (1925–1945), baseball player and U.S. Marine
