= Barnhills Tower =

Tower house in Scottish Borders, Scotland, UK

Coordinates: 55.48273°N 2.65172°W

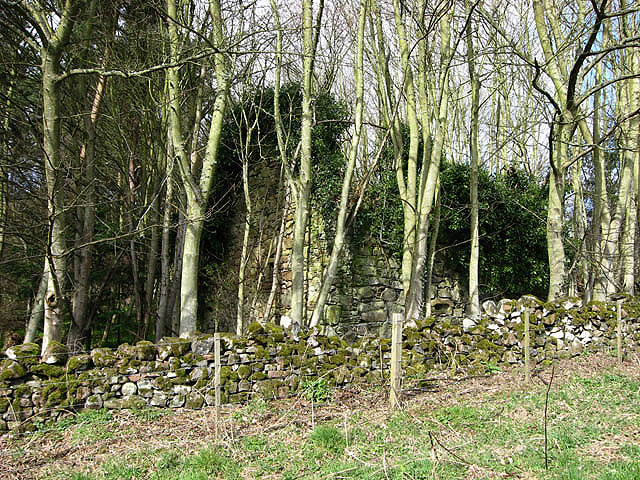
Barnhills Tower A 16th century fortified tower house, now in ruins, standing in a woodland strip by Craigend Burn. This view from an adjacent field, shows gunloops on the outer walls of the ivy-clad ruin. The ground floor chamber was originally barrel-vaulted.

Barnhills Tower was a 16th-century tower house about 4.5 miles (7.2 km) west of Jedburgh in the Scottish Borders, Scotland, north of the River Teviot, on the high left bank of the Craigend Burn.

== History ==
The Turnbulls owned the property, which was burnt by the English in 1545, by the Earl of Hertford, during the Rough Wooing, but it was still one of the houses appointed to watch the fords of the River Tweed in 1548–9.

Older renderings of the castle name are “Barne helles” and “Barnehyll”.

== Structure ==
All that remains of the castle is the vaulted basement, and trace of a stair in a corner The tower is oblong, built of rubble, mainly freestone. It measured about 34 feet (10 m) by 25 feet (7.6 m), the north–south axis being longer. The surviving windows have chamfered freestone dressings.

The entrance was in the east wall, with three steps beyond leading down to the ground floor. A staircase ran southward in the thickness of the wall towards the south east angle, and there are traces of this.
