= Alan Turnbull =

Alan Turnbull may refer to:

- Alan Turnbull, Lord Turnbull, Scottish lawyer
- Alan Turnbull (drummer), Australian drummer
- Alan Turnbull (scientist), British corrosion scientist and engineer
