= Lee Turnbull =

Lee Turnbull may refer to:

- Lee Turnbull (actor), English television and film actor
- Lee Turnbull (footballer) (born 1967), English football player, manager, and scout
