= Tribble (surname) =

- Pronunciation: /ˈtrɪbəl/

Origin
- Origin: English
- Region of origin: English

Other names
- Variant forms: Trimble, Treble, Trible

Tribble is a surname. Notable persons with that surname include, in order of birth date (where known):

- Rev. Andrew Tribble (1741–1822), an early Baptist Preacher
- Andrew Tribble (1879-1935) American comedian and female impersonator
- Samuel J. Tribble (1869–1916), a former U.S. Representative of Georgia's 8th Congressional District
- Charles Tribble (1942–2009), an American wrestler
- Keith R. Tribble (born 1955), a former CEO of the Orange Bowl Committee and athletic director of University of Central Florida
- DeJuan Tribble (born 1985), an American football player
- Bob Tribble, a professor at Texas A&M University with research interests in high energy nuclear physics and nuclear astrophysics
- Bud Tribble, a computer software developer
- Jeffery Tribble, an ordained elder in the African Methodist Episcopal Zion Church
