= Ian Turnbull =

Ian Turnbull may refer to:

- Ian Turnbull (politician) (born 1935), Canadian politician, teacher and international consultant
- Ian Turnbull (ice hockey) (born 1953), Canadian former ice hockey player
