= James A. Trimble =

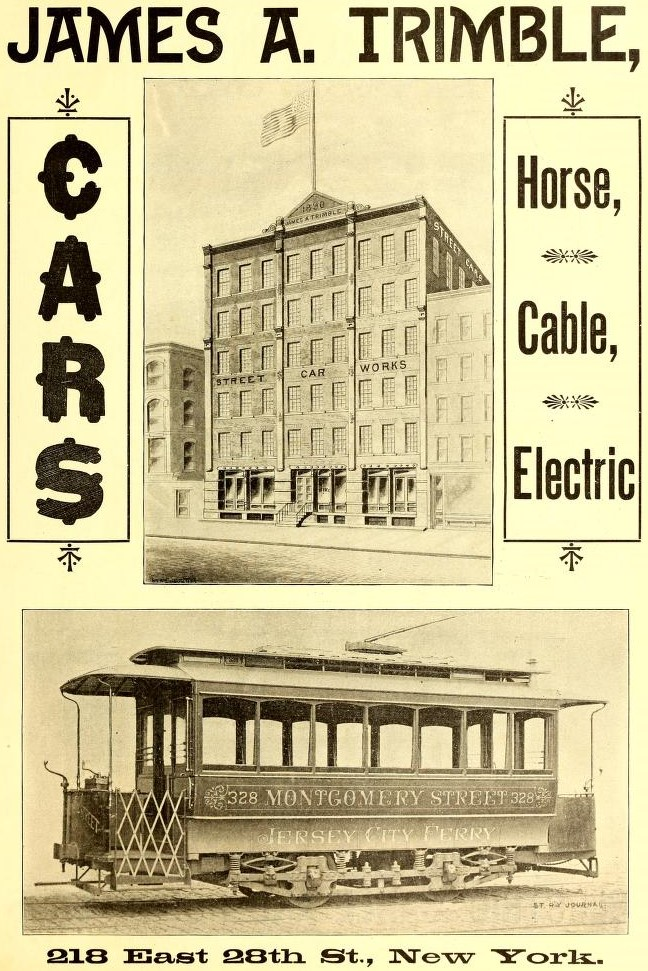
James A. Trimble street car works

James A. Trimble (born 1847 in New York City) was an inventor and the founder of his namesake street car works, established in 1869. The company was located at 218 East 28th St. in New York in a 6-story building. Trimble produced horse, cable and electric cars. Trimble's company built one of the mail carrying streetcars used in the city. Trimble was an inventor and secured several patents for improvements.

The Brooklyn & N.Y. Railway Supply Co. of Elizabeth, New Jersey (1895–1897) was formed by a merger of J.W. Fowler Car Company and James A. Trimble Company. Trimble became president of the new company which relocated his equipment from New York to Elizabethtown. The new operation, of which Trimble served as president, anticipated production of 1,500 cars annually.
