= Robert Turnbull =

Robert Turnbull may refer to:

- Bob Turnbull (1894–1946), Scottish footballer
- Bobby Turnbull (1895–1952), English footballer
- Robert Turnbull (American politician) (1850–1920), U.S. Representative from Virginia
- Robert Turnbull (Australian politician) (c. 1819–1872), member of the Victorian Legislative Council
- Robert Turnbull (railway manager) (1852–1925), general manager and director of the LNWR
- Robert James Turnbull (1775–1833), South Carolina planter and nullification advocate
