= Stephen Turnbull =

Stephen or Steven Turnbull may refer to:

- Stephen Turnbull (historian) (born 1948), British academic, historian, and writer
- Stephen Turnbull (footballer, born 1987), English footballer
- Steven Turnbull (rugby union) (born 1987), Scottish rugby union player
- Stephen Turnbull (soccer, born 1998), American soccer player
