= Andrew Turnbull =

Andrew Turnbull may refer to:

== People ==
- Andrew Turnbull (colonist) (1718–1792), early colonizer of Florida
- Andrew Turnbull (biographer) (1921–1970), American biographer and essayist
- Andrew Turnbull, Baron Turnbull (born 1945), head of the British Civil Service and Cabinet Secretary
- Andrew Turnbull (rugby union) (born 1982), Scottish rugby union player
- Andrew B. Turnbull (1884–1960), first president of the Green Bay Packers and newspaper owner
- Drew Turnbull (1930–2012), Scottish rugby union and rugby league footballer of the 1940s and 1950s

== Vessels ==
- SS Andrew Turnbull, a Liberty ship
