= Ray Turnbull =

Ray Turnbull may refer to:

- Ray Turnbull (American football) (1880–1939), American football player and coach, physician
- Ray Turnbull (curler) (1939–2017), Canadian curler
