= Ken Turnbull =

Canadian football player (1920–2008)

Profile
- Position: End

Personal information
- Born: February 10, 1920
- Died: September 14, 2008 (aged 88)
- Listed weight: 196 lb (89 kg)

Career history
- 1947: Toronto Argonauts

Awards and highlights
- Grey Cup champion (1947)

Kenneth Donald Chisholm Turnbull (February 10, 1920 – September 14, 2008) was a Canadian football player who played for the Toronto Argonauts. He won the Grey Cup with them in 1947.
