= Trimble =

Trimble could refer to:

== Places ==
United States

- Trimble, Alabama (Cullman County)
- Trimble, Colorado, an unincorporated community
- Trimble, Georgia (Troup County)
- Trimble, Illinois (Crawford County)
- Trimble, Kentucky (Pulaski County)
- Trimble, Missouri (Clinton County)
- Trimble, Ohio (Athens County)
- Trimble, Tennessee (Dyer County)
- Trimble, Virginia (Highland County)
- Trimble's Iron Works, Kentucky (Greenup County—Historical town)
- Trimble's Mills, North Carolina (Duplin County—Historical town)
- Trimble County, Kentucky
- Trimble Island, Puget Sound, Washington
- Trimble Knob, Virginia
- Trimble Technical High School, Fort Worth, Texas
- Mount Trimble, West Virginia
- Trimble Mountain, Maine

== Other uses ==
- Trimble (surname), including a list of people with the name
- Trimble Inc., an American multinational technology company
