= John E. Turnbull =

Canadian inventor

John E. Turnbull was a Canadian inventor who lived in Saint John, New Brunswick in the 19th century. He is notable for inventing the first rolling wringer clothes washer in 1843.
