= Roland Morillot =

French naval officer and submarine commander during World War I

Roland Morillot (French: [ʁɔlɑ̃ mɔʁijo]; 13 June 1885 – 29 December 1915) was a French naval officer and hero of the early age of submarines. He was the brother of painter Octave Morillot and the son of the deputy Léon Morillot.

== Biography ==
Morillot was born at the château de Bussemont in Saint-Lumier-la-Populeuse.

== Career ==
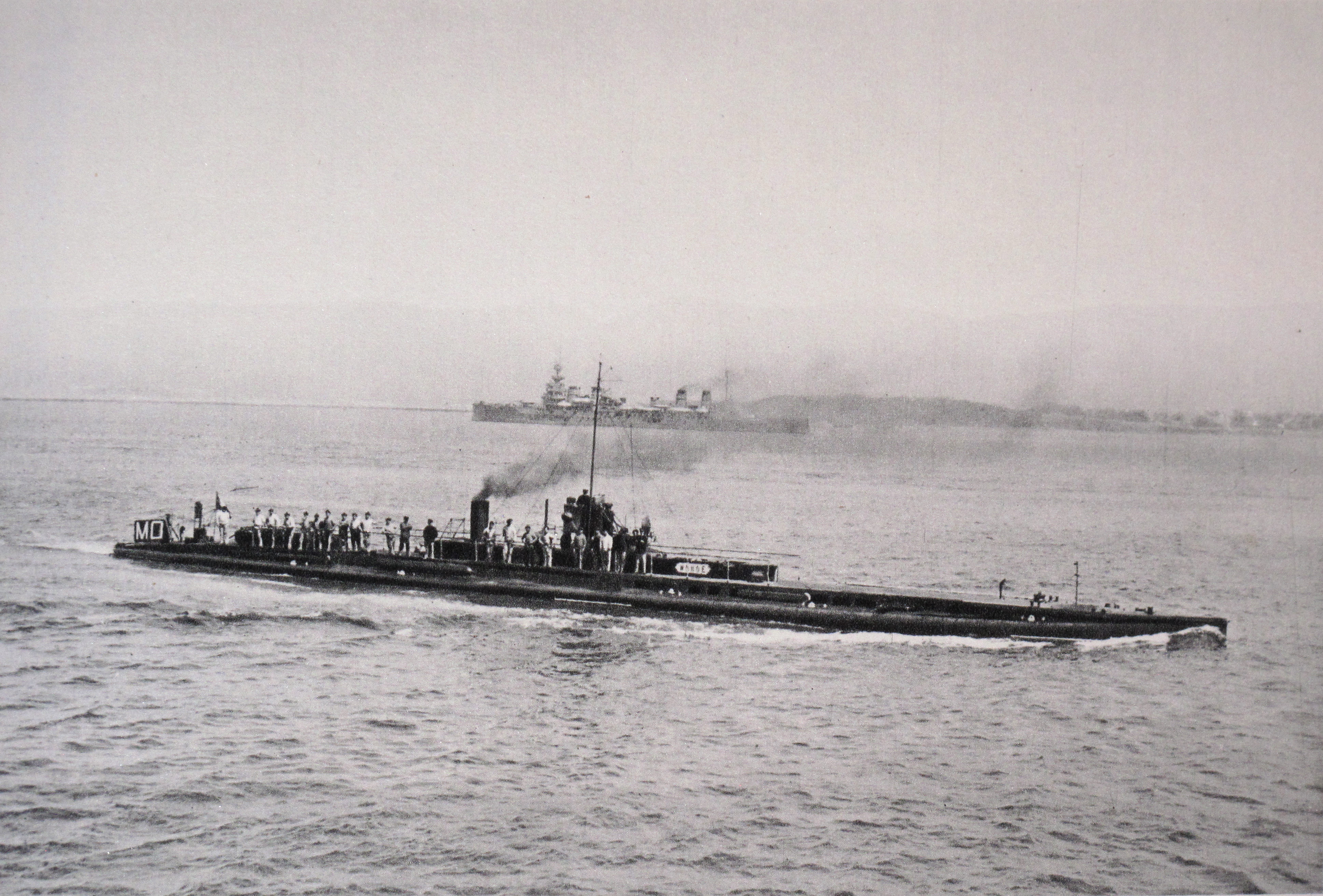
The Monge

Morillot captained the French submarine Monge when she was sunk by SMS Helgoland on the night of 28–29 December 1915. He ordered the ship evacuated and sank with her as he made certain that his men escaped to safety. The entire crew was saved, except Morillot and two non-commissioned officers.

== Honours ==
- Knight of the Legion of Honour (Chevalier de la Légion d'Honneur) - French Republic
- Gold Medal of Military Valour (Medaglia d'Oro al Valor Militare) - Kingdom of Italy
- Mention in the Army Despatches (Citation à l'Ordre de l'Armée) 22 March 1916 - French Republic

Three submarines were named in his honour.
