= Fred Turnbull =

Fred Turnbull may refer to:

- Fred Turnbull (footballer, born 1946), English footballer for Aston Villa
- Fred Turnbull (footballer, born 1888) (1888–1959), English footballer for Coventry City and Southampton
- Fred Turnbull (Australian footballer) (1884–1947), Australian rules footballer
