= Peter Turnbull =

Peter Turnbull may refer to:

- Peter Turnbull (RAAF officer) (1917–1942), Australian fighter ace
- Peter Turnbull (author) (born 1950), English novelist
- Peter Turnbull (footballer) (1873–1942), Scottish footballer
- Peter Turnbull (cricketer) (born 1989), Welsh cricketer
