= Percival Turnbull =

Australian-born New Zealand cricketer

Personal information
- Full name: Percival James Turnbull
- Born: 25 October 1862; Hobart, Tasmania, Australia
- Died: 12 March 1937 (aged 74); Christchurch, Canterbury, New Zealand
- Relatives: Albert Turnbull (brother)

Domestic team information
- Years: Team
- 1884/85: Otago
- Only FC: 30 December 1884 Otago v Auckland
- Source: CricketArchive, 1 February 2024

Percival James Turnbull (25 October 1862 – 12 March 1937) was an Australian-born cricketer who played for a single first-class match in New Zealand Otago during the 1884–85 season.

Turnbull was born at Hobart in Tasmania in 1862, although his family had moved to Dunedin in Otago by the time his brother, Albert Turnbull was born four years later. He played club cricket alongside Albert and another brother, Alfred, for the Grange Cricket Club in the city, although he later joined Albion Cricket Club. Considered the team's "champion bowler" during his time playing for Grange, Turnbull made a single first-class appearance for the Otago provincial team during the 1884–85 season.

Playing against Auckland in a game played at Lancaster Park in Christchurch, he opened the bowling and took three wickets. Along with Charlie Frith, who also took three wickets, he was considered a key player as Auckland were dismissed for a total of 83 runs. During the 1886–87 season he played in an Otago team of 22 against the touring Australian team at Carisbrook, taking the wicket of Billy Trumble.

Professionally Turnbull worked as a leather dresser. He died at Christchurch in March 1937 aged 74.
