= Albert Turnbull =

New Zealand cricketer (1866–1929)

Personal information
- Full name: Albert John Turbull
- Born: 29 October 1866; Dunedin, Otago, New Zealand
- Died: 29 November 1929 (aged 63); Dunedin Hospital, Dunedin, Otago, New Zealand
- Relatives: Percival Turnbull (brother)

Domestic team information
- Years: Team
- 1896/97: Otago
- Only FC: 15 January 1897 Otago v Queensland
- Source: CricketArchive, 1 February 2024

Albert John Turnbull (29 October 1866 – 29 November 1929) was a New Zealand cricketer who played a single first-class match for Otago during the 1896–97 season.

Turnbull was born at Dunedin in 1866. Considered a "more than useful bowler", he played club cricket in the city for Grange Cricket Club from the 1884–85 season and served on the club's committee. After returning to Dunedin, having left for New South Wales in 1890, he also played for Albion Cricket Club, captaining the side during the 1895–96 season.

Considered a solid, although slow scoring, batsman, a good change bowler and "a very capable field", Turnbull was considered to be in consideration for a place in the Otago provincial team during the 1895–96 season. In the event he made only a single first-class appearance for side. In a match at Carisbrook in January 1897 against a touring Queensland side he scored a duck in the first innings and a single run in the second; he did not bowl during the match.

Two of Turnbull's brothers, Alfred and Percival, played alongside him for Grange Cricket Club, with Percival Turnbull having played a single first-class match for Otago during the 1884–85 season. Albie Turnbull died at Dunedin Hospital whilst undergoing radium treatment in November 1929. He was aged 63.
