= Millie Reid Trumbull =

American social reformer (1866–1940

- Turnbull, from a 1923 newspaper
- Born: Amelia Reid Wunderlich; December 5, 1866; Iowa, U.S.
- Died: December 4, 1940 (aged 73); Portland, Oregon, U.S.
- Occupations: Clubwoman, social reformer

Amelia "Millie" Reid Wunderlich Trumbull (December 5, 1866 – December 4, 1940) was an American social reformer and clubwoman, based in Portland, Oregon. She took particular interest in issues around child labor, juvenile justice, and prison conditions. She inspected workplaces, issued work permits, and worked for minimum wage laws in her work with the Oregon Industrial Welfare Commission and the Oregon Board of Inspectors of Child Labor.

== Early life and education ==
Trumbull was born in Dubuque, Iowa, the daughter of John Wunderlich and Elizabeth Reid Wunderlich. Her father was born in Germany. She attended the Armour Institute of Technology in Chicago.

== Career ==
Beginning in 1903, Trumbull was longtime secretary of the Oregon Board of Inspectors of Child Labor. and served on the advisory board of the National Child Labor Committee. In 1912 she spoke on "The Betterment of the Factory Girl's Condition", advocating for shorter hours, healthier ventilation and heat, and fairer pay. From 1919 to 1931 she was executive secretary of the Oregon Industrial Welfare Commission. In one notable instance, she denied a permit to violinist Yehudi Menuhin, explaining that the 12-year-old musical prodigy's planned concert in Portland in 1929 would violate state law.

Trumbull was the first head of Portland's juvenile probation department in 1905, and worked with the Prisoners' Aid Society and the American Prison Association. She was president of the Portland Visiting Nurses Association from 1904 to 1913. She was secretary of the Oregon Women's Legislative Council and lobbied for eugenic sterilization and marriage laws. Representing the women's division of the state defense council during World War I, she advocated wartime price regulations on bread and fish. She spoke about industrial nurses in 1921. She was vice-president of the Oregon Consumers League and an officer of the National Consumers League. She spoke on women's suffrage and international peace work, and was an active member of the American Civil Liberties Union (ACLU) and the National Association for the Advancement of Colored People (NAACP).

Trumbull's multiple overlapping appointments and leadership roles, some of them paid, were a matter of some public concern. A legislative effort in 1921 to eliminate her executive position with the Industrial Welfare Commission was defeated. In 1931 she resigned from the commission after her salary was not funded by an appropriations bill.

== Publications ==
- "Under the Committee on the Care of the Sick Poor" (1905)
- "Report of the Child Labor Commission of the State of Oregon" (1907)
- "Probation, Prisons, and Parole: The Honor System of Prison Labor" (1913)
- "Farm for Inebriates is Asked for Portland" (1913)
- "Race Relations on the Pacific Coast" (1927)

== Personal life ==
Wunderlich married railroad representative Bernard Hughes Trumbull in 1887. Her husband was shot on the job in 1909, and died in 1922. She died in 1940, in her seventies, in Portland. Louise and Stephen Wise wrote in tribute that Trumbull lived a "brave and productive life". Trumbull had a lifelong physical disability, mentioned in tributes after she died.
