= J. Gunnar Trumbull =

American political scientist

Gunnar Trumbull is an American political scientist, currently the Philip Caldwell Professor of Business Administration at Harvard Business School. He graduated from Harvard College and MIT. At MIT, he earned a PhD in political science.
