= Barbara Turnbull (nurse) =

New Zealand nurse

Barbara Fay Turnbull is a New Zealand nurse. In 2017 she received the Florence Nightingale Medal for her work with the International Red Cross and Red Crescent Movement in situations of conflict.

== Biography ==
Turnbull is from Dunedin, New Zealand. She was a nurse in New Zealand until 2008, when she joined the New Zealand Red Cross and was posted overseas. The International Red Cross has deployed her on 10 missions to conflict zones, including trips to North Korea and the Democratic Republic of Congo, four trips to Afghanistan and two to Pakistan.
