= David Turnbull =

David Turnbull may refer to:

- David Turnbull (politician) (born 1942), Canadian politician
- David Turnbull (abolitionist) (died 1851), British abolitionist and British consul to Cuba
- David Turnbull (materials scientist) (1915–2007), American physical chemist
- David Turnbull (priest) (1944–2001), Archdeacon of Carlisle
- David Turnbull (footballer) (born 1999), Scottish footballer
- Reg Turnbull (1908–2006), Australian politician, sometimes known as David Turnbull
