= George Turnbull (footballer, born 1927) =

English footballer

Personal information
- Full name: George Frederick Turnbull
- Date of birth: 4 February 1927
- Place of birth: Gateshead, England
- Date of death: 2002 (aged 74–75)
- Position: Goalkeeper

Senior career*
Years	Team	Apps	(Gls)
1949–1950	Alnwick Town		
1950–1951	Grimsby Town	2	(0)
1951–1952	Accrington Stanley	33	(0)
1952–1953	Gateshead	3	(0)
- * Club domestic league appearances and goals

George Frederick Turnbull (4 February 1927 – 2002) was an English professional footballer who played as a goalkeeper.
