= Scott Turnbull =

English actor

- Born: 1981 (age 44–45); Middlesbrough, England
- Education: Liverpool Institute for Performing Arts
- Occupation: Actor

Scott Turnbull (born 1981) is an English actor.

== Early life ==
In 2006, Turnbull graduated from the Liverpool Institute for Performing Arts (LIPA).

== Career ==
=== Television and film career ===
Turnbull first started his career in the last series of the BBC One children's television series Byker Grove in 2006. Later in 2007, he guest starred in "Better Off Dead", the forty-first episode of the twenty-third series of ITV police procedural series, The Bill. In 2008, he guest-starred in the short-lived ITV medical soap opera The Royal Today, as Liam Dooley. In 2013, he guest-starred as Paul in the BAFTA-nominated fantasy/supernatural CBBC television series Wolfblood.

=== Theatre career ===
In 2006, Turnbull made his professional theatre debut as Geordie in Ian Brown's stage adaption of Colin Teevan's How Many Miles To Basra? at the West Yorkshire Playhouse.

Turnbull played the role of the daughter in Selma Dimitrijevic's production of her play titled Gods Are Fallen and All Safety Gone, alongside Sean Campion who played the role of the mother, and presented by Grayscale.

== Filmography ==
Television
Year	Title	Role	Note(s)
2007	The Bill	Jamie Royce	Episode: "Better Off Dead"
2008	The Royal Today	Liam Dooley	Episode: "Episode 1.13"
2013	Wolfblood	Paul	Episode: "Grave Consequences"
