= William Turnbull =

William Turnbull may refer to:

- William Turnbull (bishop) (died 1454), Scottish bishop
- William Turnbull (cricketer) (1879–1959), Scottish cricketer
- Bill Turnbull (1956–2022), British journalist and presenter
- Bill Turnbull (actor), Canadian actor active 1995–present
- William Turnbull (artist) (1922–2012), Scottish artist
- William Turnbull Jr. (1935–1997), American architect
- William Turnbull (New Zealand architect) (1868–1941), architect based in Wellington, New Zealand
- William Turnbull (sailor) (1933–2007), Hong Kong sailor
- William Barclay Turnbull (1811–1863), Scottish antiquary
- William D. Turnbull (1922–2011), American paleontologist
