= Don Turnbull =

Don Turnbull may refer to:

- Don Turnbull (game designer) (1937–2003), British journalist, editor, games designer
- Don Turnbull (tennis) (1909–1994), Australian tennis player
