= Alexander Turnbull =

Alexander Turnbull may refer to:

- Alexander Turnbull (lacrosse) (1872–1956), Canadian lacrosse player
- Alexander Turnbull (bibliophile) (1868–1918), founder of the Alexander Turnbull Library, now held as part of the National Library of New Zealand
- Alexander Douglas Turnbull (1903–1993), politician in British Columbia, Canada
- Sandy Turnbull (Alexander Turnbull, 1884–1917), Scottish football player
