= Stephen Trumbull =

American journalist

Stephen Trumbull (June 4, 1898 – October 19, 1970) was a political reporter at the Miami Herald. He covered state politics for 25 years before his retirement in 1963.

Trumbull attended the University of Michigan school of journalism. He worked in Chicago and New Orleans before coming to Miami in the 1930s, and worked at the Miami Tribune in 1935 before moving to the Herald in 1937.

Trumbull died of pneumonia on October 19, 1970 at the age of 72. He was survived by his wife Jane, a daughter, and two grandchildren. In his book on the seasons of Florida, Jeff Klinkenberg credited him as an influence and inspiration. Trumbull features in 2013-15 "Key West" fiction book series by Peter Wick, also featuring politician Bernie Papy.

Trumbull's works include:

- "Florida's shadowland': a report on Florida's institutions for the mentally ill", Miami Herald, 1949, 24 pages
