= King M. Trimble =

State legislator

Member of the Colorado House of Representatives
- In office 1977–1980

Personal details
- Born: March 27, 1943 Cincinnati, Ohio, U.S.
- Died: November 19, 1998 (aged 55)
- Party: Democratic

King M. Trimble (March 27, 1943 – November 19, 1998) was a state legislator in the state of Colorado. He served in the Colorado House of Representatives from 1977 to 1980.
