= Michael Turnbull =

Michael Turnbull may refer to:

- Michael Turnbull (bishop) (born 1935), Church of England bishop
- Michael Turnbull (soccer) (born 1981), Australian former professional footballer
- Michael G. Turnbull (born 1949), Canadian-born American architect

== See also ==
- Michaela Turnbull, a fictional character from EastEnders
