= Leipzig Salient =

Battle during the First World War

- Part of The Battle of the Somme, First World War
- Battle of the Somme 1 July – 18 November 1916
Date	July 1916
Location	Picardy, France 50°1′N 2°41′E
Result	British victory

Belligerents
British Empire	Germany

Commanders and leaders
Douglas Haig	Erich von Falkenhayn
- Leipzig Salient

The Leipzig Salient was the British term for a German defensive position built in 1915 on the Somme front in France, during the First World War. The Salient was opposite the village of Authuille that contained the Leipzig Redoubt on its west face. The position was to the south-west of the site of the later Thiepval Memorial, north-east of the La Boisselle–Authuille and Thiepval–Aveluy crossroads. The German front line bulged around a quarry which the Germans fortified and enclosed with Hindenburg Trench across the chord of the salient. A redoubt named the Wundtwerk (Wonderwork to the British) lay beyond on a reverse slope. Nab Valley lay on the east side, Thiepval was to the north, with the fortified Mouquet Farm and the village of Pozières to the east.

On the First day on the Somme (1 July 1916), the Leipzig Salient was attacked by the 1/17th Highland Light Infantry (17th HLI) of the 32nd Division. The battalion crept forward at 7.23 a.m., ready to rush the German defences as soon as the British barrage lifted at 7:30 a.m. The Scots advanced until 30–40 yd (27–37 m) short of the German front line, rushed the redoubt when the barrage lifted and caught the German garrison sheltering in their quarry dugouts at the centre of the redoubt. The 17th HLI pressed on to the next objective but were forced back to the Leipzig Redoubt and consolidated with parties of the 2nd King's Own Yorkshire Light Infantry.

The 17th HLI was joined at the redoubt by parties of the 11th Border Regiment, 1st Dorset Regiment and the 19th Lancashire Fusiliers (3rd Salford Pals) during the day and the 17th HLI was withdrawn overnight. British and German attacks at the salient continued during July, when the Reserve Army divisions north of the Albert–Bapaume road reverted to trench warfare, in which the 32nd Division, 25th Division and the 49th (West Riding) Division (X Corps) occupied Leipzig Redoubt in turn during the rest of the month.

The divisions were to push forward to improve their positions and to prevent the Germans from withdrawing troops for operations against the Fourth Army to the south. Both sides made costly attacks but could rarely consolidate gains before being forced out by counter-attacks. Intermittent operations at the Leipzig Salient continued as part of the Battle of Pozières (23 July – 3 September) and the Battle of Thiepval Ridge (26–28 September), when the Thiepval Spur was captured by the 18th (Eastern) Division.

== Background ==
=== 1914 ===
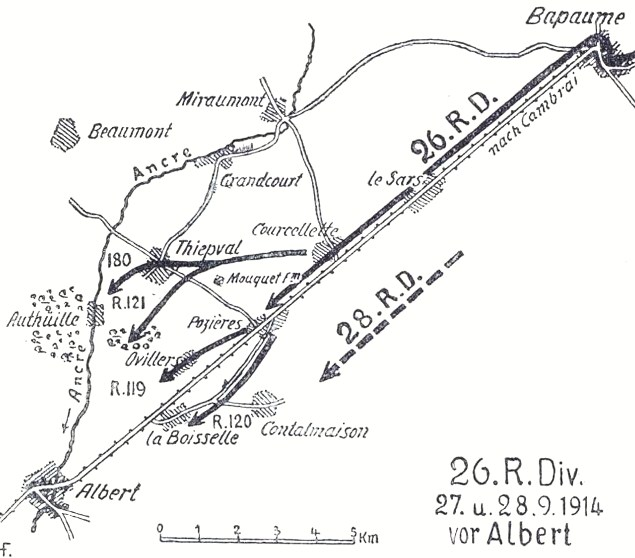
Diagram of the 26th (Württemberg) Reserve Division and the 28th (Baden) Reserve Division attacks towards Albert, late September 1914

On 29 September the 26th Reserve Division attacked eastwards towards Albert and Thiepval on the north side of the Bapaume–Albert road with Reserve Infantry Brigade 51. Thiepval was occupied unopposed but French troops were found to have dug in at Thiepval Wood and German patrols were held up at the Ancre crossings which the French had blocked with barbed wire. An attack by a company of Infantry Regiment 180 on Authuille was brought to a standstill 0.62 mi (1 km) south-west of Thiepval. A French counter-attack from Hamel began in the evening and in the early hours of 30 September, two German companies were surrounded and had to break out to the east.

=== Somme fortifications ===
On the Somme front, the fortification plan ordered by Falkenhayn in January 1915 had been completed during the year. Barbed wire obstacles had been enlarged from one belt 5–10 yd (4.6–9.1 m) wide to two belts 30 yd (27 m) wide and about 15 yd (14 m) apart. Double and triple thickness wire was used and laid 3–5 ft (0.91–1.52 m) high. The front line had been increased from one trench line to three, 150–200 yd (140–180 m) apart, the first trench occupied by sentry groups, the second (Wohngraben) for the bulk of the front-trench garrison and the third trench for local reserves. The trenches were traversed and had sentry-posts in concrete recesses built into the parapet. Dugouts had been deepened from 6–9 ft (1.8–2.7 m) to 20–30 ft (6.1–9.1 m), 50 yd (46 m) apart and large enough for 25 men. An intermediate line of strong points (the Stützpunktlinie) about 1,000 yd (910 m) behind the front line was also built. Communication trenches ran back to the reserve position, renamed the second position, which was as well built and wired as the first position. The second position was beyond the range of Allied field artillery, to force an attacker to stop and move field artillery forward before an attack.

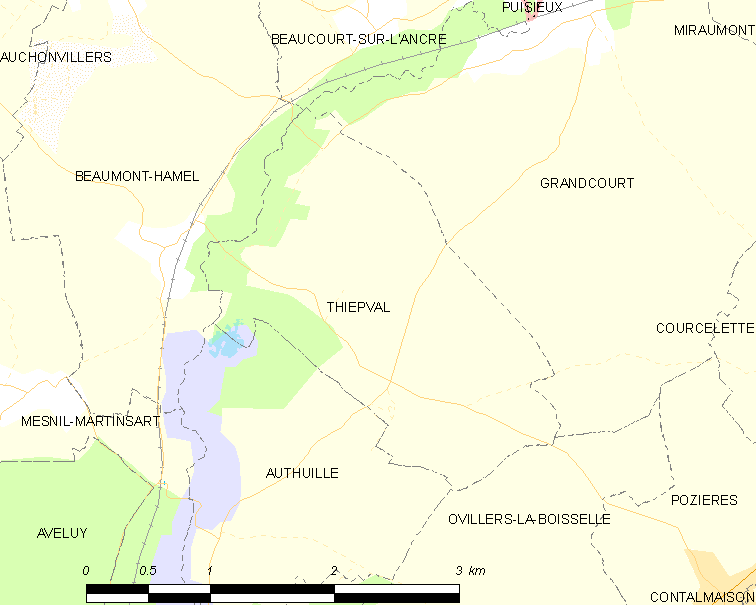
Map of Authuille, Thiepval and vicinity

After the Herbstschlacht (Autumn Battles) of 1915, a third defensive position another 3,000 yd (1.7 mi; 2.7 km) back from the Stützpunktlinie was begun in February 1916 and was almost complete on the Somme front when the battle began. German artillery was organised in a series of Sperrfeuerstreifen (barrage sectors); each officer was expected to know the batteries covering his section of the front line and the batteries ready to engage fleeting targets. A telephone system with lines buried 6 ft (1.8 m) deep for 5 mi (8.0 km) behind the front line, was built to connect the front line to the artillery.

The Somme defences had two inherent weaknesses which the rebuilding had not remedied. The front trenches were on a forward slope, lined by white chalk from the subsoil and easily seen by ground observers. The defences were crowded towards the front trench, with a regiment having two battalions near the front-trench system and the reserve battalion divided between the Stützpunktlinie and the second position, all within 2,000 yd (1,800 m) and most troops within 1,000 yd (910 m) of the front line, accommodated in the new deep dugouts. The concentration of troops at the front line on a forward slope guaranteed that it would face the bulk of an artillery bombardment, directed by ground observers on clearly marked lines.

=== Granatloch (Leipzig Salient) ===
The German fortification programme led to the building of a redoubt south of Thiepval known as Granatloch (Leipzig Salient to the British), where the German line bulged westwards around a derelict chalk quarry. To the south-west lay the Ovillers–Authuille and Thiepval–Aveluy crossroads and more defensive works, Hindenburg Trench, Lemberg Trench and the Wundtwerk (named after Generalleutnant Theodor von Wundt, commander of Reserve Infantry Brigade 51) and known as the Wonderwork by the British, were dug behind the redoubt. Nab Valley lay to the east, Thiepval was to the north and to the north-east near Pozières lay the fortified Mouquet Farm. The salient blocked the route to Schwaben Redoubt at the top of Bazentin Ridge, from which the spurs leading south and south-west could be outflanked. The Wundtwerk was an irregularly shaped six-sided trench network higher up the spur which, with the other fortified places and villages, commanded the approaches to Granatloch.

== Prelude ==
=== German preparations ===
The German front line opposite X Corps was held by eight battalions in the centre of the sector occupied by the 26th Reserve Division, mostly raised in the Kingdom of Württemberg and part of the XIV Reserve Corps (Generalleutnant Hermann von Stein). Opposite the 32nd Division the defences were held by I and II battalions, Reserve Infantry Regiment 99 of Reserve Infantry Brigade 55, each having three companies in the front line and one in reserve, with headquarters in Mouquet Farm to the east. At the south end of the 26th Reserve Division area, Thiepval south was held by Infantry Regiment 180, which had been moved south from Serre in June. The German defences ran along the northern slope of the Ovillers Spur, bent eastwards into Nab Valley then westwards to enclose the west end of Thiepval Spur and the western fringe of Bazentin Ridge, then north to St Pierre Divion on the Ancre river. On most of the front, the German defences were on higher ground but convex slopes meant that much of the Ancre valley to the west was in dead ground. Authuille and Thiepval woods on the east bank of the Ancre and Aveluy Wood on the west side, covered much of the ground behind the British front line, in which assembly positions could be built unseen and then occupied by British troops, as they massed for the attack.

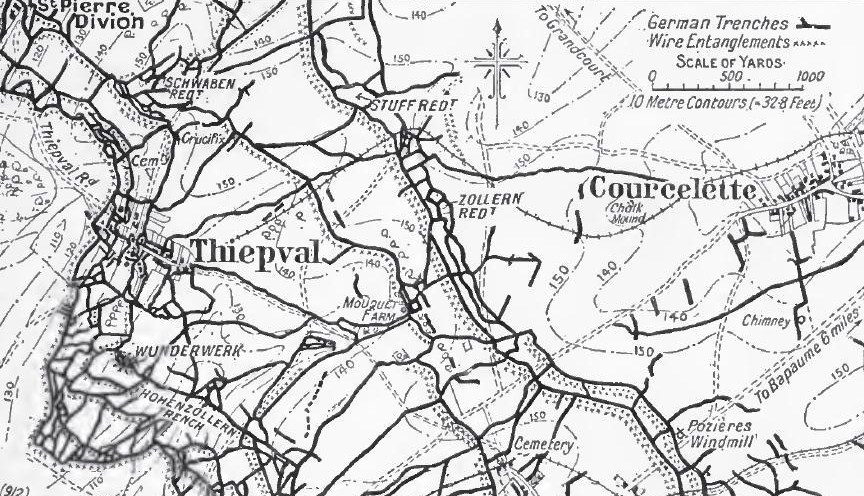
Map of German defensive fortifications from the Leipzig Salient to Courcelette, July 1916

The village of Thiepval was opposite the centre of the X Corps sector, on a spur within the German front position, at the junction with Bazentin Ridge. During the British preparatory bombardment, most of the sixty dwellings in the village were demolished but the house cellars were covered by fallen masonry, which protected them from all but super-heavy shells. None of the German machine-gun positions was hit and shelters excavated under the village, provided accommodation for the garrison during the bombardment and protected ammunition stores and machine-guns, ready to be moved into the open. A chain of cellars, on the west fringe of the village, had been joined to form a connected line of machine-gun posts, which had been kept silent to surprise an attacker. The château ruins in the south-west corner had also been fortified. Both sets of machine-guns could sweep all the upper western slope of Thiepval Spur and enfilade an attack further south as far as Authuille. South of Thiepval, lay the Leipzig Redoubt, at the west end of the Leipzig Salient, containing many machine-guns, which dominated no man's land, from 200–600 yd (180–550 m) wide to the west and the south, the narrowest point being opposite Leipzig Redoubt.

In the German third or reserve trench, four fortified works had been built, the Wundtwerk (Wonderwork) on the reverse slope to the south of the Leipzig Redoubt, out of sight of British ground observers and placed to stop an advance over the spur, if the front trenches were overrun. A second redoubt was built at the back of Thiepval and Schwaben Redoubt atop the Bazentin Ridge, commanding the village and ridge below. Further north the fortified village of St Pierre Divion anchored the first position on the Ancre. An attack on the Leipzig Salient could be engaged by machine-guns in the Nordwerk on Ovillers Spur across Nab Valley, opposite the Nab. On the northern flank, Feste Alt Württemberg (Beaucourt Redoubt) covered the north and north-west slopes of Bazentin Ridge. A second position had been dug from Mouquet Farm to Grandcourt, protected by an intermediate line, from which the Mouquet Switch and the Hansa linie connected to Schwaben Redoubt. Behind the second position, another 3 mi (4.8 km) back, lay the third position, construction of which had begun after the Franco-British offensives of September 1915, which had shown that two defensive positions were no longer sufficient.

=== British preparations ===
Weather 23–30 June 1916
Date	Rain mm	°F	
23	2.0	79°–55°	wind
24	1.0	72°–52°	dull
25	1.0	71°–54°	wind
26	6.0	72°–52°	dull
27	8.0	68°–54°	dull
28	2.0	68°–50°	dull
29	0.1	66°–52°	dull wind
30	0.0	72°–48°	dull rain

The 49th (West Riding) Division, in corps reserve, was to transfer to the command of Lieutenant-General Hubert Gough, commander of the Reserve Army as soon as the assault divisions had taken their objectives, having moved forward before dawn to Aveluy Wood, ready to cross the Ancre. Bridges and causeways had been built for the occasion, shellfire having damaged the banks of the Ancre, which when canalised, had been raised above the old course of the river and had since reverted to marsh. X Corps had two heavy artillery groups and two counter-battery groups under the same commander with two 15-inch, two 12-inch, twelve 9.2-inch, twelve 8-inch and twenty 6-inch howitzers; twenty-eight 60-pounder and four 4.7-inch guns. The field artillery had a hundred and twenty-eight 18-pounder guns, thirty-six 4.5-inch howitzers and a groupe of twelve French 75 mm field guns from the 20th Artillery Regiment. The artillery had been well dug in and covered with steel joists and 3–4 ft (0.91–1.22 m) of soil; there was a heavy gun for each 57 yd (52 m) and a field gun for each 28 yd (26 m) of front.

The bombardment plan had six lifts for the heavy artillery, in which the super-heavy 15-inch and 12-inch howitzers were to lift seven minutes early. A creeping barrage had not been planned but the 18-pounders were to "search" from trench to trench in ten lifts, the 4.5-inch howitzers were to bombard strong points and move back at the same time as the field guns, the bombardment lifting from the German front trench at zero hour, to the reserve line from the Wonderwork to Schwaben Redoubt and St Pierre Divion. No discretion was allowed to subordinate commanders over the bombardment but two 9.2-inch howitzers were kept separate from the barrage, to bombard machine-gun nests about Thiepval. The spur from Auchonvillers to Mesnil and Aveluy Wood, gave good observation to the British and many posts were built along it, particularly a length called Brock's Benefit. The northern part of the corps front had a better view over German positions than the south, which was blocked by Aveluy Wood and it was believed that more damage had been done opposite the 36th (Ulster) Division, the wire being cut well north of Thiepval and reasonably well at the Leipzig Redoubt. Assembly trenches were dug just before the attack, which tired out many of the troops due to attack.

=== British plan ===
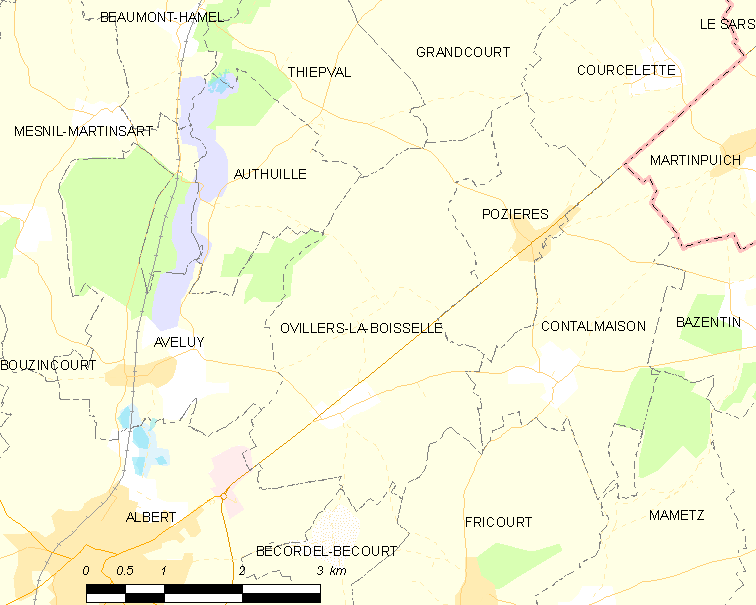
Map showing the area of the III Corps–X Corps boundary (commune FR insee code 80615)

The X Corps area ran north for 2,500 yd (1.4 mi; 2.3 km), from the III Corps boundary at Authuille Wood in the middle of Nab Valley, along the lower slope of the Thiepval Spur east of the Ancre river to Hamel, where the line crossed to the west bank and over Auchonvillers Spur for another 1,000 yd (910 m), to the boundary with VIII Corps. The corps plan was to capture the Thiepval Spur in one attack, which would obtain positions from which the German front would be overlooked as far as Serre north of the Ancre and Pozières and Contalmaison to the south. Both divisions practised on trenches built to resemble the German defences, in which the 32nd Division was to attack on the right of the corps area, from the Leipzig Salient to Thiepval village. Just before the last bombardment began at 7:00 a.m., a cloud gas attack was to begin from cylinders put in no man's land the night before. The division was to assemble low on the Thiepval Spur from Authuille to Thiepval woods, with a section of a field company attached to each brigade. The 97th Brigade and 96th Brigade were to attack the west face of the spur from the Leipzig Salient to Thiepval and then advance across Nab Valley. The southern face of Leipzig Salient was not to be attacked, since it was anticipated that it would be outflanked by the advance to the north.

The 97th Brigade (Brigadier-General John Jardine) was to attack on an 800 yd (730 m) front, with the right flank to attack the Leipzig Salient with the 17th and 16th battalions, Highland Light Infantry (HLI) leading and the 2nd Battalion, King's Own Yorkshire Light Infantry (2nd KOYLI) in support. The forward companies of the 17th HLI were to advance from the British front line at 7:23 a.m. until 30–40 yd (27–37 m) from the German front trench, ready to rush the trench as soon as the artillery lifted. (Note: Jardine had been an observer with the Japanese Army during the Russo-Japanese War (8 February 1904 – 5 September 1905) and noted that Japanese infantry pushed well up to the bombardment before an attack.) As soon as the redoubt was captured, the 11th Battalion, Border Regiment would advance against the southern face from Authuille Wood and mop up the defences, after which all the 97th Brigade would advance towards Mouquet Farm. When the Wonderwork, village and Schwaben Redoubt had been captured, both divisions were to advance on the German intermediate position across the spur and summit of Bazentin Ridge, to the Mouquet Switch in the 32nd Division sector. When this position had been captured and consolidated, the reserve brigades of both divisions would pass through and attack the second position (Mouquet Farm–Grandcourt Line) at 10:10 a.m., 160 minutes after zero hour.

== Battle ==
=== 1 July ===
==== 97th Brigade ====
Weather 1–23 July 1916
Date	Rain mm	°F	
1	0.0	75–54	hazy
2	0.0	75–54	fine
3	2.0	68–55	fine
4	17.0	70–55	rain
5	0.0	72–52	dull
6	2.0	70–54	rain
7	13.0	70–59	rain
8	8.0	73–52	rain
9	0.0	70–53	dull
10	0.0	82–48	dull
11	0.0	68–52	dull
12	0.1	68–?	dull
13	0.1	70–54	dull
14	0.0	70–?	dull
15	0.0	72–47	fine
16	4.0	73–55	dull
17	0.0	70–59	mist
18	0.0	72–52	dull
19	0.0	70–50	dull
20	0.0	75–52	fine
21	0.0	72–52	fine
22	0.1	77–55	dull
23	0.0	68–54	dull

The forward companies of the 17th HLI advanced at 7:23 a.m. until they were 30–40 yd (27–37 m) from the German front trench. When the bombardment lifted at 7:30 a.m. the Highlanders rushed the Leipzig Salient and captured the redoubt at the head of the salient. The German garrison was caught under cover in the quarry, which covered an area of 60 yd × 40 yd (55 m × 37 m) around which the redoubt had been built and taken prisoner. The 17th HLI pressed on to Hindenburg Trench about 150 yd (140 m) further on but the machine-gunners in the Wonderwork caught them in the open, inflicted many casualties and repulsed the attack. The commander of the 161st Brigade Royal Field Artillery (RFA) could see that the infantry advance had been halted that the barrage was moving into the German defences and that no troops from the III Corps on the right or the 32nd Division were following it. Jardine ordered two batteries to be taken out of the planned bombardment and switched to the defences behind Leipzig Redoubt, despite orders forbidding local discretion and the survivors of the 17th HLI were able to retire to the redoubt.

Infantry Regiment 180, which held the Leipzig Salient and the ground as far south as the Albert–Bapaume road, had 284 casualties during the preparatory bombardment and on the right flank, the 3rd Company reported that British troops had got into sectors C8 and C9 in the Reserve Infantry Regiment 99 area just to the north. Sector P1 was at risk of envelopment but a frontal attack was repulsed and the 7th Company arrived to reinforce. The trenches leading north were blocked but British attacks continued and both infantry regiments arranged a counter-attack for 1:45 p.m. Bombers attacked from north and south and by 4:10 p.m. had recaptured most of Sector P1 and met in Hindenburg Trench. The British hold on Granatloch (Leipzig Redoubt) was maintained and the Germans blamed a lack of hand grenades for the failure to complete the recapture of the salient.

Jardine ordered two batteries to be taken out of the planned bombardment and switched to the defences behind Leipzig Redoubt, despite orders forbidding local discretion, with this support the survivors of the 17th HLI were able to retire to the redoubt. The right flank companies of the 2nd KOYLI arrived at the redoubt and joined in the consolidation but attempts to renew the advance up the slope were costly failures. Bombing attacks up the trenches on the flanks of the redoubt towards Hindenburg Trench and Lemberg Trench, also failed. At 8:30 a.m. the 11th Border advanced from Authuille Wood on schedule, under the impression that the advance had gone well, due to the view being obscured by smoke and dust and was immediately engaged by the machine-gunners in the Nordwerk to the south. The battalion pressed on despite devastating casualties and small groups on the left flank got into the redoubt and linked with the 17th HLI but most of the survivors were pinned down in no man's land and rallied in Authuille Wood later in the day.

On the left flank of the brigade, the 16th HLI and the left flank companies of the 2nd KOYLI due to capture the Wonderwork were not able to get into the German front trench, which had not been severely damaged by the preliminary bombardment and where the wire was uncut. As the 16th HLI had crept forward before the lift of the bombardment, machine-gun fire had begun from the trenches and the château. The men rose to charge when the bombardment lifted and a great volume of machine-gun fire met them, from emplacements which were invisible to the artillery observers watching the attack. The infantry were stopped at the wire and found that every gap was covered by a machine-gun. (Note: A raid before the attack had been shot down at the German wire by machine-guns trained on the gaps. Two parties of Royal Engineers equipped with Bangalore torpedoes, were attached to the leading companies to cut more gaps during the main attack but were annihilated in no man's land.) A few parties on the right flank managed to reach the Leipzig Redoubt but in the centre and on the left flank, the survivors were pinned down in no man's land and swept by machine-gun fire at any sign of movement.

==== 96th Brigade ====
The 16th Battalion, Northumberland Fusiliers (16th Northumberland) and the 15th Battalion, Lancashire Fusiliers (15th Lancashire) leading the 96th Brigade attack, were shot down immediately the attack began by the machine-gunners in Thiepval. The 16th Lancashire in support moved forward to the vacant front trenches as the attack began and the 2nd Royal Inniskilling Fusiliers (2nd Inniskilling) were in reserve in the valley. The 16th Northumberland attacked towards the south and centre of Thiepval but hardly advanced from the front line, before lines of troops were mown down and attempts to get forward by short rushes were also checked by continuous machine-gun fire. The effect of the German machine-guns, gave the German infantry time to emerge from shelter and some climbed onto the trench parapet to get a better view of the attackers and engage them with rifle fire. The last company of the 16th Northumberland mounted the fire step of the British front trench to return fire against the German soldiers visible opposite.

On the left flank, the 15th Lancashire were also swept by machine-gun fire from Thiepval but about 100 men of the leading companies got into the German front line, while the garrison was still underground and charged into the village. The Germans were able to emerge from shelter and occupy the front trench, cutting off the fusiliers and stopping the troops further back from entering the trench. The party in the village managed to reach 36th (Ulster) Division troops, who had broken through the German line north of Thiepval. The troops in the village were seen by Royal Flying Corps (RFC) aircrew on contact patrol, who reported the sightings to the X Corps headquarters throughout the day. Air reports were confirmed by the 32nd Division headquarters and led to it being assumed that the east end of the village had been captured; no more artillery fire was directed at the village. At 10:30 a.m., Major-General William Rycroft, the 32nd Division commander, sent orders for the attacking brigades to hold fast, while an attempt to outflank Thiepval from the north was organised.

At 9:10 a.m., Rycroft sent orders for the 96th Brigade opposite Thiepval to send the 2nd Inniskillings forward along the left flank, to reinforce the 15th Lancashire, who were reported to have broken through into the village. Brigadier-General Clement Yatman, the 96th Brigade commander, had assembled half of the 16th Lancashire at Johnson's Post, in the eastern fringe of Thiepval Wood and ordered them forward to the north end of Thiepval to join the 15th Lancashire and rendezvous with the 36th (Ulster) Division at the Crucifix, south of Schwaben Redoubt. As soon as the advance began at 9:15 a.m., the machine-gunners in Thiepval swept them with bullets. After several attempts to advance across no man's land, the attempt was suspended and Rycroft informed of the failure. On the right of the 32nd Division, the 14th Brigade (Brigadier-General Charles Compton), held in reserve to pass through the 97th and 96th brigades to the German intermediate position, had moved forward on schedule from Aveluy and Authuille to Authuille Wood.

==== 14th Brigade ====
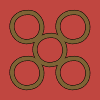
Insignia (four eights) of the 32nd Division

Dust and smoke over the battlefield and intermittent reports from artillery and contact patrol observers, had led to the commanders in the 32nd Division at first gaining the impression that the initial attack had gone well. The 14th Brigade moved forward in two columns from shelters and at 8:45 a.m. the 1st Battalion, Dorset Regiment in the lead of the left-hand column advanced in artillery formation behind a screen of skirmishers. As the battalion debouched from Authuille Wood, machine-gunners in the Nordwerk opened fire and only 66 men reached Leipzig Redoubt. The two following companies were pinned down in the wood and the British front line. The commander of the 19th Lancashire behind the 1st Dorset, had a smoke screen made by the brigade 4-inch Stokes mortars to cover the right flank and then sent forward three companies to the Leipzig Redoubt. The companies advanced in waves of 30–40 men but were shot down despite the smoke; only 42 men made it across. Word was sent back from the redoubt not to send more troops forward, as the area was overcrowded. Two Russian saps dug before the attack were opened and secure contact established with the redoubt. The right-hand column saw the fate of the leading column and was held back in Authuille Wood.

At 11:40 a.m. Rycroft contacted Lieutenant-General Thomas Morland, the corps commander, to report on the situation and suggested that another attempt be made to skirt round the north side of Thiepval and then work south to get behind it, the defences further down the Thiepval Spur and the Wonderwork to cut Zollern Graben and the other communication trenches leading back to Courcellete, 3 mi (4.8 km) east. Rycroft applied for reinforcements from the 49th (West Riding) Division to follow the 2nd Inniskilling, which was preparing to advance. The 14th Brigade would reinforce the Leipzig Redoubt and attack Hindenburg and Lemberg trenches from the south and west, as the northern flanking move began. Morland agreed and the corps heavy howitzers were ordered to bombard the far side of the Thiepval Spur, the Wonderwork, the Nab Valley trenches and the Nordwerk from 12:05 a.m.–1:30 p.m. A bombardment on the west side of Thiepval and the château was not fired, as the 15th Lancashire were still thought to be in the village.

The bombardment was spread over too wide an area to be effective and had no effect on the Germans on the Thiepval Spur. Half of the 2nd Inniskilling and parties of the 96th Brigade advanced at 1:30 p.m. from Thiepval Wood and were at once engaged with machine-gun fire and repulsed. On the right flank in the 14th Brigade area, half of the 2nd Battalion, Manchester Regiment advanced from Authuille Wood along communication trenches and then moved forward on the left, through the other half of the battalion, on ground not commanded by the machine-guns in the Nordwerk. By 1:45 p.m., the two companies had reached Leipzig Redoubt with little loss but attempts to bomb forward to Hindenburg and Lemberg trenches, were defeated by German bombers who had blocked the trenches. So many British troops packed the trenches that it was difficult to move and a stalemate ensued. By nightfall only the Leipzig Redoubt was still held by the 32nd Division and engineers moved forward to consolidate.

The 2nd Manchester of the 14th Brigade and two companies of the 2nd KOYLI from the 97th Brigade took over from the 17th HLI and the remnants of the 16th HLI which were withdrawn. German counter-attacks against the flanks of the redoubt were repulsed and the collection of wounded from no man's land began, helped by gunners and engineers who used blankets to carry casualties but took until 3 July. Once the wounded had reached divisional dressing stations the facilities proved sufficient but the transport of supplies and water to the front line, was slowed by traffic jams. Most of the water pipes installed before the offensive were cut by artillery fire and the Germans moved forward a gun on the Grandcourt–Beaucourt rail line at night, to fire along the Ancre valley, which further slowed the delivery of supplies.

=== Air operations ===
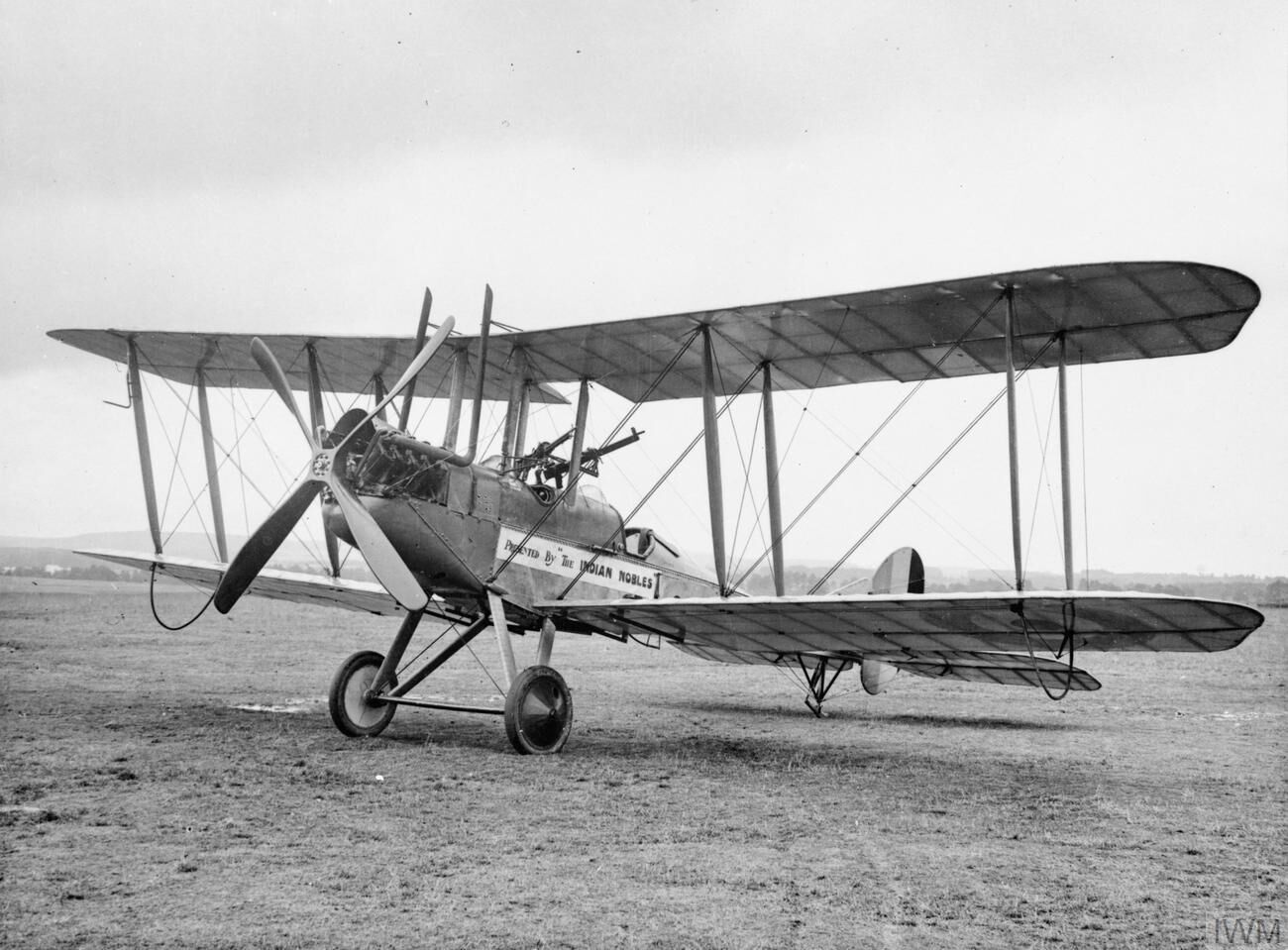
Example of a B.E.2c, similar to those of 4 Squadron RFC

X Corps operations were supported by 4 Squadron RFC, which could observe the deeper advances made by isolated parties of British troops. A special reconnaissance of Thiepval from 600 ft (180 m) was made during the afternoon but the failure of the attacks on the village made the penetrations north of the Leipzig Redoubt untenable.

=== 2–22 July ===
==== 2–3 July ====
By the morning of 2 July, X Corps had gained a foothold in the Leipzig Salient and part of the German front line opposite the 36th (Ulster) Division. The extent of British casualties north of the Albert–Bapaume road was not known at the Fourth Army headquarters and General Henry Rawlinson ordered that attacks were to continue. X Corps and VIII Corps to the north, were to capture the German front position and the intermediate line from Mouquet Farm to Serre. Gough was sent to take over command of X Corps and VIII Corps and the 25th Division (Major-General Guy Bainbridge) was transferred from reserve to X Corps. Gough had intended to attack Thiepval with the 49th (West Riding) and 32nd divisions and the 48th (South Midland) Division of VIII Corps but eventually changes of plan, led to the attack being reduced to two brigades of the 32nd Division.

The objectives for the division were set on an 800 yd (730 m) line, from the east end of the Leipzig Redoubt to the Wonderwork. The 14th Brigade had taken over from the 97th Brigade at the redoubt and the 75th Brigade attached from the 25th Division. The 75th Brigade had arrived from reserve at 3:30 p.m. on 2 July. The change of plan and an increase in the 32nd Division attack frontage to 1,400 yd (1,300 m) to include Thiepval Château did not reach Rycroft until 10:45 p.m. Twenty minutes before the attack began at 3:15 a.m., Gough called to report that X Corps could not attack until 6:00 a.m. but would co-operate by forming a smoke screen and using half of the corps artillery ammunition to support the III Corps to the south. Communication failures due to German artillery-fire cutting telephone cables, caused most of the 32nd Division artillery to begin the planned barrage, firing half its ammunition on the original frontage and then the remaining ammunition on the wider attack front of the revised plan.

The 14th Brigade attack was conducted by two companies of the 15th HLI, which attacked from the Leipzig Salient after defeating several German counter-attacks. The Highlanders got into the German front trench at 6:15 a.m. but were then pushed out and a second attempt was also repulsed. The 75th Brigade attack by three battalions on the northern flank, met uncut wire on the flanks and the leading waves were cut down by machine-gun fire or overwhelmed in the German trenches. About 60 men of the 11th Battalion, Cheshire Regiment made their way to the Leipzig Redoubt. I Battalion, Reserve Infantry Regiment 99 was reinforced during the attack by a company of Bavarian Reserve Infantry Regiment 8 of the 10th Bavarian Division. The attack was abandoned and the survivors pinned down in no man's land were brought back. During the night of 3/4 July the remainder of the 32nd Division was relieved by the 25th Division.

==== 4–22 July ====
The Reserve Army was ordered to return to trench warfare and X Corps to push forward from its footholds in the German front line. On 4 July, German artillery-fire fell on the X Corps area, followed by bombing attacks on the 25th Division in the Leipzig Salient and against the 49th (West Riding) Division further north which failed, as did raids during the night by the 49th (West Riding) Division. At 7:00 p.m. on 5 July, the 25th Division attacked on a 500 yd (460 m) front at the Leipzig Salient; the 1st Battalion Wiltshire Regiment of the 7th Brigade got a foothold in Hindenburg Trench, then repulsed a determined counter-attack. Early on 7 July a German attack by two companies of the 3rd Guard Division a company of Infantry Regiment 185 and four more attacked the 49th (West Riding) Division positions north of Thiepval, recaptured the last positions taken by the 36th (Ulster) Division on 1 July.

At 1:15 a.m. on 7 July, the Germans tried to rush the Leipzig Redoubt from the front and both flanks. The attack was defeated by the 1st Wiltshire and was then followed by German bombing attacks until 5:30 a.m. An attack by two companies of the 1st Wiltshire planned earlier, went ahead despite the confusion and captured the German front line, with help from snipers who moved forward in the dark and used steel-nosed bullets to engage German machine-guns. The ground was then held with help from the 3rd Battalion Worcestershire Regiment and a company of the 8th Battalion, Loyal North Lancashire, against German counter-attacks and artillery-fire. The main effort of X Corps was made south of the Leipzig Salient against Ovillers for the next few days. On the night of 7/8 July, the 49th (West Riding) Division had extended its sector south and taken over Leipzig Redoubt from the 25th Division, which concentrated against Ovillers. During the Battle of Bazentin Ridge (14–17 July) The Reserve Army continued operations to prevent German troops opposite from being moved south, against the Fourth Army.

On 9/10 July, the 11th Cheshire, 3rd Worcester and the 8th North Lancashire attacked and managed to capture a small amount of ground. The Leipzig Salient, was bombarded by German artillery with gas and lachrymatory shells on 15 July, followed by an attack at dawn by Infantry Regiment 185 of Division Burckhardt, accompanied by bombers and flame-thrower crews, which made little progress and was costly for both sides. On 21 July, another bombing attack was made by the Germans. For a combined attack by the French Sixth and the British Fourth armies, planned for the night of 22/23 July, the Reserve Army contributed attacks towards Pozières and the 49th (West Riding) Division attacked the Leipzig Salient on 22 July. The 4th York and Lancaster, attempted a surprise attack and was repulsed. At 2:15 a.m. on 23 July, the 4th KOYLI attacked but was not able to consolidate its gains, before being forced back by a counter-attack from both flanks and the centre.

== Aftermath ==
=== Analysis ===
In 1932, James Edmonds, the British official historian, wrote that III Corps had neglected the south side of Nab Valley, which made the neglect of the north side by X Corps worse, because the trenches in the Nab Valley re-entrant faced a large area of no man's land, from which enfilade machine-gun fire began as soon as the attack commenced. Edmonds wrote that it had been an unfortunate mistake to put the inter-corps boundary along such a valley. Reserve Infantry Regiment 99 reported that their defensive success on 1 July was mainly due to machine-guns, all of which were operational when the attack began. The 3rd Company of Infantry Regiment 180, in Leipzig Redoubt, was annihilated in hand-to-hand fighting but the garrison of Thiepval, further to the north, was protected by the shelters beneath the village. Reinforcements were only needed against the 36th (Ulster) Division to the north.

In the rest of the Infantry Regiment 180 sector, the German positions were intact at the end of 1 July. In 2005, Prior and Wilson wrote that German prisoners were abused by men of the 2nd Manchester, who made the captives run through German artillery-fire and prevented them, at bayonet point, from entering trenches. Prior and Wilson also wrote that the Germans managed to inflict many casualties on the British behind the British front line, particularly from positions dominating the exits of Authuille Wood. The 32nd Division attack had failed everywhere except at the Leipzig Redoubt, because the British artillery had not destroyed the German strong points or many German guns. The capture of the redoubt was contained and most attempts to reinforce by the British were costly failures.

=== Casualties ===
The 32nd Division suffered 3,949 casualties on 1 July. Infantry Regiment 180 suffered 273 casualties at the Leipzig Salient and Nab Valley to the south, inflicting about 5,000 casualties on the 32nd Division and the 8th Division, which attacked Ovillers. In the attack on 3 July, the 75th Brigade suffered 1,100 casualties. On 7 July, the 1st Wiltshire suffered about 426 casualties and the 3rd Worcester, 145.

=== Subsequent operations ===
Operations around the Leipzig Redoubt continued during the Battle of Pozières (23 July – 3 September) and concluded in late September in the Battle of Thiepval Ridge (26–28 September).
