= Juliette Morillot =

French journalist (born 1959)

- Born: 1959 (age 66–67); Bar-le-Duc, France
- Education: École du Louvre; Institut national des langues et civilisations orientales
- Occupation: Journalist

Juliette Morillot (pronounced [ʒyljɛt mɔʁijo]; born 1959) is a French journalist. She is the author of several books about North Korea.

== Early life ==
Morillot was born in 1959 in Bar-le-Duc, France. Her parents were English teachers.

Morillot graduated from the École du Louvre, where she earned a master's degree in museology. She learned Czech, Korean, Japanese and Russian at the Institut national des langues et civilisations orientales.

== Career ==
Morillot taught at the University of Seoul in 1988. She has taught at the École de guerre.

Morillot was a contributing writer to Jeune Afrique from 2005 to 2015. She became the editor of La Revue in 2012, followed by Asialyst.

Morillot is the author of several books. She was awarded the Prix du meilleur livre de géopolitique 2018 from the Grenoble Geopolitics Festival for La Corée du Nord en 100 questions in 2018.

== Selected works ==
- Morillot, Juliette (1988). Tout sur ... la Corée, le pays du matin clair. Paris: Souffles. ISBN 9782876580220. OCLC 63132553.
- Morillot, Juliette (1998). La Corée, montagnes, chamanes et gratte-ciel,. Paris: Autrement. ISBN 9782862607825. OCLC 39294742.
- Morillot, Juliette; Vérin, Marc (2003). La Corée : Terre des Esprits. Paris: Hermé. ISBN 9782866653750. OCLC 53229823.
- Malovic, Dorian; Morillot, Juliette (2004). Evadés de Corée du Nord : Témoignages. Paris: Belfond. ISBN 9782714440570. OCLC 718010942.
- Morillot, Juliette (2010). Les Larmes Bleues. Paris: Pocket. ISBN 9782266197281. OCLC 763061529.
- Morillot, Juliette (2012). Les Sacrifiés. Paris: Belfond. ISBN 9782298056358. OCLC 1040430788.
- Malovic, Dorian; Morillot, Juliette (2018). La Corée du Nord en 100 questions. Paris: Tallandier. ISBN 9791021031449. OCLC 1021886451.
- Malovic, Dorian; Morillot, Juliette (2018). Le Monde selon Kim Jong-un. Paris: Robert Laffont. ISBN 9782221216675. OCLC 1023610327.
