= Authuille =

- Commune
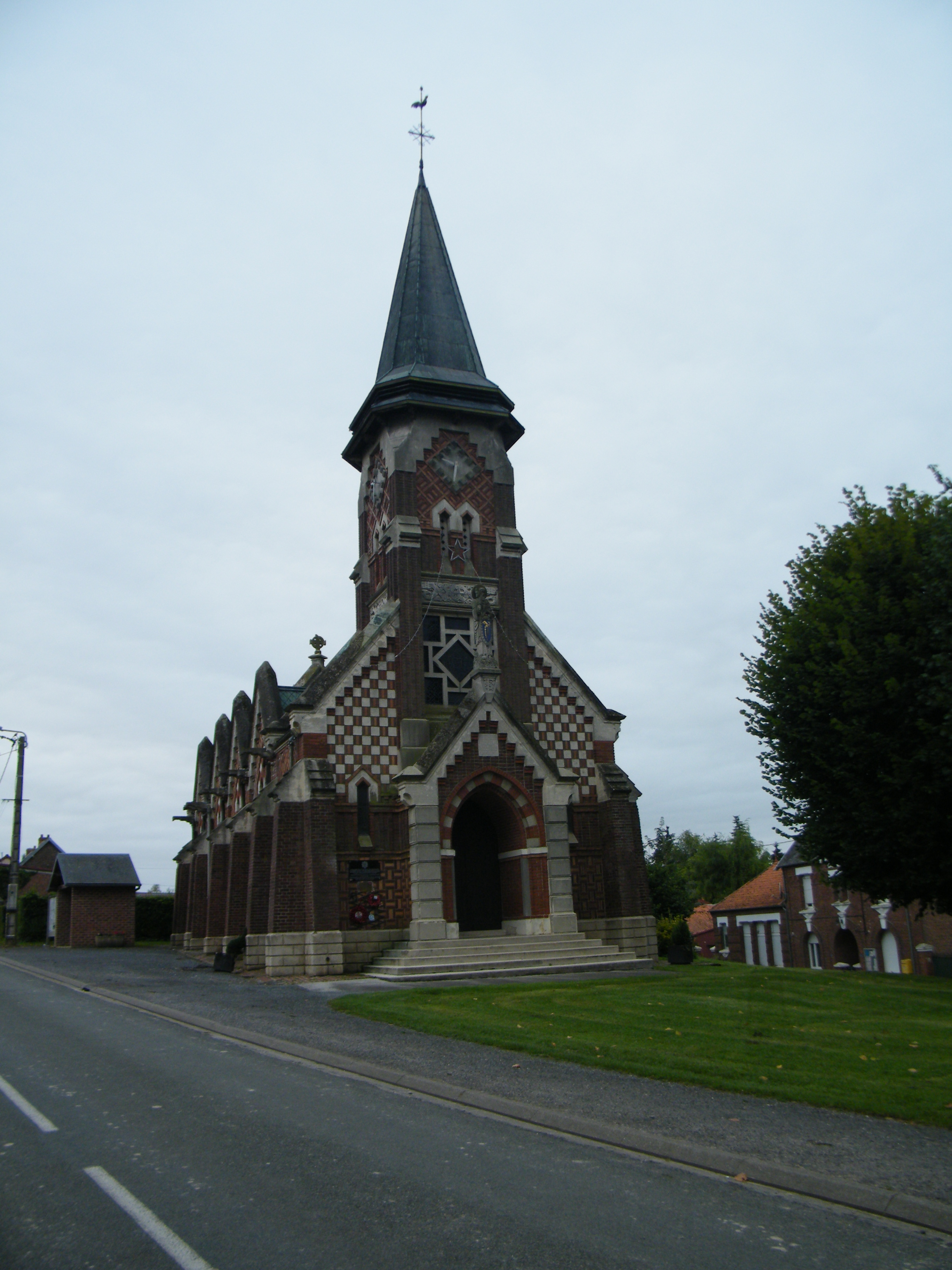
- The church of Saint-Fursy
- Location of Authuille
- Location within France Location within Hauts-de-France
- Coordinates: 50°02′37″N 2°40′09″E
- Country: France
- Region: Hauts-de-France
- Department: Somme
- Arrondissement: Péronne
- Canton: Albert
- Intercommunality: CC Pays Coquelicot

Government
  - Mayor (2020–2026): Fabrice Colson
- Area^{1}: 3.58 km^{2} (1.38 sq mi)
- Elevation: 76 m (249 ft)
- Highest elevation: 143 m (469 ft)
- Lowest elevation: 65 m (213 ft)
- Population (2023): 154
  - Density: 43.0/km^{2} (111/sq mi)
- Time zone: UTC+01:00 (CET)
  - Summer (DST): UTC+02:00 (CEST)
- INSEE/Postal code: 80045 /80300
- ^{1} French Land Register data, which excludes lakes, ponds, glaciers > 1 km^{2} (0.386 sq mi or 247 acres) and river estuaries.

Authuille (French pronunciation: [otɥij]) is a commune in the Somme department in Hauts-de-France in northern France.

== See also ==
- Communes of the Somme department
