= Saint-Lumier-la-Populeuse =

- Commune
- Coat of arms
- Location of Saint-Lumier-la-Populeuse
- Location within France Location within Grand Est
- Coordinates: 48°43′34″N 4°47′39″E
- Country: France
- Region: Grand Est
- Department: Marne
- Arrondissement: Vitry-le-François
- Canton: Sermaize-les-Bains

Government
  - Mayor (2024–2026): Gérard Gavel
- Area^{1}: 2.38 km^{2} (0.92 sq mi)
- Elevation: 132 m (433 ft)
- Population (2023): 41
  - Density: 17/km^{2} (45/sq mi)
- Time zone: UTC+01:00 (CET)
  - Summer (DST): UTC+02:00 (CEST)
- INSEE/Postal code: 51497 /51340
- ^{1} French Land Register data, which excludes lakes, ponds, glaciers > 1 km^{2} (0.386 sq mi or 247 acres) and river estuaries.

Saint-Lumier-la-Populeuse (French pronunciation: [sɛ̃ lymje la pɔpyløz]) is a commune in the Marne department in north-eastern France.

== See also ==
- Communes of the Marne department
