= Gerald Merrithew =

Canadian politician

The Honourable Gerald Merrithew PC CD

Minister of Veterans Affairs
- In office 15 September 1988 – 4 January 1993
- Prime Minister: Brian Mulroney
- Preceded by: George Hees
- Succeeded by: Kim Campbell

Minister of State (Forestry and Mines)
- In office 30 June 1986 – 14 September 1988
- Prime Minister: Brian Mulroney
- Minister: Marcel Masse
- Preceded by: Himself (as Minister of State (Forestry)); Robert Layton (as Minister of State (Mines))
- Succeeded by: Gerry St. Germain

Minister of State (Forestry)
- In office 17 September 1984 – 29 June 1986
- Prime Minister: Brian Mulroney
- Minister: John Wise
- Preceded by: Position established
- Succeeded by: Himself (as Minister of State (Forestry and Mines))
New Brunswick Executive Council
Minister of Natural Resources Government House Leader
In office 30 October 1982 – 3 August 1984
Premier	Richard Hatfield
Preceded by	Edwin G. Allen
Succeeded by	Malcolm MacLeod
Minister of Commerce and Development
In office 20 December 1976 – 30 October 1982
Premier	Richard Hatfield
Preceded by	Lawrence Garvie (Economic Growth)
Succeeded by	Paul Dawson
Minister of Education
In office 3 December 1974 – 20 December 1976
Premier	Richard Hatfield
Preceded by	J. Lorne McGuigan
Succeeded by	Charles Gallagher
Parliamentary constituencies
Member of Parliament for Saint John
In office 4 September 1984 – 25 October 1993
Preceded by	Mike Landers
Succeeded by	Elsie Wayne
Member of the New Brunswick Legislative Assembly for East Saint John (Saint John East; 1972–1974)
In office 11 December 1972 – July 1984
Preceded by	Multi-member district
Succeeded by	Peter Trites

Personal details
- Born: Gerald Stairs Merrithew; 23 September 1931 Saint John, New Brunswick, Canada
- Died: 5 September 2004 (aged 72)
- Party: Progressive Conservative
- Spouse: Gloria McLean
- Profession: Secondary school Principal

Gerald Stairs "Gerry" Merrithew PC CD (23 September 1931 – 5 September 2004), born in Saint John, New Brunswick, Canada, was an educator, provincial and federal politician, and statesman.

Merrithew graduated from the New Brunswick Teachers' College, then obtained his BA and B.Ed degrees from the University of New Brunswick.

With a lifelong interest in the Canadian Forces, he became an officer cadet and rose to the rank of lieutenant-colonel. As a high school principal, he was active not only in the educational field, but the military, recreational fields, as well as cultural affairs that led to his entering politics.

== Provincial politics ==
First elected to the Saint John City Council in 1971 he went into provincial politics in 1972, winning a by-election for the Provincial Progressive Conservative Party. Re-elected to the Legislative Assembly in 1974, he would be appointed to the Cabinet as Minister of Education then in 1976, Minister of Commerce & Development. After winning re-election again in 1978 and in 1982, he became the Minister of Natural Resources, Government House Leader, and Deputy Premier.

== Federal politics ==
Gerald Merrithew resigned his provincial seat to run as a Progressive Conservative Party of Canada candidate for the Saint John riding in the 1984 Canadian federal election. Elected to the House of Commons of Canada in Ottawa, and with his party winning the election, Merrithew was immediately appointed Minister of State for Forestry then in 1986 to Forestry & Mines. After winning his seventh consecutive election in 1988, he was appointed Minister for the purpose of the Atlantic Canada Opportunities Agency and Minister of Veterans Affairs.

== Retirement ==
In 1993, Merrithew resigned from Cabinet and did not seek re-election. He and his wife retired to their farm in Springfield, New Brunswick at the head of the Belleisle Bay.

Active with numerous Military and Veterans Associations, Merrithew was a member of the Queen's Privy Council for Canada and also held several directorships including the "26th Battalion Overseas Association Inc." where in 1995 he was instrumental in publishing the history of the Battalion by S. Douglas MacGowan (ISBN 1896270026).

== Death ==
Gerald Merrithew died of cancer on 5 September 2004, aged 72.

== Electoral history ==
1988 Canadian federal election: Saint John—Rothesay
Party	Candidate	Votes	%	±%
Progressive Conservative	Gerry Merrithew	16,798	43.1	-9.1
Liberal	Joe Boyce	15,067	38.6	+13.1
New Democratic	Judith Meinert	4,883	12.5	-8.7
Confederation of Regions	Jim Webb	1,806	4.6	+4.6
Libertarian	Thomas Gamblin	289	0.7	-0.1
Independent	Gary Zatzman	162	0.4	+0.4
Total valid votes		39,005	100.0	

1984 Canadian federal election: Saint John—Rothesay
Party	Candidate	Votes	%	±%
Progressive Conservative	Gerry Merrithew	16,604	52.2	+13.2
Liberal	Cliff Warner	8,109	25.5	-15.9
New Democratic	Mary Palmer	6,752	21.2	+2.3
Libertarian	Peter Jones	242	0.8	+0.6
Social Credit	Gordon Simons	102	0.3	+0.3
Total valid votes		31,809	100.0	

24th Canadian Ministry (1984–1993) – Cabinet of Brian Mulroney
Cabinet posts (3)
Predecessor	Office	Successor
George Hees	Minister of Veterans Affairs; 1988–1993	Kim Campbell
himself	Minister of State for Forestry & Mines; 1986–1988; Mines was part of the Ministry of Energy, Mines and Resources	Marcel Masse
John Wise	Minister of State for Forestry; 1984–1986; Part of the Ministry of Agriculture	Himself
New Brunswick provincial government of Richard Hatfield
Cabinet posts (3)
Predecessor	Office	Successor
Edwin G. Allen	Minister of Natural Resources; 1982–1984	Malcolm MacLeod
Lawrence Garvie	Minister of Commerce & Development; 1976–1982	Paul Dawson
Lorne McGuigan	Minister of Education; 1974–1976	Charles Gallagher
Special Cabinet Responsibilities
Predecessor	Title	Successor
	Deputy Premier; 1982–1984	
	Government House Leader; 1982–1984	
