= Charles R. Wasson =

Canadian politician

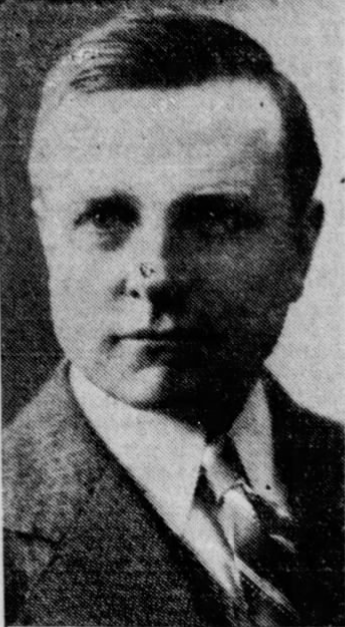

53rd Mayor of Saint John, New Brunswick
- In office November 4, 1940 – November 6, 1944
- Preceded by: David Laurence MacLaren
- Succeeded by: James D. McKenna

Personal details
- Born: Charles Robert Wasson; December 26, 1885; Saint John, New Brunswick
- Died: August 27, 1967 (aged 81); Saint John, New Brunswick

Charles Robert Wasson (December 26, 1885 – August 27, 1967) was a Canadian businessman and municipal politician who served as the mayor of Saint John, New Brunswick from 1940 to 1944.

== Life and career ==
Charles Robert Wasson was born on December 26, 1885, in Saint John, New Brunswick, to parents John Hollie Wasson and Annie B. Smith. During his childhood, Wasson sold newspapers for various provincial papers. He received education in Saint John, and began working as a pharmaceutical businessman based out of a King Street store. He passed pharmaceutical exams at the age of 17, and was running the store by the age of 21. In 1927, he was elected president of the New Brunswick branch of the Retail Merchants' Association.

Wasson entered politics by running for mayor of Saint John for the October 21, 1940 civic election. Wasson, representing the Civic Improvement League along with his councilor candidates, swept the civic polls and were elected. He was sworn in as mayor on November 4, 1940. He made a bid for re-election in 1942, and returned to office as the only mayoral candidate. In 1944, he was elected president of the New Brunswick Union of Municipalities. Wasson sought candidacy in the 1944 civic election, this time as a member of the Saint John Common Council with James D. McKenna as the mayoral candidate. Wasson and every other candidates were elected by acclamation, with Wasson himself being succeeded by McKenna.

== Death ==
Wasson died at the Saint John General Hospital following an illness, at the age of 81. He was interred at Fernhill Cemetery.
