= H. R. McLellan =

Canadian politician

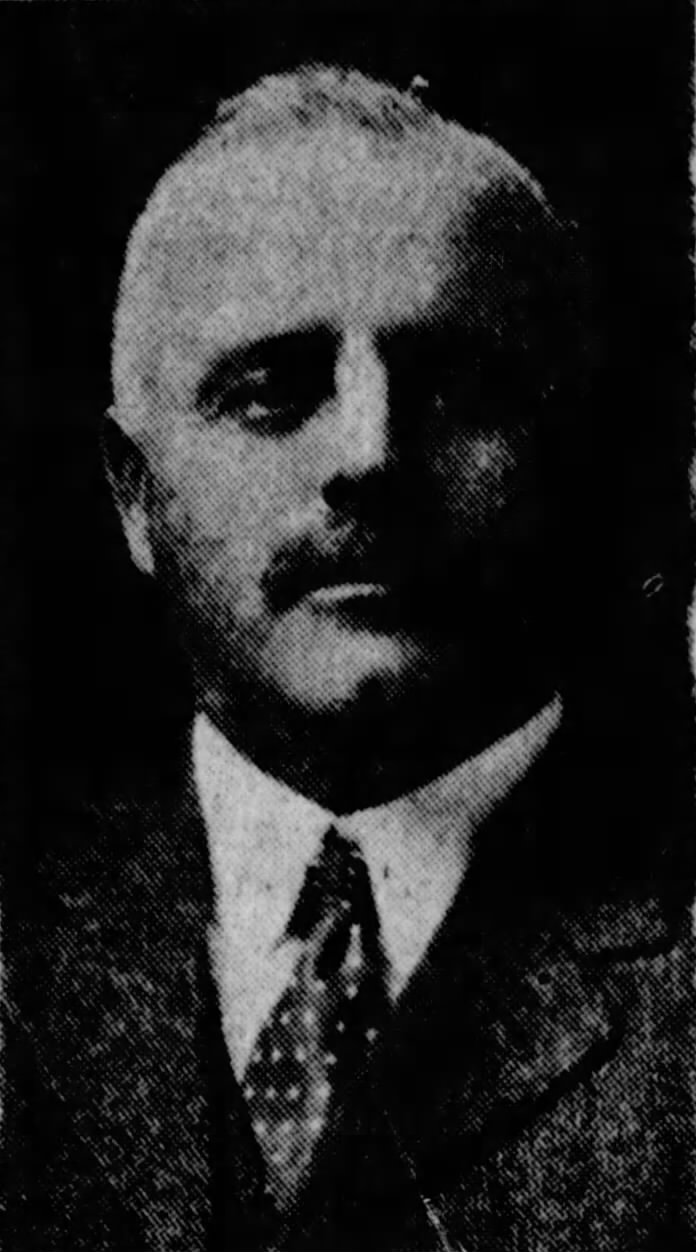

47th Mayor of Saint John, New Brunswick
- In office April 24, 1922 – November 13, 1922
- Preceded by: E. Allen Schofield
- Succeeded by: G. Fred Fisher

Personal details
- Born: Harry Richards McLellan; November 23, 1865 Saint John, New Brunswick, Canada
- Died: July 18, 1939 (aged 73) Saint John, New Brunswick, Canada
- Party: Liberal
- Spouse: Annie M. McLellan
- Parent: David McLellan (father)

Harry Richards McLellan (November 23, 1865 – July 18, 1939) was a Canadian promoter and politician who served as the mayor of Saint John, New Brunswick from April to November 1922.

== Life and career ==
Harry Richards McLellan was born on November 23, 1865, in Saint John, New Brunswick, to provincial politician David McLellan and his wife Fanny B. Richards. He attended public school in Saint John and graduated from Acadia University. McLellan worked as a businessman, working in the lumbering industry in Quebec, Labrador and in Ontario, after which he founded the H. R. McLellan Co, Ltd. in Saint John, working as a promoter.

McLellan was elected to the Saint John City Council in 1912 and again in 1916, and served as the county warden between 1916 and 1917. He ran alongside William Patrick Broderick for the federal Liberal party in the St. John—Albert riding during the 1921 federal election, where they both lost to Conservatives J. B. M. Baxter and Murray MacLaren. McLellan was elected as the Mayor of Saint John on April 24, 1922, beating E. Allen Schofield with 4,533 votes. Following petitions to recall his mayoral position in September due to disagreements on his handling of a civic hydro policy, a by-election was held on November 13, 1922. Upon losing the vote to G. Fred Fisher, McLellan was ousted from his position as Mayor.

== Death ==
McLellan died in his Saint John home on July 18, 1939, at the age of 73. He was buried in Fernhill Cemetery on July 21, 1939.
