= Thomas Miller Bell =

Canadian politician (1923–1996)

- Official 1973 portrait

Member of Parliament for St. John—Albert
- In office 1953–1968
- Preceded by: Daniel Riley
- Succeeded by: riding renamed

Member of Parliament for Saint John—Lancaster
- In office 1968–1974
- Preceded by: first member
- Succeeded by: Mike Landers

Personal details
- Born: January 11, 1923 Saint John, New Brunswick, Canada
- Died: November 12, 1996 (aged 73)
- Party: Progressive Conservative
- Profession: barrister lawyer

Thomas Miller Bell (January 11, 1923 – November 12, 1996) was a Canadian politician, lawyer and barrister. He was elected to the House of Commons of Canada as a Member of the Progressive Conservative Party to represent the riding of St. John—Albert in 1953. He became Parliamentary Assistant to the Minister of Trade and Commerce in 1957. This position was succeeded by Parliamentary Secretary to the Minister of Justice and Attorney General of Canada for which he served three terms. He became the Chief Opposition Whip in 1968 until 1973 followed by Opposition House Leader of the Progressive Conservatives. He was also a member of the Standing Joint Committee on the Parliamentary Restaurant for two terms. He was defeated in 1974, after serving two terms for Saint John—Lancaster.

Bell was born in Saint John, New Brunswick, Canada. Prior to his federal political experience, he served in the Merchant Navy during World War II. His grandfather, Thomas Bell, also was a Member of Parliament.

== Electoral history ==
1965 Canadian federal election: Saint John—Rothesay
Party	Candidate	Votes	%	±%
Progressive Conservative	Tom Bell	21,909	51.4	-0.3
Liberal	Arthur Whelly	15,609	36.6	-3.3
New Democratic	Eldon Richardson	5,081	11.9	+7.4
Total valid votes		42,599	100.0	

1963 Canadian federal election: Saint John—Rothesay
Party	Candidate	Votes	%	±%
Progressive Conservative	Tom Bell	21,584	51.7	-0.1
Liberal	Arthur Whelly	16,669	39.9	+1.4
New Democratic	John Simonds	1,869	4.5	-1.6
Social Credit	Paul Sherwood	1,606	3.8	+0.1
Total valid votes		41,728	100.0	

1962 Canadian federal election: Saint John—Rothesay
Party	Candidate	Votes	%	±%
Progressive Conservative	Tom Bell	22,586	51.8	-12.1
Liberal	George Urquhart	16,790	38.5	+5.6
New Democratic	Eldon Richardson	2,641	6.1	+2.8
Social Credit	Harvey Lainson	1,608	3.7	+3.7
Total valid votes		43,625	100.0	

1958 Canadian federal election: Saint John—Rothesay
Party	Candidate	Votes	%	±%
Progressive Conservative	Tom Bell	21,983	63.9	+10.3
Liberal	George McLeod	13,917	32.9	-13.5
Co-operative Commonwealth	Eldon Richardson	1,394	3.3	+3.3
Total valid votes		37,294	100.0	

1957 Canadian federal election: Saint John—Rothesay
Party	Candidate	Votes	%	±%
Progressive Conservative	Tom Bell	21,983	53.6	+4.1
Liberal	Daniel Riley	19,047	46.4	-1.7
Total valid votes		41,030	100.0	

1953 Canadian federal election: Saint John—Rothesay
Party	Candidate	Votes	%	±%
Progressive Conservative	Tom Bell	18,881	49.5	+4.8
Liberal	Daniel Riley	18,338	48.1	-0.8
Co-operative Commonwealth	Raymond McAfee	933	2.4	-4.0
Total valid votes		38,152	100.0	

1974 Canadian federal election: Saint John—Rothesay
Party	Candidate	Votes	%	±%
Liberal	Mike Landers	12,860	46.1	+3.9
Progressive Conservative	Tom Bell	11,419	41.0	-12.9
New Democratic	Eldon Richardson	3,457	12.4	+9.9
Marxist–Leninist	Jay Baxter	118	0.4	+0.4
Total valid votes		27,854	100.0	

1972 Canadian federal election: Saint John—Rothesay
Party	Candidate	Votes	%	±%
Progressive Conservative	Tom Bell	16,350	53.9	+0.9
Liberal	Arthur Gould	12,783	42.2	+1.2
New Democratic	Joseph Drummond	788	2.5	-2.6
Social Credit	Tom Enright	394	1.3	+1.3
Total valid votes		30,315	100.0	

1968 Canadian federal election: Saint John—Rothesay
Party	Candidate	Votes	%	±%
Progressive Conservative	Tom Bell	15,756	53.0	+1.6
Liberal	William Ryan	12,160	41.0	+4.4
New Democratic	Eldon Richardson	1,508	5.1	-6.8
Independent	Mildred Crawford	268	0.9	+0.9
Total valid votes		29,692	100.0	
