= Elsie Wayne =

Canadian politician

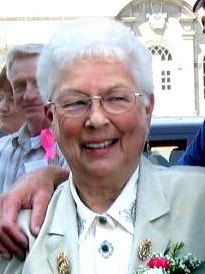
- Wayne in 2007

Member of Parliament for Saint John
- In office October 25, 1993 – June 28, 2004
- Preceded by: Gerald Merrithew
- Succeeded by: Paul Zed

Interim Leader of the Progressive Conservative Party of Canada
- In office April 2, 1998 – November 14, 1998
- Preceded by: Jean Charest
- Succeeded by: Joe Clark

72nd Mayor of Saint John, New Brunswick
- In office 1983–1993
- Preceded by: Bob Lockhart
- Succeeded by: Thomas J. Higgins

Personal details
- Born: Elsie Eleanore Fairweather; April 20, 1932 Shediac, New Brunswick, Canada
- Died: August 23, 2016 (aged 84) Saint John, New Brunswick, Canada
- Party: Conservative (2003–2016)
- Other political affiliations: Progressive Conservative (1993–2003)
- Profession: Businesswoman; activist; secretary

Elsie Eleanore Wayne (née Fairweather; April 20, 1932 – August 23, 2016) was a Canadian politician who served as a Progressive Conservative Member of Parliament for Saint John from 1993 to 2004. She was born in Shediac, New Brunswick.

== Political career ==
In 1977, she was elected to the Saint John municipal council. In 1983, she became the first female mayor of Saint John, and became extremely popular in the city.

In the 1993 federal election, she ran as the governing Progressive Conservative Party's candidate in the riding of Saint John-Rothesay. In this election, the Tories suffered the worst ever defeat for a governing party at the federal level in Canada. Wayne was one of only two Tories elected nationwide, the other being Jean Charest; Charest won his third term at Sherbrooke in 1993. She was also the only non-Liberal elected in Atlantic Canada that year. She was elected by 4,000 votes, but never faced another contest nearly that close.

In 1998, when Charest resigned the leadership of the PC party to become leader of the Quebec Liberal Party, Wayne was appointed the PC party's interim leader, a post she held until former Prime Minister Joe Clark was elected party leader later that year.

She supported the merger of the Progressive Conservatives (led by Peter MacKay) and the Canadian Alliance (led by Stephen Harper) in 2003.

Wayne announced her retirement from politics on February 16, 2004 and did not run for re-election in the 2004 election to the House of Commons of Canada.

== Political positions ==
Politically, she was known as being socially conservative, vehemently opposing same-sex marriage. She was also against abortion rights, decriminalization of marijuana, and Viagra for war veterans.

Fiscally, Wayne was a strong believer in Canada's social safety net and the welfare state, which was typical for most Tories from Atlantic Canada. She was also among Canada's most vocal monarchists.

== Later life and death ==
Wayne considered a run for her old seat in the 2006 election, but decided against a comeback. She did, however, serve as chairwoman of the Conservative campaign in Atlantic Canada.

She was married to Richard Wayne, with whom she had two sons, Daniel and Stephen. In November 2009, she suffered a stroke. She was released from hospital in February 2010. She died on August 23, 2016, at her home in Saint John.

== Electoral history ==
2000 Canadian federal election: Saint John—Rothesay
Party	Candidate	Votes	%	±%
Progressive Conservative	Elsie Wayne	16,751	50.9	-12.2
Liberal	Paul Zed	9,535	29.0	+13.1
New Democratic	Rod Hill	2,989	9.1	-1.3
Alliance	Peter Touchbourne	2,980	9.1	-0.7
Marijuana	Jim Wood	461	1.4	+1.4
Green	Vern Garnett	131	0.3	+0.3
Natural Law	Miville Couture	52	0.2	-0.5
Total valid votes		32,899	100.0	

1997 Canadian federal election: Saint John—Rothesay
Party	Candidate	Votes	%	±%
Progressive Conservative	Elsie Wayne	22,227	63.1	+19.8
Liberal	Diana Alexander	5,612	15.9	-17.7
New Democratic	Larry Hanley	3,679	10.4	+6.3
Reform	George Richardson	3,467	9.8	+3.6
Natural Law	Christopher B. Collrin	232	0.7	n/c
Total valid votes		35,217	100.0	

1993 Canadian federal election: Saint John—Rothesay
Party	Candidate	Votes	%	±%
Progressive Conservative	Elsie Wayne	15,123	43.3	+0.2
Liberal	Pat Landers	11,736	33.6	-5.0
Independent	Joe Boyce	3,685	10.6	+10.6
Reform	John Erbs	2,171	6.2	+6.2
New Democratic	Shirley Brown	1,443	4.1	-8.4
Canada Party	Jim Webb	368	1.1	+1.1
Natural Law	Christopher Collrin	252	0.7	+0.7
National	Joy Hobson	146	0.4	+0.4
Total valid votes		34,924	100.0	

Political offices
Preceded by Jean Charest	Leader of the Progressive Conservative Party; Interim; 1998	Succeeded by Joe Clark
