= Saint John—Kennebecasis =

Federal electoral district in New Brunswick, Canada

New Brunswick electoral district
- Interactive map of riding boundaries from the 2025 federal election
- Coordinates: 45.292°N 66.034°W

Federal electoral district
- Legislature: House of Commons
MP
Wayne Long
Liberal
- District created: 1914
- First contested: 1917
- Last contested: 2025
- District webpage: profile, map

Demographics
- Population (2021): 81,996
- Electors (2025): 64,243
- Area (km²): 457
- Pop. density (per km²): 179.4
- Census division(s): Kings, Saint John
- Census subdivision(s): Saint John (part), Quispamsis, Rothesay

Saint John—Kennebecasis (formerly Saint John—Rothesay) is a federal electoral district in southern New Brunswick, Canada. With its predecessor ridings, St. John—Albert, Saint John—Lancaster, and Saint John, the area has been represented in the House of Commons of Canada since 1917.

The district has always included the city of Saint John, and various suburbs and bedroom communities have been added or removed from it over the years. Presently the district also includes the towns of Quispamsis and Rothesay, the Indian reserve of The Brothers 18, and part of Simonds Parish.

The neighbouring ridings are Fundy Royal and Saint John—St. Croix.

== History ==
Historical population
Year	Pop.	±%
2001	83,463	—
2006	82,078	−1.7%
2011	84,670	+3.2%

Originally, Saint John had a special setup for representation in Parliament. The "City of St. John" returned one member, while the "City and County of St. John", which included both the County of Saint John and the City of St. John, returned one as well. Between 1872 and 1896, the "City and County" riding elected two Members of Parliament, and the City of St. John riding elected one. In effect, the city itself had two or even three Members of Parliament. This practice continued until 1914.

After 1914, the counties of Saint John and Albert were joined. At that time, the "City and County" riding and the St. John riding were merged into a new riding, called "St. John—Albert", that also incorporated parts of King's and Albert riding. The new riding returned two Members of Parliament until 1935.

In 1966, St. John—Albert was abolished when Albert County was moved to the Fundy—Royal riding. A new riding, "Saint John—Lancaster", was created.

Saint John—Lancaster was abolished in the 1976 redistribution, and a new riding with substantially the same boundaries was created and named "Saint John". The City of Lancaster had been amalgamated into Saint John.

In recent years, the Progressive Conservative Party has had the most success in the city: its members were elected in all but four elections since 1953: 1974, 1980, 2004, and 2006. Well-known Members of Parliament from the area include Father of Confederation Samuel Leonard Tilley, former Veterans Affairs Minister Gerald Merrithew and popular former mayor Elsie Wayne.

As per the 2012 federal electoral redistribution, this riding was renamed Saint John—Rothesay and lost a small portion of territory to Fundy Royal.

Following the 2022 Canadian federal electoral redistribution, territorial changes were made and the riding was renamed to Saint John—Kennebecasis. The new territorial boundary gained Quispamsis from Fundy Royal and lost all of the City of Saint John located west of the Saint John River to the newly renamed riding of Saint John—St. Croix. The name refers to the Kennebecasis Valley.

=== Members of Parliament ===
These ridings have elected the following members of Parliament:

Parliament	Years	Member	Party	Member	Party
St. John—Albert; Riding created from City and County of St. John
13th	1917 – 1921	Rupert Wilson Wigmore	Government (Unionist)	Stanley Edward Elkin	Government (Unionist)
14th	1921 – 1925	John Babington Macaulay Baxter	Conservative	Murray MacLaren	Conservative
15th	1925 – 1926	Thomas Bell	Conservative	Murray MacLaren	Conservative
16th	1926 – 1930	Thomas Bell	Conservative	Murray MacLaren	Conservative
17th	1930 – 1935	Thomas Bell	Conservative	Murray MacLaren	Conservative
18th	1935 – 1938	William Ryan	Liberal		
18th	1938 – 1940	Allan McAvity	Liberal		
19th	1940 – 1945	King Hazen	National Government		
20th	1945 – 1949	King Hazen	Progressive Conservative		
21st	1949 – 1953	Daniel Aloysius Riley	Liberal		
22nd	1953 – 1957	Thomas Miller Bell	Progressive Conservative		
23rd	1957 – 1958	Thomas Miller Bell	Progressive Conservative		
24th	1958 – 1962	Thomas Miller Bell	Progressive Conservative		
25th	1962 – 1963	Thomas Miller Bell	Progressive Conservative		
26th	1963 – 1965	Thomas Miller Bell	Progressive Conservative		
27th	1965 – 1968	Thomas Miller Bell	Progressive Conservative		
St. John—Lancaster
28th	1968 – 1972	Thomas Miller Bell	Progressive Conservative		
29th	1972 – 1974	Thomas Miller Bell	Progressive Conservative		
30th	1974 – 1979	Mike Landers	Liberal		
Saint John
31st	1979 – 1980	Eric Ferguson	Progressive Conservative		
32nd	1980 – 1984	Mike Landers	Liberal		
33rd	1984 – 1988	Gerald Merrithew	Progressive Conservative		
34th	1988 – 1993	Gerald Merrithew	Progressive Conservative		
35th	1993 – 1997	Elsie Wayne	Progressive Conservative		
36th	1997 – 2000	Elsie Wayne	Progressive Conservative		
37th	2000 – 2003	Elsie Wayne	Progressive Conservative		
37th	2003 – 2004	Elsie Wayne	Conservative		
38th	2004 – 2006	Paul Zed	Liberal		
39th	2006 – 2008	Paul Zed	Liberal		
40th	2008 – 2011	Rodney Weston	Conservative		
41st	2011 – 2015	Rodney Weston	Conservative		
Saint John—Rothesay
42nd	2015–2019	Wayne Long	Liberal		
43rd	2019–2021	Wayne Long	Liberal		
44th	2021–2025	Wayne Long	Liberal		
Saint John—Kennebecasis
45th	2025–present	Wayne Long	Liberal		

== Election results ==
Graph of election results in St. John—Albert, Saint John—Lancaster, Saint John, Saint John—Rothesay (1914–2019 minor parties that never got 2% of the vote or didn't run consistently are omitted, prior to 1968 the top two candidates were both elected) View source data.

=== Saint John—Kennebecasis, 2023 representation order ===
2025 Canadian federal election
Party	Candidate	Votes	%	±%	Expenditures
Liberal	Wayne Long	26,129	58.11	+15.51	$89,086.94
Conservative	Melissa Young	16,787	37.33	+0.94	$118,235.65
New Democratic	Armand Cormier	1,206	2.68	-10.50	$915.35
Green	David MacFarquhar	737	1.64	-1.29	$7,442.76
Libertarian	Austin Venedam	108	0.24	N/A	$0.00
Total valid votes		44,967	99.43	–0.02	$120,580.81
Total rejected ballots		257	0.57	+0.02	
Turnout		45,224	70.01	+9.44	
Eligible voters (Note: Number of eligible voters does not include election day registrations.)		64,595			
Liberal notional hold		Swing		+7.28	
Source: Elections Canada

2021 federal election redistributed results
Party	Vote	%
Liberal	16,082	42.60
Conservative	13,737	36.39
New Democratic	4,975	13.18
People's	1,851	4.90
Green	1,106	2.93
Total valid votes	37,751	99.45
Rejected ballots	210	0.55
Registered voters/ estimated turnout	62,675	60.57

=== Saint John—Rothesay, 2013 representation order ===
Graph of election results in Saint John—Rothesay (since 2013; minor parties that never got 2% of the vote or didn't run consistently are omitted; prior to 1968 the top two candidates were both elected) View source data.

2021 Canadian federal election: Saint John—Rothesay
Party	Candidate	Votes	%	±%	Expenditures
Liberal	Wayne Long	17,371	46.38	+8.94	$86,136.71
Conservative	Mel Norton	12,315	32.88	-1.07	$89,711.32
New Democratic	Don Paulin	4,821	12.87	+0.64	$4,012.75
People's	Nicholas Pereira	2,001	5.34	+2.29	$3,899.08
Green	Ann McAllister	948	2.53	-7.57	$365.47
Total valid votes/expense limit		37,456	–	–	$103,960.22
Total rejected ballots					
Turnout			58.99	-6.19	
Registered voters		63,495			
Liberal hold		Swing		+5.01	
Source: Elections Canada

2019 Canadian federal election: Saint John—Rothesay
Party	Candidate	Votes	%	±%	Expenditures
Liberal	Wayne Long	15,443	37.43	-11.37	$65,376.07
Conservative	Rodney Weston	14,006	33.95	+3.41	$98,624.09
New Democratic	Armand Cormier	5,046	12.23	-5.30	$2,746.93
Green	Ann McAllister	4,165	10.10	+6.97	none listed
People's	Adam J. C. Salesse	1,260	3.05		none listed
Independent	Stuart Jamieson	1,183	2.87		$6,611.27
Independent	Neville Barnett	150	0.36		$170.00
Total valid votes/expense limit		41,253	99.40		
Total rejected ballots		250	0.60	+0.12	
Turnout		41,503	65.18	-3.65	
Eligible voters		63,677			
Liberal hold		Swing		-7.39	
Source: Elections Canada

2015 Canadian federal election: Saint John—Rothesay
Party	Candidate	Votes	%	±%	Expenditures
Liberal	Wayne Long	20,634	48.80	+32.81	–
Conservative	Rodney Weston	12,915	30.54	-19.18	–
New Democratic	AJ Griffin	7,411	17.53	-13.2	–
Green	Sharon Murphy	1,321	3.12	+0.35	–
Total valid votes/expense limit		42,281	100.0		$196,334.01
Total rejected ballots		205	–	–	
Turnout		42,486	69.38	–	
Eligible voters		61,236			
Source: Elections Canada

2011 federal election redistributed results
Party	Vote	%
Conservative	17,881	49.72
New Democratic	11,052	30.73
Liberal	5,750	15.99
Green	992	2.76
Others	288	0.80

=== Saint John, 2003 Representation Order ===
Graph of election results in Saint John (1976–2013 minor parties that never got 2% of the vote or didn't run consistently are omitted, prior to 1968 the top two candidates were both elected) View source data.

2011 Canadian federal election: Saint John—Rothesay
Party	Candidate	Votes	%	±%	Expenditures
Conservative	Rodney Weston	18,456	49.73	+10.18	$79,348.63
New Democratic	Rob Moir	11,382	30.67	+14.71	$23,584.68
Liberal	Stephen Chase	5,964	16.07	-22.06	$42,496.31
Green	Sharon Murphy-Flatt	1,017	2.74	-2.68	$2,700.77
Independent	Arthur Watson Jr.	294	0.79	–	$251.37
Total valid votes/expense limit		37,113	100.0		$82,011.29
Total rejected, unmarked and declined ballots		176	0.47		
Turnout		37,289	58.02	+4.01	
Eligible voters		64,264			
Conservative hold		Swing		-2.26	

2008 Canadian federal election: Saint John—Rothesay
Party	Candidate	Votes	%	±%	Expenditures
Conservative	Rodney Weston	13,782	39.55	+0.25	$73,497.84
Liberal	Paul Zed	13,285	38.13	-4.79	$69,234.99
New Democratic	Tony Mowery	5,560	15.96	+0.32	$2,720.91
Green	Mike Richardson	1,888	5.42	+3.28	$1,008.49
Marijuana	Michael Moffat	330	0.95	–	none listed
Total valid votes/expense limit		34,845	100.0		$79,702
Total rejected, unmarked and declined ballots		187	0.53	±0	
Turnout		35,032	54.01	-7.38	
Eligible voters		64,868			
Conservative gain from Liberal		Swing		+2.52	

2006 Canadian federal election: Saint John—Rothesay
Party	Candidate	Votes	%	±%	Expenditures
Liberal	Paul Zed	17,202	42.92	-0.36	$55,428.82
Conservative	John Wallace	15,753	39.30	+5.68	$65,915.16
New Democratic	Terry Albright	6,267	15.64	-3.42	$6,294.91
Green	Vern Garnett	858	2.14	-0.08	none listed
Total valid votes/expense limit		40,080	100.0		$74,214
Total rejected, unmarked and declined ballots		214	0.53		
Turnout		40,294	61.39	+6.36	
Eligible voters		65,639			
Liberal hold		Swing		-3.02	

2004 Canadian federal election: Saint John—Rothesay
Party	Candidate	Votes	%	±%	Expenditures
Liberal	Paul Zed	15,725	43.28	+13.12	$60,257.89
Conservative	Bob McVicar	12,212	33.62	-25.88	$59,750.72
New Democratic	Terry Albright	6,926	19.06	+10.34	$13,450.03
Green	Jonathan Cormier	807	2.22	+1.92	$1,401.24
Marijuana	Jim Wood	369	1.02	-0.38	none listed
Independent	Tom Oland	290	0.80	–	$235.21
Total valid votes/expense limit		36,329	100.0		$73,296
Total rejected, unmarked and declined ballots		224	0.61		
Turnout		36,553	55.03	-5.46	
Eligible voters		66,423			
Liberal notional gain from Progressive Conservative		Swing		+19.50	
Changes from 2000 are based on redistributed results. Change for the Conservative Party is based on the combined total of the Progressive Conservative Party and the Canadian Alliance.

2000 federal election redistributed results
Party	Vote	%
Progressive Conservative	19,236	49.05
Liberal	11,829	30.16
Alliance	4,099	10.45
New Democratic	3,421	8.72
Others	635	1.62

=== Saint John, 1996 Representation Order ===
2000 Canadian federal election: Saint John—Rothesay
Party	Candidate	Votes	%	±%
Progressive Conservative	Elsie Wayne	16,751	50.9	-12.2
Liberal	Paul Zed	9,535	29.0	+13.1
New Democratic	Rod Hill	2,989	9.1	-1.3
Alliance	Peter Touchbourne	2,980	9.1	-0.7
Marijuana	Jim Wood	461	1.4	+1.4
Green	Vern Garnett	131	0.3	+0.3
Natural Law	Miville Couture	52	0.2	-0.5
Total valid votes		32,899	100.0	

1997 Canadian federal election: Saint John—Rothesay
Party	Candidate	Votes	%	±%
Progressive Conservative	Elsie Wayne	22,227	63.1	+19.8
Liberal	Diana Alexander	5,612	15.9	-17.7
New Democratic	Larry Hanley	3,679	10.4	+6.3
Reform	George Richardson	3,467	9.8	+3.6
Natural Law	Christopher B. Collrin	232	0.7	n/c
Total valid votes		35,217	100.0	

=== Saint John, previous elections ===
1993 Canadian federal election: Saint John—Rothesay
Party	Candidate	Votes	%	±%
Progressive Conservative	Elsie Wayne	15,123	43.3	+0.2
Liberal	Pat Landers	11,736	33.6	-5.0
Independent	Joe Boyce	3,685	10.6	+10.6
Reform	John Erbs	2,171	6.2	+6.2
New Democratic	Shirley Brown	1,443	4.1	-8.4
Canada Party	Jim Webb	368	1.1	+1.1
Natural Law	Christopher Collrin	252	0.7	+0.7
National	Joy Hobson	146	0.4	+0.4
Total valid votes		34,924	100.0	

1988 Canadian federal election: Saint John—Rothesay
Party	Candidate	Votes	%	±%
Progressive Conservative	Gerry Merrithew	16,798	43.1	-9.1
Liberal	Joe Boyce	15,067	38.6	+13.1
New Democratic	Judith Meinert	4,883	12.5	-8.7
Confederation of Regions	Jim Webb	1,806	4.6	+4.6
Libertarian	Thomas Gamblin	289	0.7	-0.1
Independent	Gary Zatzman	162	0.4	+0.4
Total valid votes		39,005	100.0	

1984 Canadian federal election: Saint John—Rothesay
Party	Candidate	Votes	%	±%
Progressive Conservative	Gerry Merrithew	16,604	52.2	+13.2
Liberal	Cliff Warner	8,109	25.5	-15.9
New Democratic	Mary Palmer	6,752	21.2	+2.3
Libertarian	Peter Jones	242	0.8	+0.6
Social Credit	Gordon Simons	102	0.3	+0.3
Total valid votes		31,809	100.0	

1980 Canadian federal election: Saint John—Rothesay
Party	Candidate	Votes	%	±%
Liberal	Mike Landers	13,122	41.4	+1.8
Progressive Conservative	Eric Ferguson	12,363	39.0	-2.6
New Democratic	David M. Brown	5,978	18.9	+0.0
Independent	Marilynn Fox	103	0.3	-
Libertarian	Peter Jones	66	0.2	-
Marxist–Leninist	Gilles DesRosiers	35	0.1	-
Total valid votes		31,667	100.0	
lop.parl.ca

1979 Canadian federal election: Saint John—Rothesay
Party	Candidate	Votes	%	±%
Progressive Conservative	Eric Ferguson	13,989	41.6	+0.6
Liberal	Mike Landers	13,316	39.6	-6.5
New Democratic	Eldon Richardson	6,358	18.9	+6.5
Total valid votes		33,663	100.0	

=== Saint John—Lancaster, 1966–1976 ===
Graph of election results in Saint John—Lancaster (1966-1976 minor parties that never got 2% of the vote or didn't run consistently are omitted, prior to 1968 the top two candidates were both elected) View source data.

1974 Canadian federal election: Saint John—Rothesay
Party	Candidate	Votes	%	±%
Liberal	Mike Landers	12,860	46.1	+3.9
Progressive Conservative	Tom Bell	11,419	41.0	-12.9
New Democratic	Eldon Richardson	3,457	12.4	+9.9
Marxist–Leninist	Jay Baxter	118	0.4	+0.4
Total valid votes		27,854	100.0	

1972 Canadian federal election: Saint John—Rothesay
Party	Candidate	Votes	%	±%
Progressive Conservative	Tom Bell	16,350	53.9	+0.9
Liberal	Arthur Gould	12,783	42.2	+1.2
New Democratic	Joseph Drummond	788	2.5	-2.6
Social Credit	Tom Enright	394	1.3	+1.3
Total valid votes		30,315	100.0	

1968 Canadian federal election: Saint John—Rothesay
Party	Candidate	Votes	%	±%
Progressive Conservative	Tom Bell	15,756	53.0	+1.6
Liberal	William Ryan	12,160	41.0	+4.4
New Democratic	Eldon Richardson	1,508	5.1	-6.8
Independent	Mildred Crawford	268	0.9	+0.9
Total valid votes		29,692	100.0	

=== St. John—Albert 1914–1966 ===
Graph of election results in St. John—Albert (1914-1966 minor parties that never got 2% of the vote or didn't run consistently are omitted, prior to 1968 the top two candidates were both elected) View source data.

1965 Canadian federal election: Saint John—Rothesay
Party	Candidate	Votes	%	±%
Progressive Conservative	Tom Bell	21,909	51.4	-0.3
Liberal	Arthur Whelly	15,609	36.6	-3.3
New Democratic	Eldon Richardson	5,081	11.9	+7.4
Total valid votes		42,599	100.0	

1963 Canadian federal election: Saint John—Rothesay
Party	Candidate	Votes	%	±%
Progressive Conservative	Tom Bell	21,584	51.7	-0.1
Liberal	Arthur Whelly	16,669	39.9	+1.4
New Democratic	John Simonds	1,869	4.5	-1.6
Social Credit	Paul Sherwood	1,606	3.8	+0.1
Total valid votes		41,728	100.0	

1962 Canadian federal election: Saint John—Rothesay
Party	Candidate	Votes	%	±%
Progressive Conservative	Tom Bell	22,586	51.8	-12.1
Liberal	George Urquhart	16,790	38.5	+5.6
New Democratic	Eldon Richardson	2,641	6.1	+2.8
Social Credit	Harvey Lainson	1,608	3.7	+3.7
Total valid votes		43,625	100.0	

1958 Canadian federal election: Saint John—Rothesay
Party	Candidate	Votes	%	±%
Progressive Conservative	Tom Bell	21,983	63.9	+10.3
Liberal	George McLeod	13,917	32.9	-13.5
Co-operative Commonwealth	Eldon Richardson	1,394	3.3	+3.3
Total valid votes		37,294	100.0	

1957 Canadian federal election: Saint John—Rothesay
Party	Candidate	Votes	%	±%
Progressive Conservative	Tom Bell	21,983	53.6	+4.1
Liberal	Daniel Riley	19,047	46.4	-1.7
Total valid votes		41,030	100.0	

1953 Canadian federal election: Saint John—Rothesay
Party	Candidate	Votes	%	±%
Progressive Conservative	Tom Bell	18,881	49.5	+4.8
Liberal	Daniel Riley	18,338	48.1	-0.8
Co-operative Commonwealth	Raymond McAfee	933	2.4	-4.0
Total valid votes		38,152	100.0	

1949 Canadian federal election: Saint John—Rothesay
Party	Candidate	Votes	%	±%
Liberal	Daniel Riley	18,691	48.9	+7.8
Progressive Conservative	King Hazen	17,052	44.7	-2.1
Co-operative Commonwealth	Raymond McAfee	2,445	6.4	-5.6
Total valid votes		38,188	100.0	

1945 Canadian federal election: Saint John—Rothesay
Party	Candidate	Votes	%	±%
Progressive Conservative	King Hazen	16,205	46.8	-3.5
Liberal	David Lawrence MacLaren	14,248	41.1	-6.1
Co-operative Commonwealth	William Arrowsmith	761	12.0	+9.5
Total valid votes		31,214	100.0	

1940 Canadian federal election: Saint John—Rothesay
Party	Candidate	Votes	%	±%
National Government	King Hazen	15,110	50.3	+13.4
Liberal	Allan McAvity	14,197	47.2	-0.8
Co-operative Commonwealth	James Fritch	761	2.5	+2.5
Total valid votes		30,068	100.0	

Note: popular vote is compared to 1935 general election.

By-election on February 21, 1938 On William Ryan's death, April 1, 1938
Party	Candidate	Votes
Liberal	Allan McAvity	acclaimed

1935 Canadian federal election: Saint John—Rothesay
Party	Candidate	Votes	%	±%
Liberal	William Ryan	15,125	48.0	+13.9
Conservative	Douglas King Hazen	11,643	36.9	-19.0
Reconstruction	Paul Cross	4,094	13.0	
Independent Liberal	Howe Cowan	672	2.1	
Total valid votes		31,534	100.0	

Note: popular vote is compared to the party's total share of the popular vote in the 1930 general election.

1930 Canadian federal election: Saint John—Rothesay
Party	Candidate	Votes	%	Elected
Conservative	Murray MacLaren	16,454	33.0	✓
Conservative	Thomas Bell	16,395	32.9	✓
Liberal	Allan McAvity	8,595	17.3	
Liberal	William Ryan	8,371	16.8	
Total valid votes		49,815	100.0	

Total Conservative vote: 32,849, or 65.9% of the total, an increase of 4.2% from the 1926 general election.
Total Liberal vote: 16,966, or 34.1%, a decrease of 4.2% from the 1926 general election.

1926 Canadian federal election: St. John—Albert
Party	Candidate	Votes	%	Elected
Conservative	Murray MacLaren	12,441	31.0	✓
Conservative	Thomas Bell	12,310	30.7	✓
Liberal	William Michael Ryan	8,007	20.0	
Liberal	Robert Thomas Hayes	7,356	18.3	
Total valid votes		40,114	100.0%	

Total Conservative vote: 24,751, or 61.7% of the total, a decrease of 0.2% from the 1925 general election.
Total Liberal vote: 15,363, or 38.3% of the total, an increase of 0.2% from the 1925 general election.

1925 Canadian federal election: St. John—Albert
Party	Candidate	Votes	%	Elected
Conservative	Murray MacLaren	14,623	31.3	✓
Conservative	Thomas Bell	14,250	30.5	✓
Liberal	Walter Edward Foster	9,348	20.0	
Liberal	Robert Thomas Hayes	8,435	18.1	
Total valid votes		46,656	100.0	

Total Conservative vote: 28,873, or 61.9% of the total, an increase of 11.6% from the 1921 general election.
Total Liberal vote: 17,783, or 38.1% of the total, a decrease of 6.7% from the 1921 general election.

1921 Canadian federal election: St. John—Albert
Party	Candidate	Votes	%	Elected
Conservative	John Babington Baxter	11,646	26.0	✓
Conservative	Murray MacLaren	10,901	24.3	✓
Liberal	H. R. McLellan	10,531	23.5	
Liberal	William Patrick Broderick	9,546	21.3	
Progressive	Frederick Alexander Campbell	1,224	2.7	
Progressive	William Mayhew Calhoun	985	2.2	
Total valid votes		44,833	100.0	

Total Conservative vote: 22,547, or 50.3% of the total, an increase of 0.3% from the 1920 by-election.
Total Liberal vote: 20,077, or 44.8% of the total, a decrease of 5.2% from the 1920 by-election.
Total Progressive vote: 2,209, or 4.9% of the total.

By-election on September 20, 1920
Party	Candidate	Votes	%	±%
Conservative	Rupert Wilson Wigmore	13,611	50.0	-20.8
Liberal	Alban Frederick Emery	13,594	50.0	+20.8
Total valid votes		27,205	100.0	

Note: Conservative vote is compared to Government vote in 1917 election, and Liberal vote is compared to Opposition vote. Popular vote is compared to the party's total share of the popular vote in the 1917 general election.

1917 Canadian federal election: Saint John—Rothesay
Party	Candidate	Votes	%	Elected
Government (Unionist)	Rupert Wilson Wigmore	13,611	35.4	✓
Government (Unionist)	Stanley Edward Elkin	13,594	35.4	✓
Liberal	William Patrick Broderick	5,694	14.8	
Liberal	Alban Frederick Emery	5,530	14.4	
Total valid votes		38,429	100.0	

Total Conservative vote: 27,205, or 70.8% of the total.
Total Liberal vote: 11,224, or 29.2% of the total.

== See also ==
- List of Canadian electoral districts
- Historical federal electoral districts of Canada
