= William Black (1771–1866) =

Canadian politician

4th Mayor of Saint John, New Brunswick
- In office 1828–1829
- Preceded by: John Robinson
- Succeeded by: Lauchlan Donaldson

6th Mayor of Saint John, New Brunswick
- In office 1832–1833
- Preceded by: Lauchlan Donaldson
- Succeeded by: John McNeil Wilmot

12th Mayor of Saint John, New Brunswick
- In office 1840–1843
- Preceded by: Robert F. Hazen
- Succeeded by: Lauchlan Donaldson

Personal details
- Born: 1771 Aberdeen, Scotland
- Died: June 18, 1866 (aged 94–95)

William Black (1771 – 18 June 1866) was a Canadian shipper, merchant, and office-holder born in Aberdeen, Scotland.

Black grew up and was educated in Scotland. He immigrated to New Brunswick in 1798 to work with his brother John, an established shipping and timber export merchant. By 1808, he was managing their timber trade in Saint John while his brother opened a new office in Halifax, Nova Scotia. In a few years, they had the largest business enterprises in British North America. They both married daughters of Christopher Billopp, a leading an influential businessman and member of the Legislative Council of New Brunswick.

Black was appointed to the Council in 1817 by George Stracey Smyth, the Lieutenant Governor. He eventually achieved the position of president of the council.

During his time as acting governor of the colony of New Brunswick in 1829 to 1831, they had named the small village of Blackville after him.
