= Thomas J. Higgins (Canadian politician) =

Canadian politician (1931–1995)

- Higgins in 1989

73rd Mayor of Saint John, New Brunswick
- In office February 14, 1994 – 1995
- Preceded by: Elsie Wayne
- Succeeded by: Shirley McAlary

Personal details
- Born: 1931
- Died: August 24, 1995 (aged 63–64)
- Spouse: Dorothy Ann MacDonald

Thomas J. Higgins (1931 – August 24, 1995) was a Canadian educator and municipal politician who served as the mayor of Saint John, New Brunswick from 1994 to 1995. He was Saint John's first Catholic mayor.

== Life and career ==
Higgins attended the St. Francis Xavier University in Antigonish, Nova Scotia, where he met his future wife Dorothy Ann MacDonald.

Higgins taught at St. Malachy's High School, serving as a coach, as well as a principal until his retirement. During the 1970s, Higgins served as Deputy Mayor of Saint John, and he was sworn in as Mayor of Saint John on February 14, 1994. During his time as mayor, Higgins attended the Bangor-Saint John Sister City Exchange program, a cooperation meeting between Saint John city officials and American city officials of Bangor, Maine to discuss strengthening the relationship between Maine and New Brunswick. On May 8, 1995, Higgins had a memorial stone placed at Jervis Bay-Ross Memorial Park in recognition for the Royal Canadian Legion Branch #53. He additionally honoured two individuals with the Freedom of the City.

During the summer of 1995, Higgins resigned from his position due to declining in health. He was succeeded by Shirley McAlary, his interim mayor.

== Personal life and death ==
On August 24, 1995, Higgins died from cancer. His wife, Dorothy Ann Higgins, died in March 2013 at the age of 79. The Thomas J. Higgins Award was created in his honour, with recipients including Moosehead Breweries. His daughter, Patty Higgins, was another municipal politician who was elected to the Saint John City Council in 2008, and ran for mayor of Saint John in 2016.

Political offices
Preceded by Elsie Wayne	Mayor of Saint John; 1994–1995	Succeeded by Shirley McAlary
