= William Campbell (Canadian mayor) =

2nd Mayor of Saint John, New Brunswick
- In office 1795–1816
- Preceded by: Gabriel George Ludlow
- Succeeded by: John Robinson

Personal details
- Born: 1742 Argyllshire, Scotland
- Died: February 10, 1823 (aged 80–81) Saint John, Colony of New Brunswick

William Campbell (1742 – February 10, 1823) was a Scottish-born political figure in the pre-Confederation Province of New Brunswick, Canada. He served as the second mayor of Saint John from 1795 to 1816.

== Life and career ==
William Campbell was born in 1742 in Argyllshire, Scotland. Early in his life, he emigrated to Worcester, Massachusetts, working as a merchant. Campbell later moved to New York and fought in the American Revolutionary War until 1783 when he evacuated to Halifax, Nova Scotia and later Saint John. In 1795, Campbell succeeded Gabriel George Ludlow's position as the mayor of Saint John, serving in this capacity until retiring in 1816 due to his age. He died on February 10, 1823, at the age of 81.
