= List of mayors of Saint John, New Brunswick =

Mayor of Saint John
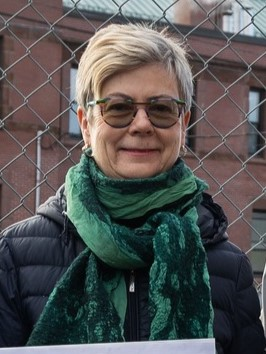
- Incumbent; Donna Reardon since June 7, 2021
- Style: Your Worship
- Term length: 4 years (Since 2004)
- Inaugural holder: Gabriel George Ludlow
- Formation: May 18, 1785
- Salary: $88,000 ($18,000 additional allowance), 2012
- Website: City of Saint John

The Mayor of the City of Saint John is the head of the elected municipal council of Saint John, New Brunswick, Canada. Saint John Common Council consists of a mayor (chair) and 10 councillors. The city has a ward system with four of roughly equal population. This municipal arrangement was first adopted in the 2008 municipal election after a plebiscite held October 9, 2007. The mayor is directly elected along with two councillors that run at large. Since 2021, the deputy mayor has been chosen by Common Council after each election, having previously been the councillor at large who gained a plurality of votes. The current deputy mayor is John MacKenzie. Each ward elects two councillor.

Since the incorporation of Saint John in 1785, the mayor has served as the chief representative of the city. Officeholders were first appointed by the Governor of New Brunswick, under an order in council. By the end of the end of the nineteenth century, the mayor was elected by the alderman of Common Council. In 1854, the office was directly elected by Saint John residents. As head of the largest city in New Brunswick, many mayors have served as elected officials at the federal and provincial level both before and after their tenure.

Since 1785, 67 individuals have held the office of mayor. Notably, Samuel Davis, 1977-1980, served as the first elected Jewish Mayor of Saint John. In 1983 Elsie Wayne was elected the first woman mayor. She served until 1993. While serving only two years, Thomas J. Higgins was the first Catholic Mayor of Saint John. The former, Don Darling, was elected May 9, 2016. Donna Reardon, incumbent, was elected May 25, 2021.

== List of Mayors ==
Appointed by Governor-In-Council
No.	Mayor	Term in office	Notes
1	Gabriel George Ludlow (1736-1808)	May 18, 1785 – 1795	
2	William Campbell (1742-1823)	1795 – 1816	
3	John Robinson (1762–1828)	1816 – 1828	Died in office
4	William Black	1828 – 1829	
5	Lauchlan Donaldson (?-1873)	1829 – 1832	
6	William Black	1832 – 1833	
7	John M. Wilmot (1775-1847)	1833 – 1834	
8	Benjamin L. Peters	1834 – 1835	
9	William H. Street	1835 – 1836	
10	John Robertson (1799-1876)	1836 – 1837	
11	Robert F. Hazen	1837 – 1840	
12	William Black	1840 – 1843	
13	Lauchlan Donaldson (?-1873)	1843 – 1847	
14	John R. Partelow (1795-1865)	1847 – 1848	
15	William H. Street	1848 – 1849	
16	Robert D. Wilmot (1809-1891)	1849 – 1850	
17	Henry Chubb	1850 – 1851	

Elected indirectly by Common Council
No.	Mayor	Term in office	Notes
18	Thomas Harding	1851 – 1852	
19	William O. Smith	1852 – 1853	
20	James Olive	1853 – 1854	

Elected directly by residents
No.	Mayor	Term in office	Notes
21	James Olive	1854 – 1855	
22	William O. Smith	1855 – 1859	
23	Thomas Mcavity	1859 – 1863	
24	Isaac Woodward	1863 – 1866	
25	Aaron Alward (1828-1886)	1866 – 1870	
26	Thomas M. Reed	1870 – 1874	
27	A. Chipman Smith	1864 – 1877	
28	Sylvester Z. Earle (1822-1888)	1877 – 1879	
29	Charles R. Ray	1879 – 1881	
30	Simeon Jones	1881 – 1884	
31	J. Mcgregor Grant	1884 – 1885	
32	J.S. Boies Deveber (1829-1908)	1885 – 1887	
33	Henry J. Thorne	1887 – 1889	
34	George A. Barker	1889	Died in office
35	I. Allen Jack	July 7, 1889 – August 9, 1889	As Recorder Under City Charter
36	W. Albert Lockhart	1889 – 1891	
37	Thomas W. Peters	1891 – 1894	
38	George Robertson	1894 – 1898	
39	Edward Sears	1898 – 1900	
40	John Waterhouse Daniel (1845-1933)	1900 – 1902	
41	Walter W. White (1862-1952)	1902 – 1906	
42	Edward Sears	1906 – 1908	
43	Thomas H. Bullock	1908 – 1910	
44	James H. Frink (?-1933)	1910 – 1916	
45	Robert T. Hayes	April 24, 1916 – 1920	
46	E. Allen Schofield	1920 – 1922	
47	H. R. McLellan (1865-1939)	1922	Recalled following a by-election
48	G. Frederick Fisher	1922 – 1924	
49	Frank L. Potts (1867-1926)	1924 – 1926	Died in office
50	Walter W. White (1862-1952)	1926 – 1932	
51	James W. Brittain (?-1961)	April 11, 1932 – 1936	
52	David Laurence MacLaren (1893-1960)	1936 – 1940	
53	Charles R. Wasson (?-1967)	1940 – 1944	
54	James D. McKenna (1874-1949)	1944 – 1948	
55	Ernest W. Patterson	1948 – 1950	
56	George E. Howard	1950 – 1952	
57	Ernest W. Patterson	October 20, 1952 – 1954	
58	Gilbert B. Peat	1954 – 1956	
59	William W. Macaulay	October 15, 1956 – 1958	
60	David Laurence MacLaren (1893-1960)	1958 – September 7, 1960	Died in office
61	James A. Whitebone	September 7, 1960 – October 17, 1960	Completed MacLaren's mayoral term as Deputy Mayor
62	Eric Teed (1926-2010)	1960 – 1964	
63	Stephen Weyman (1922-1997)	1964 – 1966	
64	Arthur L. Gould	1966	
64	Arthur L. Gould	January 1967 – June 1967	
65	Joseph A. Macdougall	1967 – 1969	
66	H. Avard Loomer (1915-1969)	June 22 – July 18, 1969	Died in office
67	James E. Calvin	October 7, 1969 – 1971	
68	Bob Lockhart (1931-2023)	June 1971 – 1974	
69	Edis A. Flewwelling	June 10, 1974 – 1977	
70	Samuel Davis (1914-1996)	1977 – 1980	
71	Bob Lockhart (1931-2023)	1980 – 1983	
72	Elsie Wayne (1932-2016)	1983 – 1993	
73	Thomas J. Higgins (1931-1995)	1994 – 1995	
74	Shirley McAlary	1995 – May 11, 2004	
75	Norman McFarlane	2004 – 2008	
76	Ivan Court (1949-2025)	2008 – 2012	
77	Mel Norton	2012 – 2016	
78	Don Darling	2016 – 2021	
79	Donna Reardon	2021 – present	
