= Samuel Davis (Canadian politician) =

Canadian politician (1914–1996)

70th Mayor of Saint John
- In office 1977–1980
- Preceded by: Edis A. Flewwelling
- Succeeded by: Bob Lockhart

Personal details
- Born: 1914
- Died: 1996 (aged 81–82)
- Spouse: Gladys (née Wiezel) Davis
- Education: University of New Brunswick; Massachusetts Institute of Technology (M.E., 1939)

Samuel Davis (1914–1996) was a Canadian engineer and municipal politician who served as the 70th mayor of Saint John, New Brunswick from 1977 to 1980. He was first elected as a Saint John City Council member in 1969, and elected as mayor in 1977. He was the first Jewish mayor of Saint John.

== Life and career ==
Samuel Davis was born in 1914, in Saint John, New Brunswick. His family immigrated to the city. He was educated at the Saint John High School, from which he graduated and began attending vocational school to study motor mechanics. He went on to attend the University of New Brunswick (UNB), where he received an honorary degree, and moved on to the Massachusetts Institute of Technology where he received his Master of Engineering in 1939. He was employed at UNB as a civil engineer, and worked during World War II as an aeronautical engineer. Additionally, Davis ran a shoe store on King Street called Wiezel's, named after the maiden name of his wife, Gladys (née Wiezel) Davis.

Davis would first serve as a school board member, and was first elected as a Saint John City Council member in 1969. On 11 May 1977, Davis was elected as Mayor of Saint John after defeating the incumbent Edis A. Flewwelling. At the time, he served on the Board of Governors of UNB. Davis was additionally the first Jewish mayor in Saint John.

In 1979, Davis presented awards for Fred Hodges, Saint John's first visible minority councilor and civil rights and labour activist. during a dinner in his honouring. Davis was defeated in the 1980 election by Bob Lockhart. He continued to serve as a councilor until at least 1989.

== Personal life and death ==
In 1940, Davis became married to his wife, Gladys Wiezel. Davis died in 1996. He is one of multiple notable Jewish community members displayed in the Saint John Jewish Historical Museum. In 2005, Davis' son, Gary Davis, established the Gladys and Samuel Davis Fund.

Political offices
Preceded by Edis A. Flewwelling	Mayor of Saint John; 1977–1980	Succeeded by Bob Lockhart
