= John Middleton Smith =

New Brunswick man convicted of attempted buggery

John Middleton Smith was a Saint John, New Brunswick schoolmaster and Church of England lay reader who was charged with buggery and attempted buggery in 1806. His case has attracted attention in modern legal and social history as an unusually well-documented example of early nineteenth-century prosecutions for same-sex acts in British North America and for the insight it provides into Loyalist society, clerical authority, and attitudes to male same-sex behaviour.

== Biography ==
=== Early life and clerical background ===
John Middleton Smith was born in England and trained as an ordained minister of the Church of England. The exact date and place of his birth remain unknown, as do details of his family background. The available sources suggest he was forced to leave his English parish because of what was described as “cursed conduct.” On a subsequent voyage to the West Indies, probably Jamaica, his clerical credentials were reportedly lost in a shipwreck, and he did not obtain replacements from England.

By March 1805 he had settled in Saint John, New Brunswick, where he served as lay reader at St. John’s Chapel in Carleton while keeping a school on the east side of the harbour, teaching in his own house. Trinity Church records from March 1805 note that an allowance of twenty pounds per annum was voted to “John Middleton Smith” for his services as reader in the chapel, indicating formal local recognition of his position.

=== Position in Saint John society ===
Smith enjoyed favour with President Gabriel George Ludlow, the leading political figure in New Brunswick, and with Ludlow’s family, a connection that enhanced his standing in the city. He also had supporters among merchants, vestrymen and aldermen associated with Trinity Church, several of whom later appeared as jurors or sureties in the legal proceedings against him.

Despite this support, there were tensions within the Anglican community with prominent laymen such as Jonathan Wetmore admonished Smith about his conduct and the need to protect the reputation of the Church and of the President’s household, suggesting that rumours or concerns about his behaviour circulated before formal charges were laid.

=== Allegations and charges of buggery ===
In late December 1805 John Ketchum, a resident of Carleton and member of St. John’s Chapel, informed President Ludlow that he intended to swear out a complaint accusing Smith of buggery. Subsequent investigations led to multiple allegations involving Ketchum and several younger males, including charges that Smith attempted to use his authority as schoolmaster and lay reader to obtain sexual access.

On 18 March 1806 Smith was indicted for buggery with John Ketchum and James Stackhouse and for assault with intent to commit buggery on Paul Phillips, George Godsoe, Samuel Jones and Stephen Jones. The indictments used the language of the English Buggery Act, describing the “detestable and abominable crime of Buggery (not to be named among Christians)” and framed the alleged acts as “against the order of nature” and an offence against both divine and human law.

=== Trial ===
The proceedings against Smith were held at the Saint John assizes, and unusually detailed bench notes from the presiding judge survive, making the case much better documented than most contemporary prosecutions for sexual offences. Evidence included testimony about Smith’s relations with pupils or younger men whom he offered to teach “gratis” and lodge in his home, accounts of drinking and overnight stays at his house, and statements about scriptural arguments used to challenge or justify his conduct.

==== The Case (December 1805 – June 1806) ====
December 15, 1805: John Ketchum was invited to Smith's house after dinner. Smith made sexual advances, claiming to be female, having "monthly courses," pregnancy experience, and female anatomy. Ketchum reported experiencing what he believed was a woman's anatomical feature during the encounter.

December 26–27: Ketchum reported the matter to President Ludlow. Medical examination by Drs. Paddock and Emerson confirmed Smith was male.

January–March 1806: Multiple allegations emerged from James Stackhouse, Samuel Jones, George Godsoe, Paul Phillips, and Stephen Jones, describing similar attempted seduction patterns and presentations of female clothing and identity.

June 3–11, 1806: Trial at Court of Oyer and Terminer and General Gaol Delivery, presided over by Chief Justice George Duncan Ludlow who was Gabriel's brother. Solicitor General Ward Chipman prosecuted; John Murray Bliss and William Botsford defended Smith.

==== Verdict and sentence ====
On 5 June 1806 the grand jury returned “no true bill” on some of the misdemeanour charges, including those involving George Godsoe and Paul Phillips, effectively dismissing those counts. On 11 June Smith was acquitted of the capital charges of buggery but found guilty of attempted buggery in relation to Samuel Jones and at least one other youth, offences that were treated as misdemeanours; he thus escaped the death penalty but faced punishment by fine, imprisonment and the pillory in accordance with contemporary practice.

For each of the two misdemeanor convictions, Smith received fine of £5 per count with total £10, plus imprisonment of 3 months in gaol. He was also sentenced to the pillory: 1 hour in the Market Square at the foot of King Street by the old county court house, on two separate days. The pillory sentence was particularly harsh for someone of Smith's standing. Contemporary records indicate it was intended as public humiliation in front of the entire Saint John community, where he was widely known as a schoolmaster and Church lay reader. The pillory exposed him to crowds—reportedly including schoolboys he had previously disciplined—who pelted him with garbage, mud, rotten eggs, and vegetables from the nearby filthy market slip.

==== Afterwards ====
Smith did not complete his full sentence. According to Hutchinson's account, once his prominent supporters realized he had been convicted, they rapidly withdrew support. Most critically, President Gabriel George Ludlow — Smith's most powerful patron, issued a commutation on 21 of July 1806, commuting the remainder of Smith's imprisonment and waived the remaining fines, contingent on one absolute condition: Smith must immediately depart the Province of New Brunswick and never return under any circumstances. This was effectively permanent banishment. The commutation served two purposes: it prevented further scandal and community upheaval while removing Smith from the colony entirely. Smith subsequently disappears from the documentary record, and the circumstances of his later life remain unknown.

== Historiographical significance ==
Legal historian Lorna Hutchinson’s article “Buggery Trials in Saint John, 1806: The Case of John M. Smith”, published in the University of New Brunswick Law Journal is the principal modern secondary study of the case, analysing the surviving court records alongside other Canadian and English material on same-sex prosecutions. Hutchinson situates the case within the broader historiography of sexual regulation, arguing that it illuminates how Loyalist elites, ecclesiastical authorities and ordinary townspeople negotiated allegations involving a clergyman or quasi-clerical figure accused of an “unnatural” crime.

The case is also cited in comparative work on buggery and sodomy laws as an example of how the English criminal law on same-sex acts was applied in colonial North America and how evidentiary issues and jury composition shaped outcomes in such trials. Because of the richness of the bench notes and parish records, Smith’s prosecution is used to explore themes of clerical hypocrisy, youth vulnerability, and the interaction between religious authority and criminal justice in the early nineteenth century.

== Bibliography ==
- Hutchinson, Lorna. "Buggery Trials in Saint John, 1806: The Case of John M. Smith." University of New Brunswick Law Journal, vol. 40 (1991): 130–148.
- Kinsman, Gary. The Regulation of Desire: Homo and Hetero Sexualities. Black Rose Press, 1996; rev. ed. Concordia University Press, 2023.
- Bell, D. G. "Slavery and the Judges of Loyalist New Brunswick." University of New Brunswick Law Journal (2021).
- Harvey, A. D. "Prosecutions for Sodomy in England at the Beginning of the Nineteenth Century." The Historical Journal, vol. 21 (1978): 939–948.
- Cocks, H. "Safeguarding Civility: Sodomy, Class and Moral Reform in Late-Eighteenth-Century England." History Workshop Journal, no. 61 (2006).
- Trumbach, Randolph. "The Transformation of Sodomy from the Renaissance to the Modern World and Its General Sexual Consequences." Journal of the History of Sexuality, vol. 26, no. 1 (2012).
- Pilarczyk, Ian C. "Family Violence and the Law in Montreal, 1825–1850." Law and History Review (2010s).
- Crompton, Louis. "Homosexuals and the Death Penalty in Colonial America." Journal of Homosexuality, vol. 1, no. 1 (1976): 277–293.
- "CHIPMAN, WARD (1754–1824)." Dictionary of Canadian Biography, vol. 6.
- "BLISS, JONATHAN." Dictionary of Canadian Biography, vol. 6.
- "LUDLOW, GABRIEL GEORGE." Dictionary of Canadian Biography, vol. 5.
- "LUDLOW, GEORGE DUNCAN." Dictionary of Canadian Biography, vol. 5.
- Chipman Papers (New Brunswick Museum, Hazen Collection, F4A). Depositions, indictments, affidavits, and correspondence related to the 1806 trial.
- Trinity Church Records, Minute Book 1790–1825 (New Brunswick Museum, F43). Record of Smith's appointment as lay reader, March 28, 1805.
- Provincial Archives of New Brunswick (RS-36A). Circuit Court Minute Book 1786–1809, pp. 300–306. Court records and trial proceedings.
- Human Rights Watch. "This Alien Legacy: The Origins of 'Sodomy' Laws in British Colonialism." December 17, 2008.
- London Museum. "Molly Houses & Queer Subculture in Georgian London." Blog post, August 17, 2025.
- University of New Brunswick. "Crime and Punishment" Project, Faculty of Arts.
- Acadiensis Bibliography. "Recent Publications Relating to the History of the Atlantic Region." Acadiensis, vol. 21, no. 2 (1992).
