= Loomer =

Loomer may refer to:

== People ==
- Bernard Loomer (1912–1985), American theologian
- H. Avard Loomer (1915–1969), Canadian municipal politician
- Laura Loomer (born 1993), American political activist, conspiracy theorist, and Internet personality
- Lisa Loomer (born 1950), American playwright and screenwriter
- Lorne Loomer (1937–2017), Canadian rower

== Other uses ==
- Loomer (band), a Canadian band
- "Loomer", a song on the album Loveless by My Bloody Valentine

== See also ==
- George W. Loomer House, Detroit, Michigan
- Loomer Road Stadium, Chesterton, Staffordshire
