= James E. Calvin =

Canadian-American politician (1921–1982)

67th Mayor of Saint John, New Brunswick
- In office October 7, 1969 – 1971
- Preceded by: H. Avard Loomer
- Succeeded by: Bob Lockhart

Personal details
- Born: James Eldon Calvin; June 13, 1921 Fairville, New Brunswick
- Died: July 13, 1982 (aged 61) Saint John, New Brunswick
- Education: New England Institute of Anatomy and Embalming

James Eldon Calvin (June 13, 1921 – July 13, 1982) was a Canadian-American embalmer, funeral director, and politician who served as the mayor of Saint John, New Brunswick from 1969 to 1971. Prior to his tenure, he operated a funeral home in Massachusetts and later in New Brunswick.

== Life and career ==
James Eldon Calvin was born on June 13, 1921, in Fairville, New Brunswick, to parents Joseph Martin Calvin and Laura Belle Clayton. As a child, Calvin moved to Massachusetts where he was educated in the Malden area. He pursued higher education at the New England Institute of Anatomy and Embalming in Boston. After graduating in 1942, Calvin worked professionally as a registered embalmer and a licensed funeral director, operating a funeral home in Reading, Massachusetts for 17 years. During his time in Reading, Calvin also served on the board of public works.

In 1960, Calvin moved back to Saint John where he and his cousin, John E. Calvin, acquired the Ross Funeral Home in Lancaster. He was elected president of the Saint John Rotary Club in 1967.

=== Mayor of Saint John ===
In 1969, a by-election for Saint John's mayoral position was called following H. Avard Loomer's death in office. Calvin, who had considered running in the last election but decided against it, chose to run for mayor on September 10, 1969. During his campaign, Calvin described the city as being in its most "crucial time", identifying housing as a major issue caused by the "fast pace of urban redevelopment and construction of the Saint John Harbour Bridge-Throughway Complex".

The by-election was held on October 6; Calvin won the race with 8,958 votes against six other candidates including Member of Legislative Assembly Donald D. Patterson. He was sworn in the following day on October 7.

== Personal life and death ==
Calvin was married to Elizabeth Farmer, with whom he had two children. He died on July 13, 1982, at the age of 61. (Note: Calvin's obituary incorrectly gives an age of 60 years. Based on his official date of birth, he would have been 61 years old.)
