= John Robinson (businessman) =

Canadian politician

3rd Mayor of Saint John, New Brunswick
- In office 1816 – October 8, 1828
- Preceded by: William Campbell
- Succeeded by: William Black

Personal details
- Born: 1762 near New York City
- Died: October 8, 1828 (aged 65–66) Saint John, Colony of New Brunswick
- Parent(s): Beverley Robinson (father); Susanna Philipse (mother)

John Robinson (1762 – October 8, 1828) was a merchant and political figure in the pre-Confederation Province of New Brunswick, Canada. He represented the City of Saint John in the Legislative Assembly of New Brunswick from 1802 to 1809 and from 1810 to 1816.

He was born near New York City, the son of Beverley Robinson and Susanna Philipse. Robinson was the grandson of John Robinson, former administrator for Virginia. At the start of the American Revolution, he enlisted in the Loyal American Regiment, a loyalist regiment organized by his father. Around 1786, he settled in the valley of the Saint John River. Robinson was named sheriff for Queens County. In 1787, he married Elizabeth, the daughter of George Duncan Ludlow. A few years later, he established himself as a merchant in Saint John. Robinson did not run for reelection in 1809 but was elected to the legislative assembly in an 1810 by-election. He served as acting deputy paymaster general during the War of 1812. He was chosen as speaker for the assembly in 1813 following the death of Amos Botsford and served until 1816 when he was named provincial treasurer. In the same year, he was named mayor of Saint John. In 1818, he was named to the New Brunswick Legislative Council. In 1820, he was named to the board of directors for the new Bank of New Brunswick and became president. Robinson resigned from the Council in 1826 but continued as mayor and province treasurer until his death in Saint John in 1828.
