= Thomas Bell (politician, born 1863) =

Canadian politician

Member of Parliament for St. John—Albert
- In office October 1925 – August 1935
- Preceded by: John Babington Baxter
- Succeeded by: William Ryan

Personal details
- Born: 22 November 1863 Saint John, New Brunswick
- Died: 8 December 1945 (aged 82)
- Party: Conservative
- Spouse: Jane Moore
- Profession: lumber merchant, merchant

Thomas Bell (22 November 1863 – 8 December 1945) was a Conservative member of the House of Commons of Canada. He was born in Saint John, New Brunswick, becoming a lumber merchant and merchant.

Bell attended school at Saint John, and later became a member of the Military Hospital Commission in World War I.

He was first elected to Parliament at the St. John—Albert riding in the 1925 general election with fellow Conservative candidate Murray MacLaren. He was re-elected there in 1926 and 1930. After completing the 17th Canadian Parliament, Bell left federal politics and did not seek another term in the 1935 election.

1930 Canadian federal election: Saint John—Rothesay
Party	Candidate	Votes	%	Elected
Conservative	Murray MacLaren	16,454	33.0	✓
Conservative	Thomas Bell	16,395	32.9	✓
Liberal	Allan McAvity	8,595	17.3	
Liberal	William Ryan	8,371	16.8	
Total valid votes		49,815	100.0	

Total Conservative vote: 32,849, or 65.9% of the total, an increase of 4.2% from the 1926 general election.
Total Liberal vote: 16,966, or 34.1%, a decrease of 4.2% from the 1926 general election.

1926 Canadian federal election: St. John—Albert
Party	Candidate	Votes	%	Elected
Conservative	Murray MacLaren	12,441	31.0	✓
Conservative	Thomas Bell	12,310	30.7	✓
Liberal	William Michael Ryan	8,007	20.0	
Liberal	Robert Thomas Hayes	7,356	18.3	
Total valid votes		40,114	100.0%	

Total Conservative vote: 24,751, or 61.7% of the total, a decrease of 0.2% from the 1925 general election.
Total Liberal vote: 15,363, or 38.3% of the total, an increase of 0.2% from the 1925 general election.

1925 Canadian federal election: St. John—Albert
Party	Candidate	Votes	%	Elected
Conservative	Murray MacLaren	14,623	31.3	✓
Conservative	Thomas Bell	14,250	30.5	✓
Liberal	Walter Edward Foster	9,348	20.0	
Liberal	Robert Thomas Hayes	8,435	18.1	
Total valid votes		46,656	100.0	

Total Conservative vote: 28,873, or 61.9% of the total, an increase of 11.6% from the 1921 general election.
Total Liberal vote: 17,783, or 38.1% of the total, a decrease of 6.7% from the 1921 general election.
