= Bob Lockhart =

Canadian politician

68th Mayor of Saint John, New Brunswick
- In office 1971–1974
- Preceded by: James E. Calvin
- Succeeded by: Edis A. Flewwelling

71st Mayor of Saint John, New Brunswick
- In office 1980–1983
- Preceded by: Samuel Davis
- Succeeded by: Elsie Wayne

Personal details
- Born: Arthur Robert William Lockhart; 1931 Pictou, Nova Scotia
- Died: June 18, 2023 (aged 91–92) Fredericton, New Brunswick

Arthur Robert William Lockhart (1931 – June 18, 2023) was a Canadian municipal politician who served as mayor of Saint John, New Brunswick from 1971 to 1974 and again from 1980 to 1983.

Lockhart was born in 1931, in Pictou, Nova Scotia. Prior to his election to the mayoralty, Lockhart worked in media as a reporter, manager, and proprietor of radio stations in the Saint John area, including CFBC and CFBC-FM. He also served as a director of Broadcast News, and as a regional director of the Canadian Association of Broadcasters.

Lockhart received the Lions Club International Medal of Merit in 1969, as well as the Canadian Peacekeeping Service Medal for serving in Cyprus. In 2007, Lockhart was inducted into the Canadian Broadcast Hall of Fame.

Lockhart died on June 18, 2023, in Fredericton.
