= Rupert Wilson Wigmore =

Canadian politician

The Hon. Rupert Wilson Wigmore
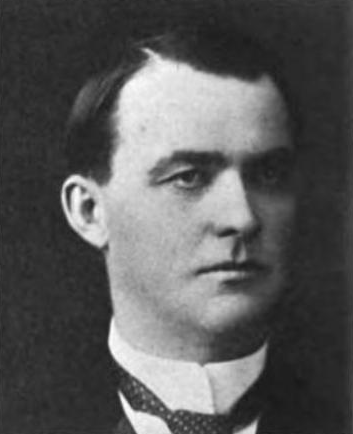

Member of the Canadian Parliament for St. John—Albert
- In office 1917–1921
- Preceded by: Electoral district was created in 1914
- Succeeded by: John Babington Baxter

Personal details
- Born: May 10, 1873 Saint John, New Brunswick
- Died: April 3, 1939 (aged 65)
- Party: Conservative
- Cabinet: Minister of Customs and Inland Revenue (1920-1921); Minister of Customs and Excise (1921)

Rupert Wilson Wigmore, PC (May 10, 1873 – April 3, 1939) was a Canadian politician.

Born in Saint John, New Brunswick, he was a civil engineer before being elected to the House of Commons of Canada representing St. John--Albert in the 1917 federal election. A Unionist and later Conservative, he was Minister of Customs and Inland Revenue and Minister of Customs and Excise.
