= William Ryan (Canadian politician) =

Canadian politician (1887–1938)

Member of Parliament for St. John—Albert
- In office October 1935 – January 1938
- Preceded by: Murray MacLaren
- Succeeded by: Allan McAvity

Personal details
- Born: William Michael Ryan; 22 November 1887 Saint John, New Brunswick, Canada
- Died: 4 January 1938 (aged 50) Saint John, New Brunswick, Canada
- Party: Liberal
- Spouse(s): Mary Alice Duston m. 12 June 1918
- Profession: barrister, journalist

William Michael Ryan (22 November 1887 – 4 January 1938) was a Liberal party member of the House of Commons of Canada. He was born in Saint John, New Brunswick and became a barrister and journalist.

Ryan attended University of St. Joseph's College where he earned a Master of Arts degree, then King College Law School where he earned a Bachelor of Civil Law. He became a journalist for New Brunswick newspaper the Telegraph-Journal and Regina Leader.

He was first elected to Parliament at the St. John—Albert riding in the 1935 general election after unsuccessful campaigns there in 1926 and 1930. Ryan died in Saint John on 4 January 1938 before completing his term in the 18th Canadian Parliament, on the same day that another House of Commons member, George Perley, died.

1935 Canadian federal election: Saint John—Rothesay
Party	Candidate	Votes	%	±%
Liberal	William Ryan	15,125	48.0	+13.9
Conservative	Douglas King Hazen	11,643	36.9	-19.0
Reconstruction	Paul Cross	4,094	13.0	
Independent Liberal	Howe Cowan	672	2.1	
Total valid votes		31,534	100.0	

Note: popular vote is compared to the party's total share of the popular vote in the 1930 general election.

1930 Canadian federal election: Saint John—Rothesay
Party	Candidate	Votes	%	Elected
Conservative	Murray MacLaren	16,454	33.0	✓
Conservative	Thomas Bell	16,395	32.9	✓
Liberal	Allan McAvity	8,595	17.3	
Liberal	William Ryan	8,371	16.8	
Total valid votes		49,815	100.0	

Total Conservative vote: 32,849, or 65.9% of the total, an increase of 4.2% from the 1926 general election.
Total Liberal vote: 16,966, or 34.1%, a decrease of 4.2% from the 1926 general election.

1926 Canadian federal election: St. John—Albert
Party	Candidate	Votes	%	Elected
Conservative	Murray MacLaren	12,441	31.0	✓
Conservative	Thomas Bell	12,310	30.7	✓
Liberal	William Michael Ryan	8,007	20.0	
Liberal	Robert Thomas Hayes	7,356	18.3	
Total valid votes		40,114	100.0%	

Total Conservative vote: 24,751, or 61.7% of the total, a decrease of 0.2% from the 1925 general election.
Total Liberal vote: 15,363, or 38.3% of the total, an increase of 0.2% from the 1925 general election.

== See also ==
- Politics of Canada
