= King Hazen =

Canadian politician

Member of Parliament for St. John—Albert
- In office March 1940 – June 1949
- Preceded by: Allan McAvity
- Succeeded by: Daniel Aloysius Riley

Personal details
- Born: Douglas King Hazen; 30 September 1885 Fredericton, New Brunswick, Canada
- Died: 4 July 1974 (aged 88)
- Party: National Government; Progressive Conservative
- Profession: barrister

King Hazen (30 September 1885 – 4 July 1974) was a Progressive Conservative party and National Government member of the House of Commons of Canada. He was born in Fredericton, New Brunswick and became a barrister by career.

He was first elected to Parliament under the National Government (Conservative) party banner at the St. John—Albert riding in the 1940 general election after an unsuccessful campaign there as a Conservative in 1935. He was re-elected in 1945 as a Progressive Conservative for another term then defeated in the 1949 election by Daniel Aloysius Riley of the Liberal party.

== Electoral record ==
1949 Canadian federal election: Saint John—Rothesay
| Party | Candidate | Votes | % | ±% |
|---|---|---|---|---|
| Liberal | Daniel Riley | 18,691 | 48.9 | +7.8 |
| Progressive Conservative | King Hazen | 17,052 | 44.7 | -2.1 |
| Co-operative Commonwealth | Raymond McAfee | 2,445 | 6.4 | -5.6 |
| Total valid votes | | 38,188 | 100.0 | |

1945 Canadian federal election: Saint John—Rothesay
| Party | Candidate | Votes | % | ±% |
|---|---|---|---|---|
| Progressive Conservative | King Hazen | 16,205 | 46.8 | -3.5 |
| Liberal | David Lawrence MacLaren | 14,248 | 41.1 | -6.1 |
| Co-operative Commonwealth | William Arrowsmith | 761 | 12.0 | +9.5 |
| Total valid votes | | 31,214 | 100.0 | |

1940 Canadian federal election: Saint John—Rothesay
| Party | Candidate | Votes | % | ±% |
|---|---|---|---|---|
| National Government | King Hazen | 15,110 | 50.3 | +13.4 |
| Liberal | Allan McAvity | 14,197 | 47.2 | -0.8 |
| Co-operative Commonwealth | James Fritch | 761 | 2.5 | +2.5 |
| Total valid votes | | 30,068 | 100.0 | |

Note: popular vote is compared to 1935 general election.
