= Edis A. Flewwelling =

Canadian politician (1918–2006)

69th Mayor of Saint John, New Brunswick
- In office June 24, 1974 – 1977
- Preceded by: Bob Lockhart
- Succeeded by: Samuel Davis

Personal details
- Born: Edis Armstrong Flewwelling; February 5, 1918 Clifton, Kings County, New Brunswick
- Died: July 18, 2006 (aged 88) Saint John, New Brunswick
- Spouses: Mary Elizabeth Knowlton (died) Jane McKenna de Kruyff (before 2006)
- Children: 3

Military service
- Years of service: 1941 - 1968
- Rank: Major

Edis Armstrong Flewwelling (February 5, 1918 – 2006) was a Canadian municipal politician who served as the mayor of Saint John, New Brunswick from 1974 to 1977.

== Life and career ==
Edis Armstrong Flewwelling was born in Clifton, Kings County, New Brunswick on February 5, 1918, to parents Edis Hamilton Flewwelling and Hazel Marguerite Wetmore. He served in the Canadian Armed Forces for 27 years, retiring in 1968 as a Major.

In 1974, Flewwelling challenged against the incumbent Bob Lockhart to become elected as the mayor of Saint John. The municipal election for Saint John was held on June 10, 1974; the mayoralty race ended with Flewwelling in the lead and Lockhart conceding defeat during vote tallying. He was sworn in on June 24, 1974, during which he outlined a 14-point program of reform and re-organization. Among his proposals included the reactivation of Saint John's Housing Commission and Urban Renewal Commission. He was succeeded by Samuel Davis in 1977 after being defeated in the mayoralty race on May 9, 1977.

Flewwelling additionally served as the managing director of Lonewater Farm, an alcohol rehabilitation center in Westfield. On November 10, 1977, Lonewater Farm was raided by the RCMP, prompting the suspension of Flewwelling from his position. Later that year, Flewwelling was charged with theft by the RCMP, who alleged that from July 31 to August 5, 1977, Flewwelling "unlawfully commit[ted] theft of $562.50 property of the Province of New Brunswick". He was additionally charged with "intent to defraud the provincial government by altering a Lonewater Farm accounts receivable ledger between May 31 and June 9, 1977". Flewwelling was acquitted of both charges in May 1978.

== Personal life ==
Flewwelling first married Mary Elizabeth Knowlton on June 5, 1946; she predeceased him. He later remarried Jane McKenna de Kruyff. He had three sons. Flewwelling died at the Saint John Regional Hospital on September 20, 2006, at the age of 88.
