= Eric Ferguson (politician) =

Canadian politician

Eric W. Ferguson (31 December 1930 – 23 September 2006) was a Progressive Conservative party member of the House of Commons of Canada. He was born in Tangier, Nova Scotia and became a police officer and consultant by career.

He represented the Saint John electoral district since winning that seat in the 1979 federal election. After serving in the 31st Canadian Parliament, Ferguson was defeated in the 1980 election by Mike Landers of the Liberal party.

1980 Canadian federal election: Saint John—Rothesay
Party	Candidate	Votes	%	±%
Liberal	Mike Landers	13,122	41.4	+1.8
Progressive Conservative	Eric Ferguson	12,363	39.0	-2.6
New Democratic	David M. Brown	5,978	18.9	+0.0
Independent	Marilynn Fox	103	0.3	-
Libertarian	Peter Jones	66	0.2	-
Marxist–Leninist	Gilles DesRosiers	35	0.1	-
Total valid votes		31,667	100.0	
lop.parl.ca

1979 Canadian federal election: Saint John—Rothesay
Party	Candidate	Votes	%	±%
Progressive Conservative	Eric Ferguson	13,989	41.6	+0.6
Liberal	Mike Landers	13,316	39.6	-6.5
New Democratic	Eldon Richardson	6,358	18.9	+6.5
Total valid votes		33,663	100.0	
