= James D. McKenna =

Canadian newspaperman and politician

Member of the New Brunswick Legislative Assembly for Kings
- In office 1922–1925

54th Mayor of Saint John, New Brunswick
- In office 1944–1948
- Preceded by: Charles R. Wasson
- Succeeded by: Ernest W. Patterson

Personal details
- Born: James Daly McKenna; October 10, 1874; Dartmouth, Nova Scotia
- Died: April 16, 1949 (aged 74); Saint John, New Brunswick
- Political party: Liberal
- Spouses: Nellie McGivern (m. 1902) Margaret E. R. Archibald (m. 1919)

James Daly McKenna (October 10, 1874 – March 16, 1949) was a Canadian newspaperman as well as a provincial and municipal politician. Originally based from Dartmouth, Nova Scotia, McKenna later moved to Sussex in New Brunswick to run the newspaper publisher now known as the Kings County Record, additionally serving as the town's mayor. He additionally served as a Member of the Legislative Assembly of New Brunswick as a member of the Liberal party. McKenna later moved to Saint John, where he would serve as mayor between 1944 and 1948.

== Life and career ==
James Daly McKenna was born on October 10, 1874, in Dartmouth, Nova Scotia, to parents Peter and Elizabeth (née Thomas) McKenna. His family was Roman Catholic. After graduating from public school, McKenna began his career as a newspaperman and established the Dartmouth newspaper Atlantic Weekly in 1893. Upon the establishment of Sussex, New Brunswick in 1904, McKenna moved there and purchased the publisher which would later be known as the Kings County Record after renaming it. McKenna entered municipal politics, becoming the mayor of Sussex in the 1920s, and later served as a Liberal Member of the Legislative Assembly (MLA) in the Kings district between 1922 and 1925. Additionally, he began serving as the New Brunswick Publishing Company's president in 1923. At the time, the company oversaw multiple local newspapers including the Telegraph-Journal. McKenna later moved to Saint John, serving as its mayor between 1944 and 1948.

== Personal life ==
On September 23, 1902, McKenna became married with Nellie McGivern. He later married a second time in Albert County with Margaret E. R. Archibald, on August 2, 1919. On March 16, 1949, McKenna died at his home in Saint John, at the age of 74.
