= Allan McAvity =

Canadian politician (1882–1944)

Member of Parliament for St. John—Albert
- In office February 1938 – March 1940
- Preceded by: William Ryan
- Succeeded by: King Hazen

Personal details
- Born: Allan Getchell McAvity; 9 October 1882 Saint John, New Brunswick, Canada
- Died: 24 June 1944 (aged 61)
- Party: Liberal
- Spouse(s): Amy Fellows Adams m. 31 August 1905
- Profession: engineer, merchant

Allan Getchell McAvity (9 October 1882 – 24 June 1944) was a Liberal party member of the House of Commons of Canada. He was born in Saint John, New Brunswick and became an engineer and merchant.

McAvity attended Rothesay Collegiate then Harvard University where he earned an SB degree.

He was first elected to Parliament at the St. John—Albert riding in a by-election on 21 February 1938, after a previous unsuccessful attempt to win the riding in the 1930 election. After serving the remaining months of the 18th Canadian Parliament, McAvity was defeated in the 1940 election by King Hazen of the Conservative party.

== Electoral history ==
1940 Canadian federal election: Saint John—Rothesay
Party	Candidate	Votes	%	±%
National Government	King Hazen	15,110	50.3	+13.4
Liberal	Allan McAvity	14,197	47.2	-0.8
Co-operative Commonwealth	James Fritch	761	2.5	+2.5
Total valid votes		30,068	100.0	

Note: popular vote is compared to 1935 general election.

By-election on 21 February 1938 On William Ryan's death, 1 April 1938
Party	Candidate	Votes
Liberal	Allan McAvity	acclaimed
