= Daniel Aloysius Riley =

Canadian politician (1916–1984)

The Honourable Daniel Aloysius Riley
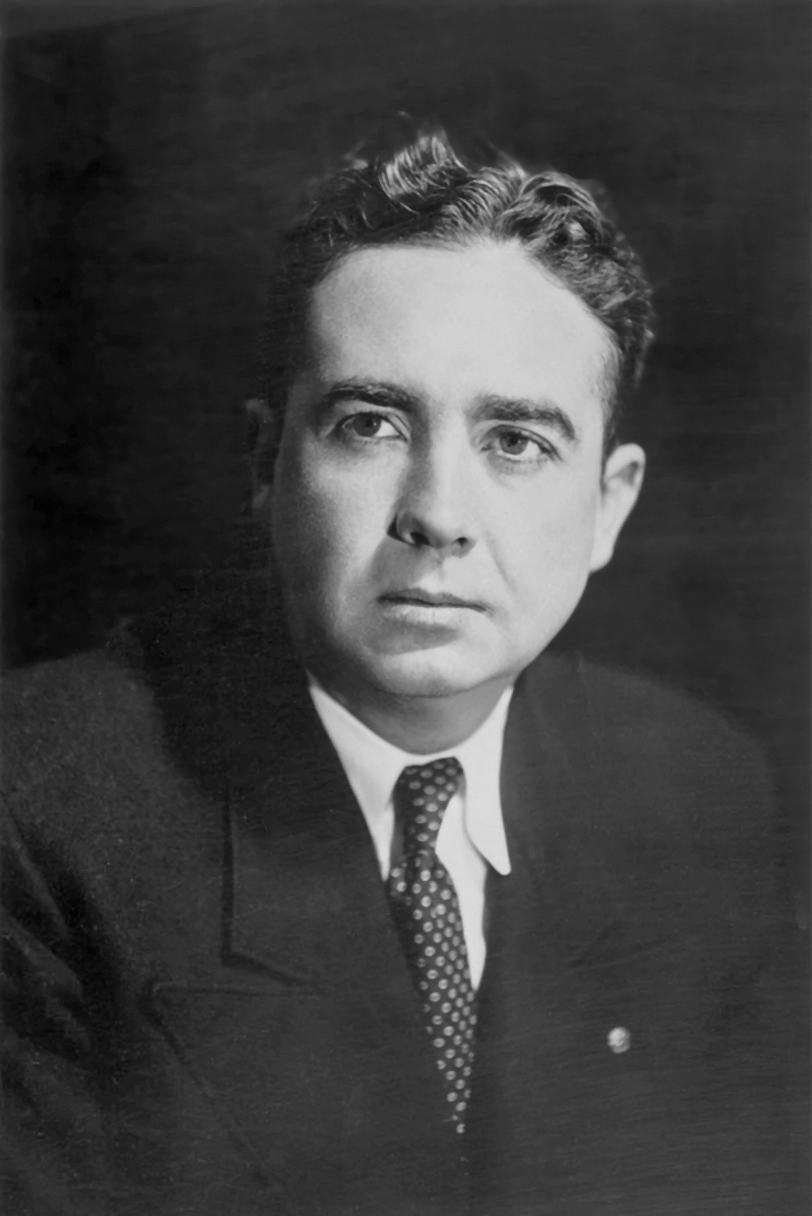

Senator for Saint John, New Brunswick
- In office 21 December 1973 – 13 September 1984
- Nominated by: Pierre Trudeau

Member of the Canadian Parliament for St. John—Albert
- In office 27 June 1949 – 9 August 1953
- Preceded by: King Hazen
- Succeeded by: Thomas Miller Bell

Member of the New Brunswick Legislature for Saint John City
- In office 22 April 1963 – 1967

Personal details
- Born: 11 May 1916 Charlottetown, Prince Edward Island
- Died: 13 September 1984 (aged 68)
- Party: Liberal
- Occupation: Politician; barrister

Daniel Aloysius Riley (11 May 1916 – 13 September 1984) was a Canadian politician.

== Early life ==
Born in Charlottetown, Prince Edward Island, he received a Bachelor of Civil Law degree from the University of New Brunswick in 1940.

== Career ==
In 1949, he was elected to the House of Commons of Canada for the New Brunswick riding of St. John—Albert. A Liberal, he was defeated in the 1953 election and again in the 1957 election.

In 1963, he was elected to the Legislative Assembly of New Brunswick and was the Liberal Minister of Lands and Forests in the Louis Robichaud cabinet. He resigned in 1966 and was appointed chairman of the New Brunswick Motor Carrier Board and Public Utilities Commission. He was summoned to the Senate of Canada in 1973 representing the senatorial division of Saint John, New Brunswick.

== Death ==
He served until his death in 1984.
