= Mike Landers (politician) =

Canadian politician (born 1943)

Member of Parliament for Saint John—Lancaster
- In office 1974–1979
- Preceded by: Thomas M. Bell
- Succeeded by: Eric Ferguson

Member of Parliament for Saint John
- In office 1980–1984
- Preceded by: Eric Ferguson
- Succeeded by: Gerald Merrithew

Personal details
- Born: 27 April 1943 (age 82) Saint John, New Brunswick
- Party: Liberal
- Profession: Chemical dependency counsellor, lawyer

Mike Landers (born 27 April 1943 in Saint John, New Brunswick) was a Liberal party member of the House of Commons of Canada. He was a lawyer and addiction counsellor by career.

He won New Brunswick's Saint John—Lancaster electoral district in the 1974 federal election and served in the 30th Canadian Parliament. He lost the following election in 1979 to Eric Ferguson of the Progressive Conservative party, but regained the seat within months in the 1980 federal election.

Landers left politics after serving in the 30th and 32nd Canadian Parliaments and became a Commissioner with the Canadian Transport Commission from 1984 to 1987.

1980 Canadian federal election: Saint John—Rothesay
| Party | Candidate | Votes | % | ±% |
|---|---|---|---|---|
| Liberal | Mike Landers | 13,122 | 41.4 | +1.8 |
| Progressive Conservative | Eric Ferguson | 12,363 | 39.0 | -2.6 |
| New Democratic | David M. Brown | 5,978 | 18.9 | +0.0 |
| Independent | Marilynn Fox | 103 | 0.3 | - |
| Libertarian | Peter Jones | 66 | 0.2 | - |
| Marxist–Leninist | Gilles DesRosiers | 35 | 0.1 | - |
| Total valid votes | | 31,667 | 100.0 | |
lop.parl.ca

1979 Canadian federal election: Saint John—Rothesay
| Party | Candidate | Votes | % | ±% |
|---|---|---|---|---|
| Progressive Conservative | Eric Ferguson | 13,989 | 41.6 | +0.6 |
| Liberal | Mike Landers | 13,316 | 39.6 | -6.5 |
| New Democratic | Eldon Richardson | 6,358 | 18.9 | +6.5 |
| Total valid votes | | 33,663 | 100.0 | |
