= Murray MacLaren =

Canadian politician

The Honourable Murray MacLaren PC CMG FACS

Member of the Canadian Parliament for St. John—Albert
- In office 6 December 1921 – 31 January 1935 Serving with John B. M. Baxter
- Preceded by: Stanley Edward Elkin
- Succeeded by: William Ryan

18th Lieutenant Governor of New Brunswick
- In office 31 January 1935 – 5 March 1940
- Monarchs: George V Edward VIII; George VI
- Governors General: The Earl of Bessborough; The Lord Tweedsmuir
- Premier: Leonard P. D. Tilley; Allison Dysart
- Preceded by: Hugh Havelock McLean
- Succeeded by: William George Clark ⋅

Personal details
- Born: 30 April 1861 Richibucto, New Brunswick, Canada
- Died: 24 December 1942 (aged 81) Saint John, New Brunswick, British North America
- Party: Conservative
- Children: 1
- Occupation: Physician
- Profession: Politician
- Military career
- Allegiance: Canada
- Branch: Canadian Expeditionary Force
- Service years: 1914-1916
- Rank: Colonel

Murray MacLaren (30 April 1861 – 24 December 1942) was a Canadian politician, surgeon, and the 18th Lieutenant Governor of New Brunswick.

Born in Richibucto, New Brunswick, he was a physician in the Canadian Army Medical Corps before being elected to the House of Commons of Canada representing the New Brunswick riding of St. John—Albert in the 1921 federal election. A Conservative, he was re-elected in 1925, 1926, and 1930. From 1930 to 1934, he was the Minister of Pensions and National Health. From 1935 to 1940, he was the Lieutenant-Governor of New Brunswick. He died in 1942 in Saint John, New Brunswick.
