= Government House Leader (New Brunswick) =

The Government House Leader for the Province of New Brunswick, Canada is the provincial cabinet minister responsible for planning and managing the government's legislative program in the Legislative Assembly of New Brunswick. The position is not legally entitled to cabinet standing on its own, so all Government House Leaders must simultaneously hold another portfolio (or be specifically designated as a Minister without Portfolio).

The current Government House Leader in New Brunswick is Glen Savoie.

== List of past government house leaders ==
- Mike Murphy 2007–?
- Stuart Jamieson 2006–2007
- Bev Harrison 2006
- Brad Green 1999–2006
- Greg Byrne 1998–1999
- Doug Tyler 1997–1998
- Ray Frenette 1987–1997
- Malcolm MacLeod ?–1987

== See also ==
- Government House Leader for the equivalent position in the federal House of Commons
- House Leader
