= H. Avard Loomer =

Canadian politician (1915–1969)

66th Mayor of Saint John, New Brunswick
- In office June 23, 1969 – July 18, 1969
- Preceded by: Joseph A. Macdougall
- Succeeded by: James E. Calvin

Personal details
- Born: Henry Avard Loomer; August 9, 1915 Stellarton, Nova Scotia
- Died: July 18, 1969 (aged 53) Toronto, Ontario
- Spouse: Irene Stevens Currie
- Children: 1

Henry Avard Loomer (August 9, 1915 – July 18, 1969) was a Canadian manufacturing businessman and municipal politician who served as the mayor of Saint John, New Brunswick, for just 26 days, from June 23 to July 18, 1969, when he died in office.

== Life and career ==
Henry Avard Loomer was born on August 9, 1915, in Stellarton, Nova Scotia to parents Brett Baxter Loomer and Mabel Josephine Potter. He was a graduate from Acadia University. Loomer worked as a liquor manufacturer in Saint John, New Brunswick, serving in a firm for manufacturing agents as its president.

In early June of 1969, Loomer was elected mayor of Saint John after receiving 12,558 votes, defeating the incumbent Joseph A. Macdougall in what was described as an upset in the municipal election. He was sworn into office later that month on June 23. As mayor, he was featured in an article about Saint John's urban renewal project by The New York Times, where he shared an optimistic view on the future of Saint John and its port, being "confident that [Saint John] is in an idea position to attract container shipments." His term in office was short-lived, serving as mayor for only 26 days until his death.

== Personal life ==
On September 27, 1941, Loomer became married to Irene Stevens Curie. At the time, he lived in Saint John. They had one son, who died in 2022.

=== Health and death ===
Loomer had a congenital heart defect (a septal defect between the heart's upper chambers). The condition was first discovered in 1937 during a medical examination for entrance to Acadia University.

On July 18, 1969, Loomer died at the Toronto General Hospital in Toronto, Ontario from a heart attack, two days after being admitted there for a physical examination. His funeral was held in Saint John on July 22 and he was buried at Fernhill Cemetery. Following his death, his office was taken over by then-deputy mayor Arthur L. Gould, until James E. Calvin was elected on October 6, 1969.
