= Saint John General Hospital =

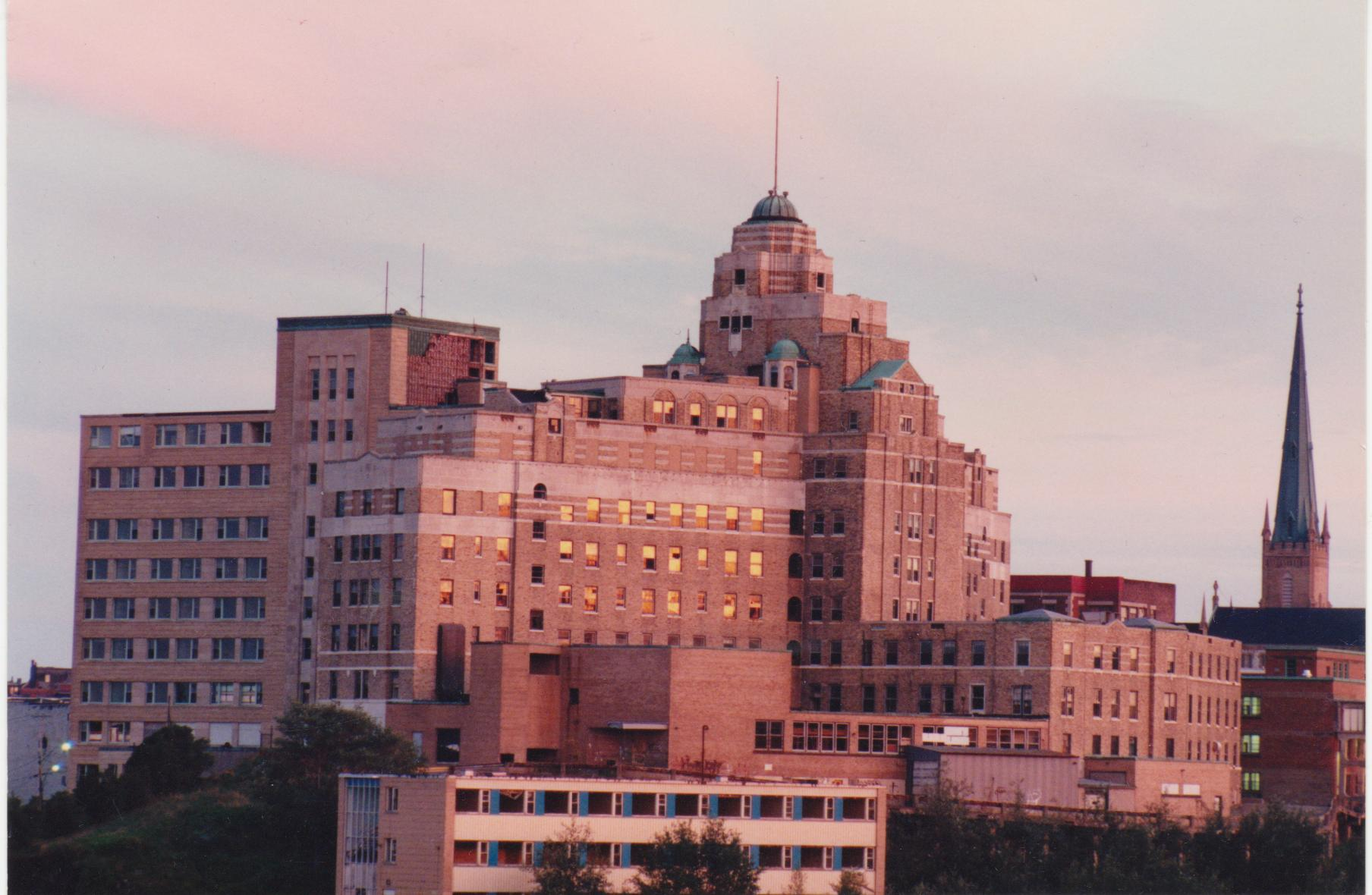
- Saint John General Hospital in 1995

Geography
- Location: Saint John, New Brunswick, Canada
- Coordinates: 45.280969°N 66.055394°W (approximate)

History
- Opened: October 16, 1931
- Closed: October 31, 1982
- Demolished: December 10, 1995

Links
- Lists: Hospitals in Canada

The Saint John General Hospital was a public hospital in Saint John, New Brunswick.

The hospital was completed in 1931 and cost $1.6 million to construct. Its first patients were admitted to the hospital on October 16, 1931. Built on a hill near the center of the city, the 12-storey building, topped with a gleaming metal dome, was a prominent landmark in Saint John's skyline.

The hospital boasted state-of-the-art facilities for its time: in 1932 its new cancer clinic was treating patients with radiation therapy, in 1952 it introduced a neurosurgery department, and in the 1960s it became the first hospital in the region to offer renal dialysis.

The hospital also housed the Bureau of Laboratories that would later become the Provincial Laboratory Service.

The building was expanded in 1959 with the addition of a new wing, but by the late 1970s the facility was dated and many services formerly provided at the General Hospital had moved to newer hospitals. On October 31, 1982, the last patients were moved to other facilities and the hospital officially closed. It remained empty and condemned until December 10, 1995 at 1:30 p.m. (originally scheduled at 8:30 a.m. but it was delayed due to a low cloud cover), when the building was demolished by a controlled implosion.

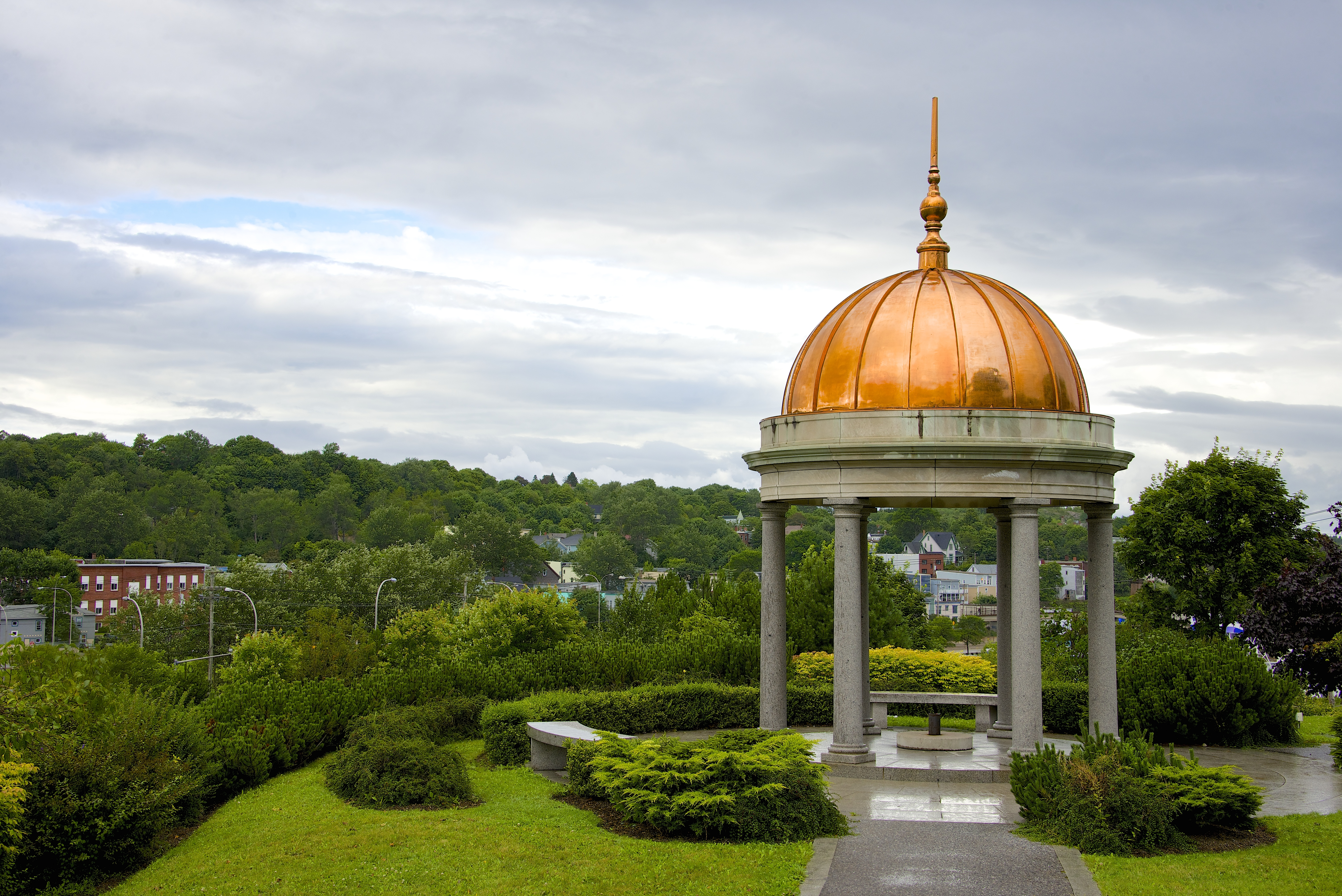

The hospital's dome survived the demolition intact and was pulled from the rubble. It now forms the roof of a gazebo in a small Saint John park, located near Garden Street.
