= Stanley Edward Elkin =

Canadian politician (1880–1960)

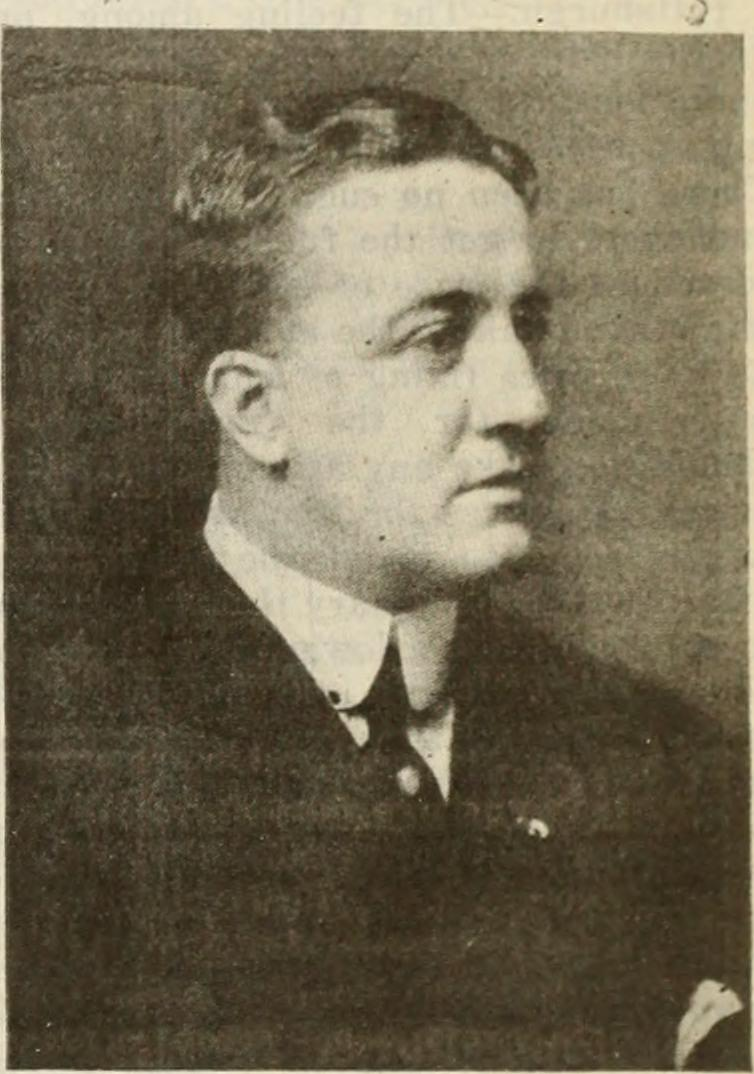

Stanley Edward Elkin (October 12, 1880 – June 9, 1960) was a businessman and political figure in New Brunswick, Canada. He represented St. John—Albert in the House of Commons of Canada from 1917 to 1921 as a Unionist Party member.

He was born in Saint John, New Brunswick, the son of Edward Cardwell Elkin and Sarah Ann Yerxa, and was educated at Mount Allison Academy. In 1900, he was employed with the Dominion Iron and Steel Company. In 1905, he opened his own business. That same year, Elkin married Ethel Wishart Fanjay. He was president of the Motor Car and Equipment Company and vice-president of the Canada Nail and Wire Company. Elkin was also involved in manufacturing and shipbuilding. He died in Hampton Village, New Brunswick at the age of 79.
