= John McNeil Wilmot =

Canadian politician

John Robinson

7th Mayor of Saint John, New Brunswick
- In office 1833–1834
- Preceded by: William Black
- Succeeded by: Benjamin L. Peters

Personal details
- Born: May 3, 1775 Poughkeepsie, New York
- Died: September 7, 1847 (aged 72) Saint John, Colony of New Brunswick
- Spouse: Susannah Harriet Wiggins (m. 1808)
- Relations: Samuel Street (uncle)
- Children: Robert Duncan Wilmot
- Parent(s): Lemuel Wilmot; Elizabeth Street

John McNeil Wilmot (May 3, 1775 – September 7, 1847) was a businessman, judge and political figure in New Brunswick. He represented St. John County in the Legislative Assembly of New Brunswick from 1820 to 1827, and from 1835 to 1842.

He was born in Poughkeepsie, New York, the son of Major Lemuel Wilmot, commander of a company of the Loyal American Regiment, and Elizabeth Street, a sister of Samuel Street. At age 8, John McNeil Wilmot came to New Brunswick in 1783 with his family. He entered the retail business in Fredericton, later moving to Saint John. In 1808, he married Susannah Harriet Wiggins. Wilmot constructed his own wharf in Saint John in 1813. In 1819, he established a company involved in the timber trade. Wilmot helped establish the Commercial Bank of New Brunswick, serving as a director for the bank. He also helped found the New Brunswick Fire Insurance Company and the New Brunswick Mining Company. Wilmot served as a member of the Common Council for Saint John and was a justice in the Inferior Court of Common Pleas and a magistrate in the Saint John County court. In 1833, he was named mayor for Saint John. He died at his estate in Lincoln, New Brunswick.

His son Robert Duncan also served in the provincial assembly and later became a Father of Confederation.
