= 2007 Saint John, New Brunswick ward plebiscite =

9 October 2007
- "Do you want the City to be divided into four wards of approximately equal population with two councillors to be elected by the voters in that ward, and two councillors to be elected at large?"

Results
Choice	Votes	%
Yes	7,570	70.88%
No	3,110	29.12%
Registered voters/turnout		22.7%

On October 9, 2007 the city of Saint John, New Brunswick held a plebiscite on a proposal regarding how its Common Council would be composed in the future. The question asked:

"Do you want the City to be divided into four wards of approximately equal population with two councillors to be elected by the voters in that ward, and two councillors to be elected at large?"

The plebiscite approved the proposal.

== Unofficial results ==
	Results	Percent
Yes	7570	70.9%
No	3110	29.1%
Polls Reporting	64 of 64	100.0%
Voters Turnout	22.7%	(assumes 47,000 eligible voters)

Source: Elections New Brunswick

== Results requirements ==
The results of the plebiscite were to be binding if greater than 60% of the voters approved the proposed mixed ward system. Any result of less than a 60% majority would not have been binding, and would have permitted the Common Council to decide how to proceed.

== Voting dates ==
=== Election day ===
Tuesday, October 9, 2007

=== Advance polls ===
Saturday, September 29, 2007 Monday, October 1, 2007

=== Advance polls at returning office ===
Tuesday, October 2, 2007 Wednesday, October 3, 2007 Thursday, October 4, 2007
