= Gabriel George Ludlow =

American-born military officer and politician (1736–1808)

The Honourable Gabriel George Ludlow
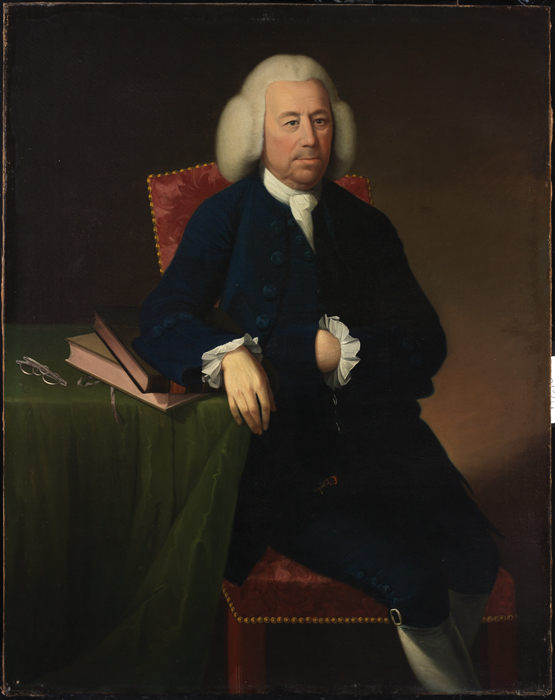
- Portrait by John Singleton Copley

1st Mayor of Saint John, New Brunswick
- In office May 18, 1785 – 1795
- Preceded by: Inaugural holder
- Succeeded by: William Campbell

Personal details
- Born: April 16, 1736 Queens County, Long Island, Province of New York
- Died: February 12, 1808 (aged 71) Saint John, Colony of New Brunswick
- Spouse: Ann Verplanck (m. 1760)
- Relations: George Duncan Ludlow (brother); Gulian Verplanck (brother in-law); Edward Hunter Ludlow (grandson)
- Children: Gabriel Verplanck Ludlow
- Parent(s): Gabriel Ludlow; Frances Duncan Ludlow

Gabriel George Ludlow (April 16, 1736 – February 12, 1808) was an American-born military officer and politician who served as the first mayor of Saint John, New Brunswick.

== Life and career ==
Gabriel George Ludlow was born on April 16, 1736, in Queens County, Long Island, in the Province of New York of then-British America. He was born to merchant Gabriel Ludlow and Frances Frances (née Duncan) Ludlow. Additionally, he was the younger brother of George Duncan Ludlow.

Ludlow served in the 3rd Battalion of the Long Island-based De Lancey's Brigade as a colonel. He later served as a King's College governor as well as a Justice of the peace. Ludlow later arrived in Parrtown with his older brother. On May 18, 1785, upon the incorporation of Saint John following the amalgamation of the Loyalist-created Parrtown and Carleton, Ludlow was sworn into office as its first mayor. According to the Telegraph-Journal, he was additionally the first mayor in Canada.

Ludlow's family, including himself, were firm supporters of slavery and were slaveowners. His father traded slaves, and whilst his older brother, George, was the first Chief Justice of New Brunswick, he also declared slavery, which he practiced, to be legal in the controversial 1799 court case R v Jones.

Ludlow also temporarily served as the acting Lieutenant Governor of New Brunswick.

== Personal life ==
On February 12, 1808, Ludlow married Anne Verplanck, sister of Gulian Verplanck, the Federalist Speaker of the New York State Assembly. They had one son, Gabriel Verplanck Ludlow, the father of Edward Hunter Ludlow. On February 12, 1808, Ludlow died in Saint John at the age of 71, and was buried at the Old Carleton Graveyard in Saint John West along with his wife.
