= Jim Webb (Canadian politician) =

Canadian politician

James Aden "Jim" Webb (January 3, 1926 - October 5, 2013) was one of the founding members of the New Brunswick Confederation of Regions Party, a conservative political party in New Brunswick, Canada.

Webb served as its leader during the 1999 election campaign, and later founded the Grey Party of New Brunswick, serving as its only leader during its brief existence.
