= Saint John Common Council =

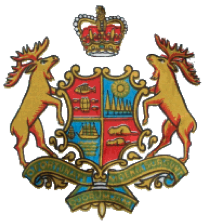

Leadership
- Mayor (head of council): Donna Reardon since June 7, 2021
- Deputy Mayor: John MacKenzie since June 21, 2021

Structure
- Seats: 10 plus Mayor
- Salary: $32,600 (councillor) $88,000 (mayor)

Meeting place
- Council Chamber; Saint John City Hall; Saint John, New Brunswick

Website
- saintjohn.ca/en/city-hall/council-and-committees

Saint John City Council or Saint John Common Council as distinguished by the city's own charter, is the city council for the city of Saint John, New Brunswick, Canada. The council consists of the mayor and ten councillors. In the 2007 Saint John, New Brunswick Ward Plebiscite, it was decided that as of the May 2008 quadrennial municipal elections, the city will be divided into four wards of approximately equal population, with two councillors to be elected by the voters in that ward, and two councillors to be elected at large.

The Common Council consists of:

- The Mayor, who runs at-large, acts as chairman of the board.
- Two at-large Common Councillors.
- Two Common Councillors, from each of the city's four wards.

One is elected by the council to serve as Deputy Mayor.

== Responsibility ==
Saint John is governed by a body of elected officials, referred to as "Common Council", whose responsibilities include:

- Setting the city operational budget
- Setting the City Water utility budget/ rates
- Enacting and amending by-laws
- Rezoning and land-use permissions of properties in Saint John.
- Setting the capital budget for the city
- Acting as the board of directors for the corporation "City of Saint John"
- Appointing persons to city staff and commissions
- Overseeing the operation of city commissions and departments

== Current council ==
The members of Saint John Common Council are listed below in the order of the ward they serve.

| Ward | Council Member | In office since |
|---|---|---|
| 1 | Joanna Killen | 2021 |
| 1 | Greg Norton | 2012 |
| 2 | John MacKenzie; Deputy Mayor | 2012 |
| 2 | Barry Ogden | 2021 |
| 3 | Mariah Darling | 2024 |
| 3 | Gerry Lowe | 2014–2018, 2021 |
| 4 | Paula Radwan | 2021 |
| 4 | Greg Stewart | 2021 |
| At Large | Brent Harris | 2021 |
| At Large | Gary Sullivan | 2008 |

== See also ==
- List of mayors of Saint John, New Brunswick
