= Saint John, New Brunswick =

Saint John
- City
- The City of Saint John (Note: Legal name is The City of Saint John. This is the legal name in both English and French.)
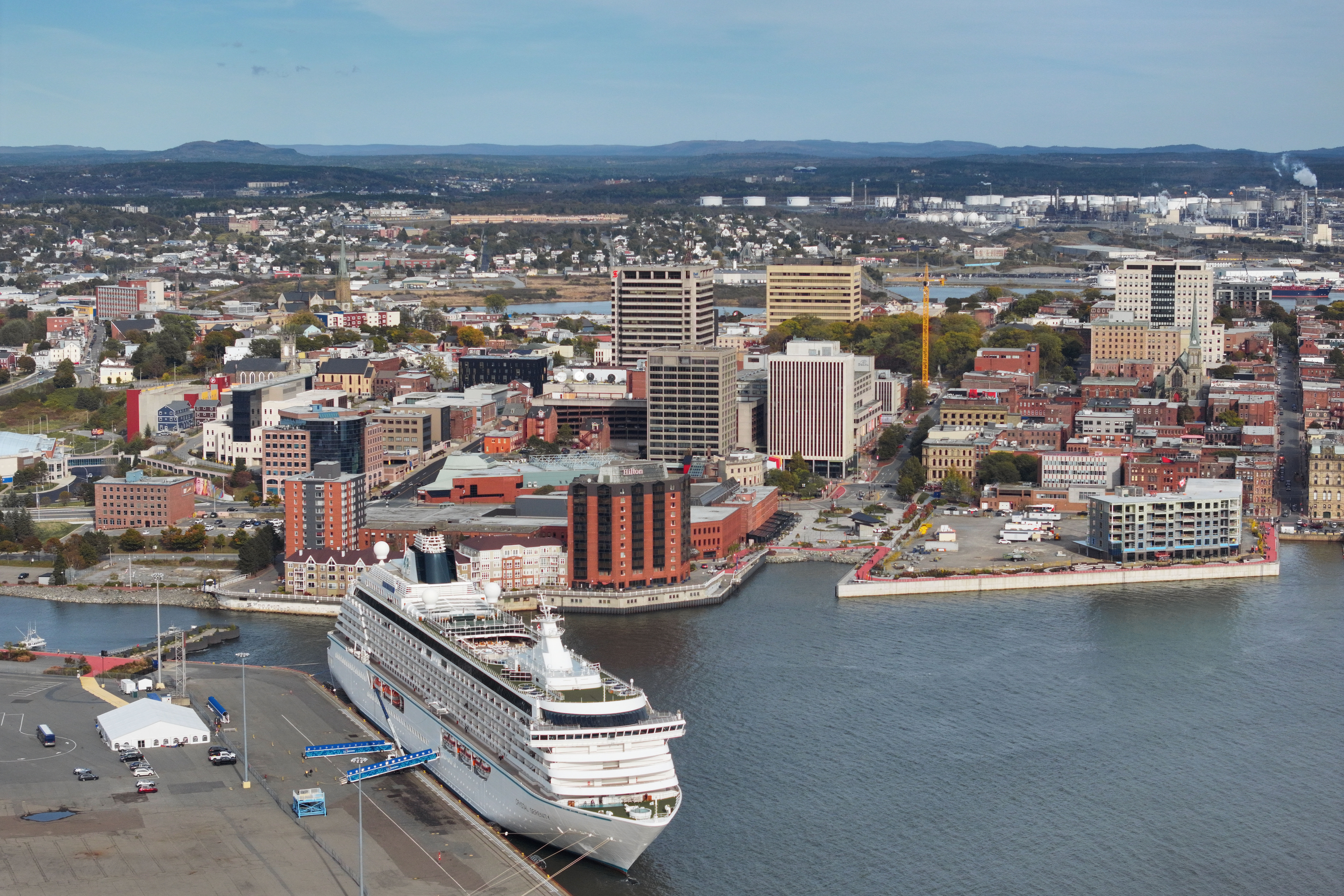
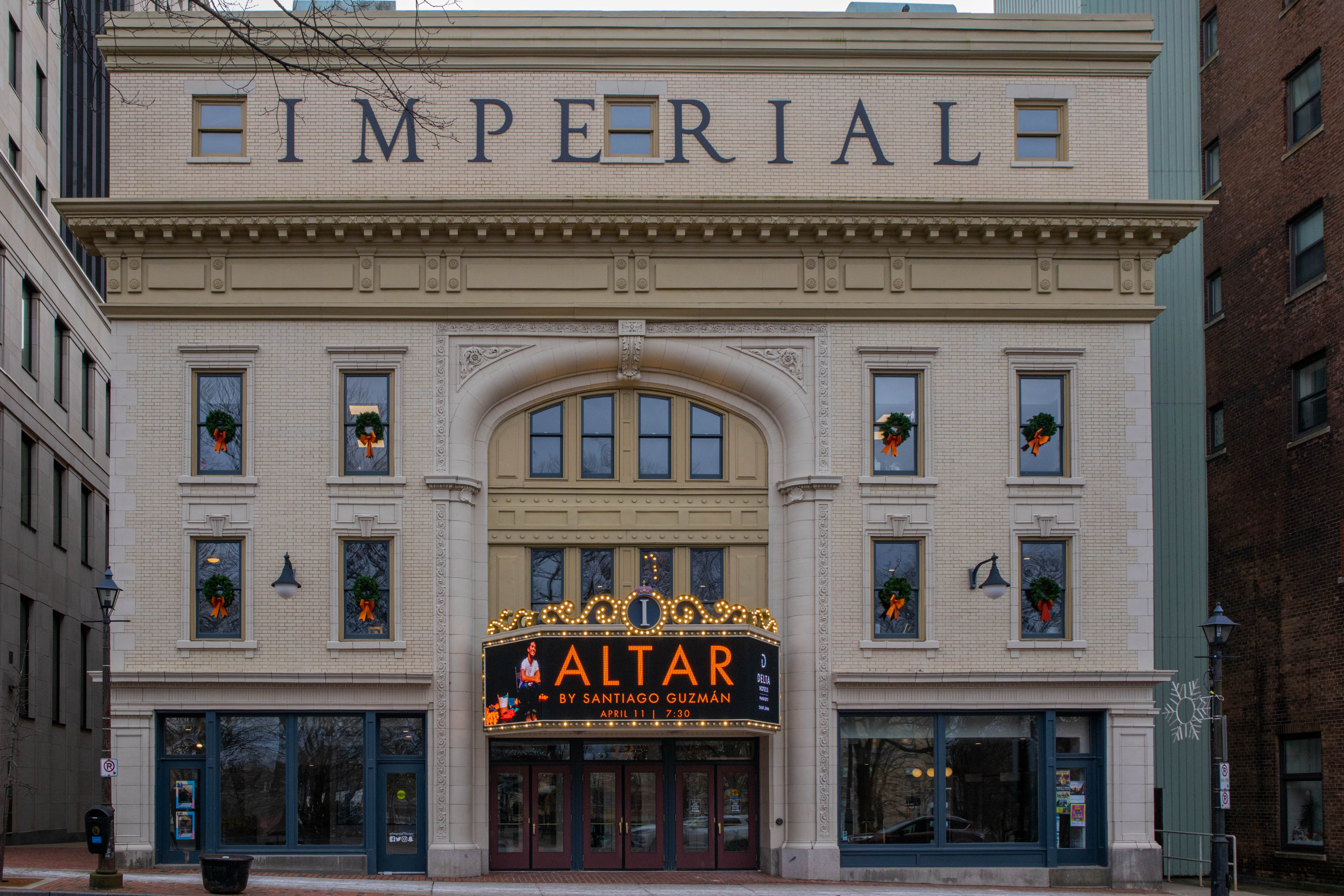
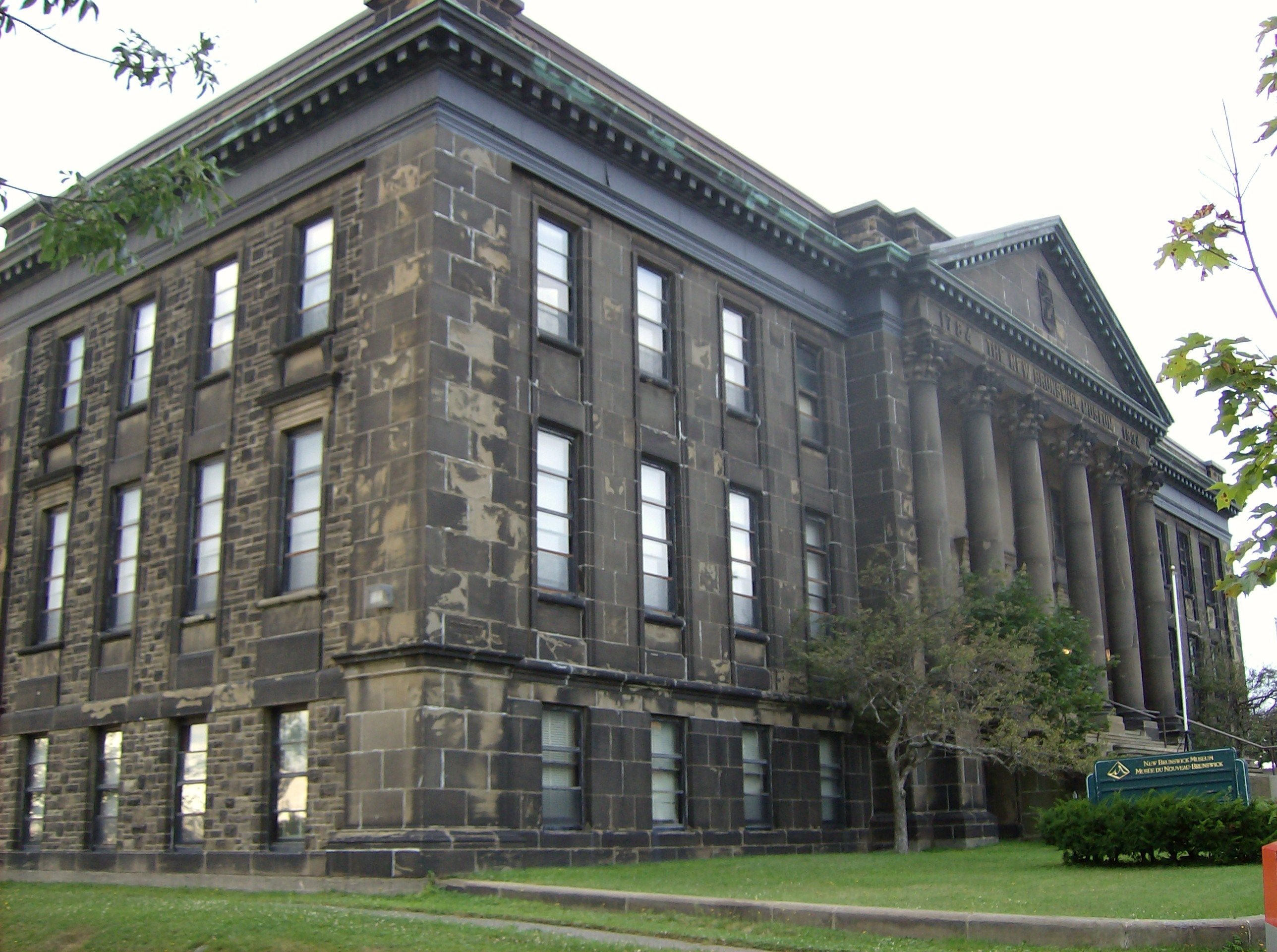
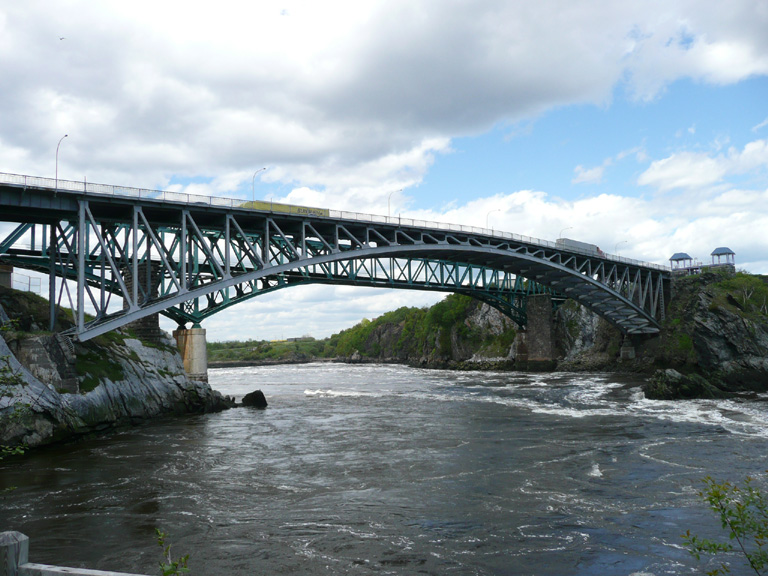
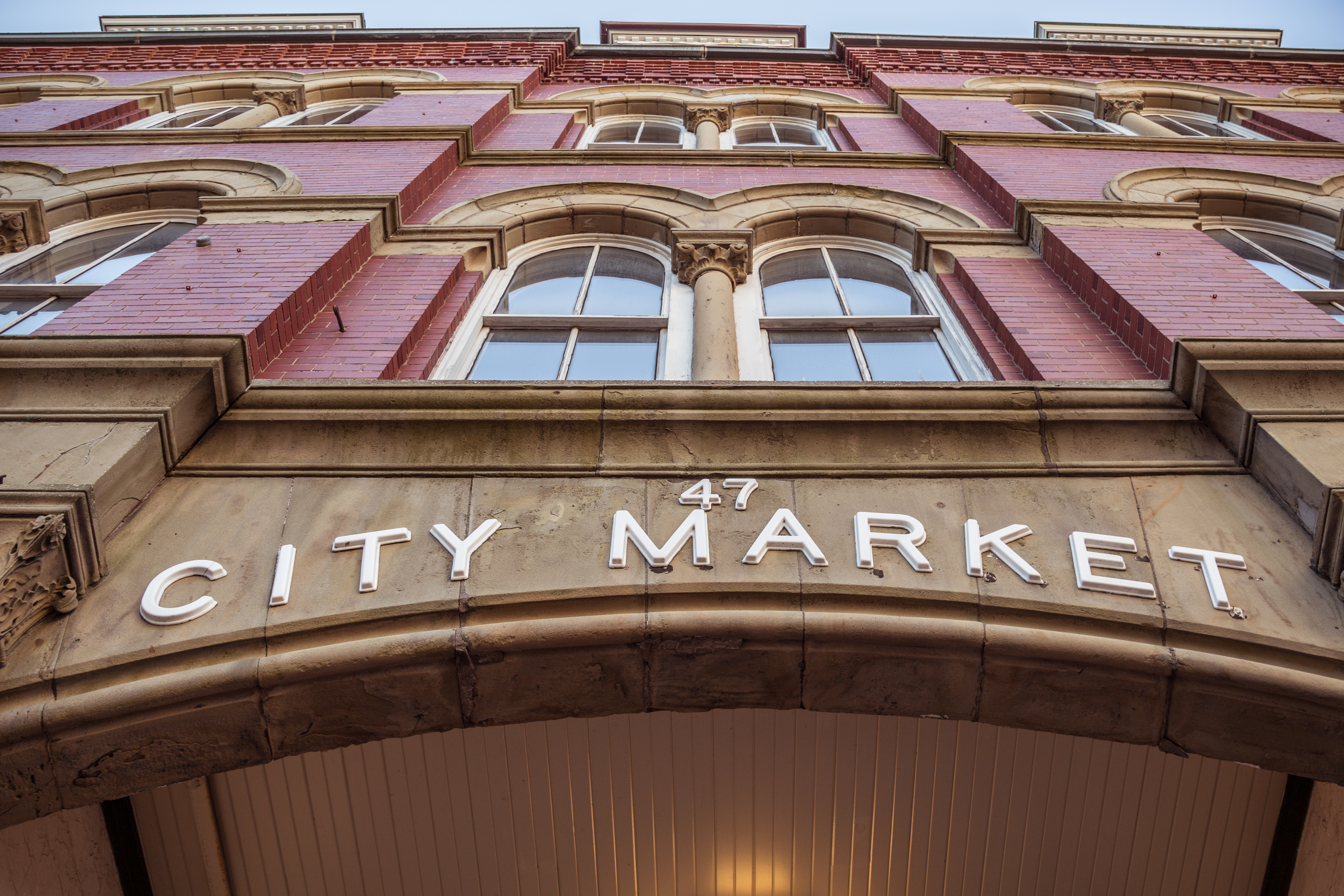
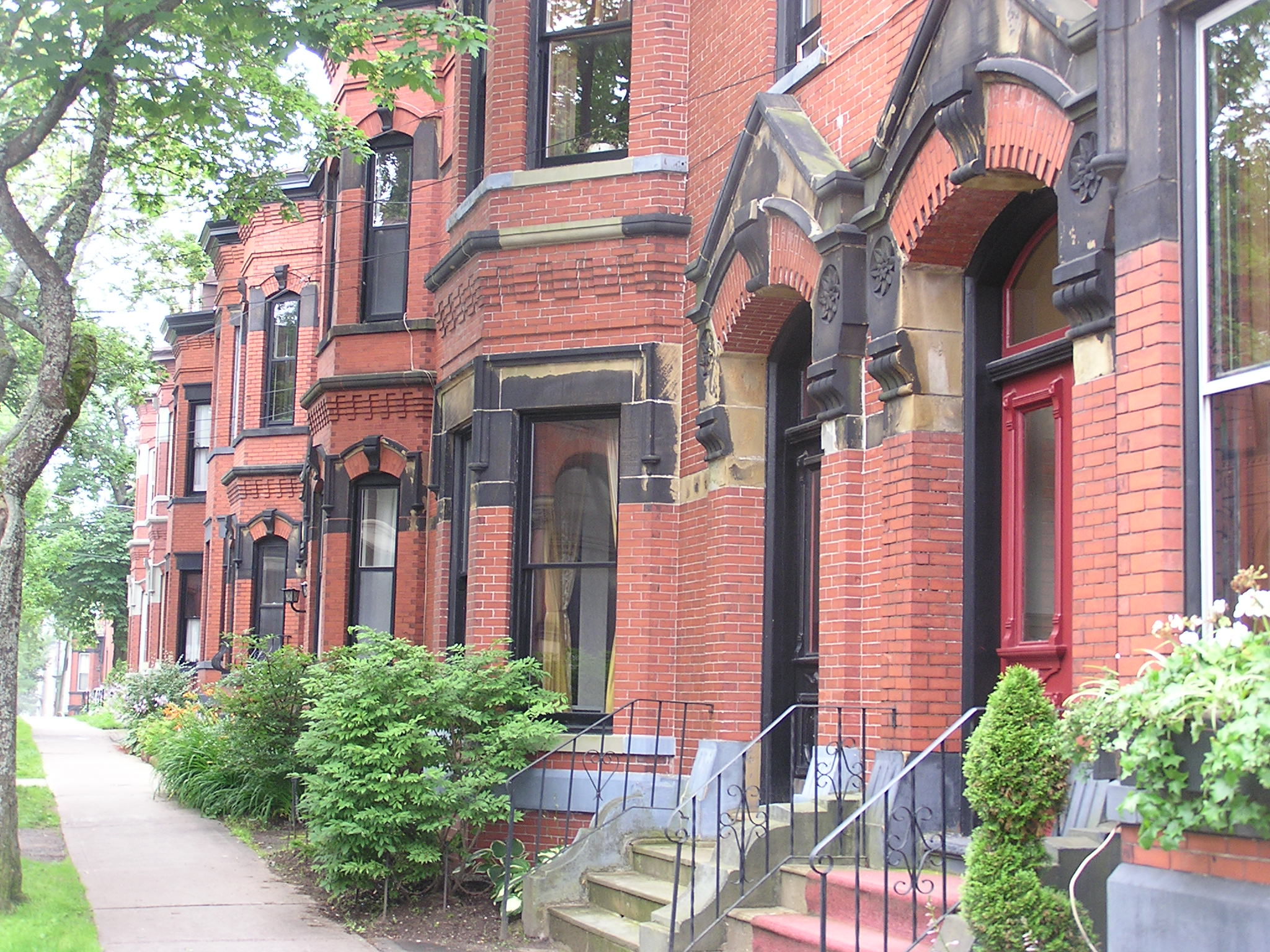
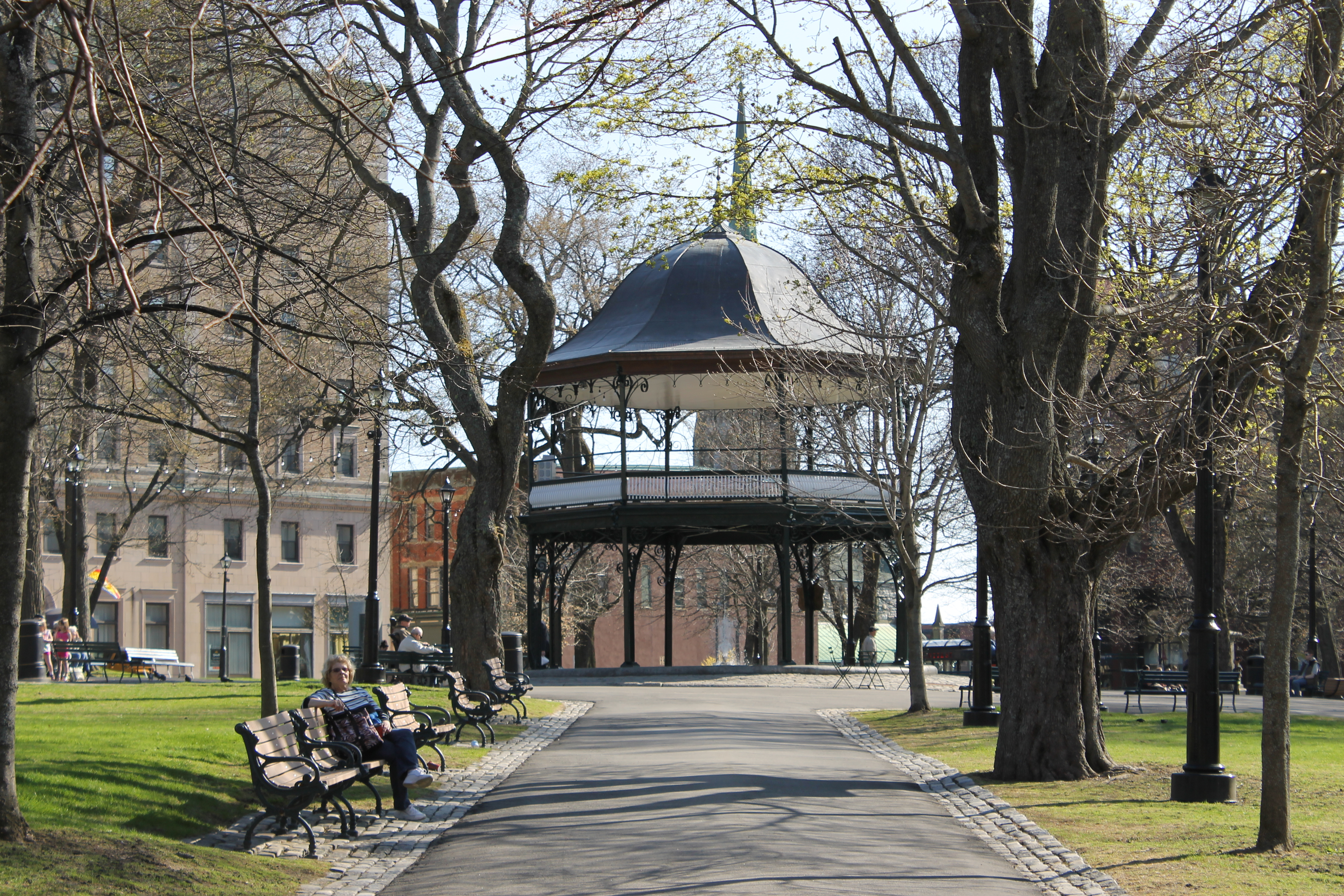
- Skyline of Uptown Saint John Imperial Theatre New Brunswick Museum Reversing Falls Bridge Saint John City Market Germain Street row houses King's Square

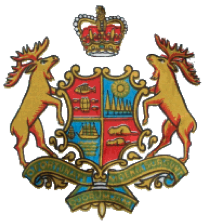
- Flag Coat of arms Logo
- Nicknames: "Port City"
- Motto: "O Fortunati Quorum Jam Moenia Surgunt" (Latin for, "O Fortunate Ones Whose Walls Are Now Rising." or "O Happy They, Whose Promised Walls Already Rise")
- Location of Saint John Saint John (Canada)
- Coordinates: 45°16′50″N 66°4′34″W
- Country: Canada
- Province: New Brunswick
- Historic countries: Kingdom of France; Kingdom of Great Britain; United Kingdom of Great Britain and Ireland
- County: Saint John
- Parish: City of Saint John
- Founded on: 24 June 1604
- Major Settlement Started: 1783
- Incorporation: 18 May 1785
- Named for: Saint John River

Government
  - Mayor: Donna Reardon
  - Governing body: Saint John Common Council
  - MPs: Wayne Long (Lib.); John Williamson (Con.)
  - MLAs: John Dornan (Lib.); Kate Elman Wilcott (Lib.); David Hickey (Lib.); Ian Lee (PC); Glen Savoie (PC)

Area
  - Land: 315.59 km^{2} (121.85 sq mi)
  - Urban: 70.05 km^{2} (27.05 sq mi)
  - Metro: 3,505.66 km^{2} (1,353.54 sq mi)
- Highest elevation: 80.8 m (265 ft)
- Lowest elevation: 0 m (0 ft)

Population (2021)
  - City: 69,895
  - Density: 221.5/km^{2} (574/sq mi)
  - Urban: 63,447
  - Urban density: 905.8/km^{2} (2,346/sq mi)
  - Metro: 130,613
  - Metro density: 37.3/km^{2} (97/sq mi)
  - City Pop 2016–2021: ▲3.4%
  - Dwellings: 33,908
- Demonym(s): Saint Johner, Saint-Jeannois(e), Johner (colloquial)
- Time zone: UTC– 04:00 (AST)
  - Summer (DST): UTC– 03:00 (ADT)
- Canadian Postal code: E2H, E2J, E2K, E2L, E2M, E2N, E2P, E2R, and E2S
- Area code: 506 and 428
- Highways: Route 1 Route 7 Route 100; Route 111; Route 820; Route 825
- NTS Map: 21G8 Saint John
- GNBC Code: DAEGW
- GDP (Saint John CMA): CA$6.4 billion (2016)
- GDP per capita (Saint John CMA): CA$51,021 (2016)
- Website: saintjohn.ca/en

Saint John (French: Saint-Jean) is a seaport city located on the Bay of Fundy in the province of New Brunswick, Canada. It is Canada's oldest incorporated city, (Note: While other cities throughout Canada were founded as communities earlier, Saint John was the first to be officially incorporated as a city.) established by royal charter on 18 May 1785, during the reign of George III. The Port of Saint John is Canada's third-largest by tonnage with a cargo base that includes dry and liquid bulk, break bulk, containers, and cruise. The city has a strong industrial base, including oil refining and manufacturing, as well as significant finance and tourism sectors and research institutions such as the New Brunswick Museum and the University of New Brunswick. Saint John was the most populous city in New Brunswick for more than 230 years until the 2016 census, when it was overtaken by Moncton. As of 2021, Saint John is the second-largest city in the province, with a population of 69,895 over an area of 315.59 square kilometres (121.85 sq mi).

French explorer Samuel de Champlain landed at Saint John Harbour on 24 June 1604, the feast of St. John the Baptist, and named the Saint John River in his honour; the indigenous Mi'kmaq and Wolastoqiyik peoples called the river "Wolastoq". The Saint John area was an important location for trade and defence in Acadia during the French colonial era, and Fort La Tour, in the city's harbour, was a pivotal battleground during the Acadian Civil War.

After more than a century of ownership disputes between the French and English over the land surrounding Saint John, the British government deported the Acadians in 1755 following the destruction of Fort Menagoueche, which was reconstructed as Fort Frederick. Following the pillaging and burning of Fort Frederick by American privateers, Fort Howe was constructed across the river above the harbour in 1779. In 1785, the City of Saint John was established by uniting the two communities of Parr-town and Carleton on opposite sides of the harbour after the arrival of thousands of refugees from the newly founded United States who wished to remain British after the American Revolution. During the next century, immigration via Partridge Island, especially during the Great Famine, would fundamentally change the city's demographics and culture.

== History ==
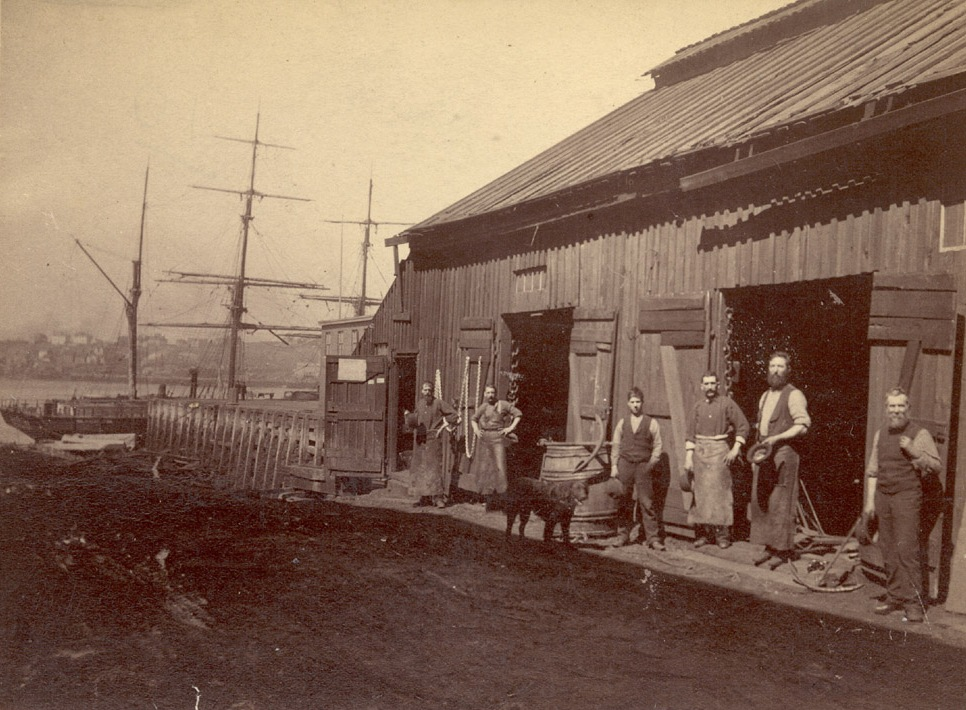
A blacksmith shop near Saint John Harbour during the late 19th century.

The Saint John area had been inhabited by peoples of the Wabanaki Confederacy for thousands of years. The northwestern coastal region of the Bay of Fundy was home to the Passamaquoddy Nation, while the Saint John River valley north of the bay became the domain of the Wolastoqiyik Nation. The Mi'kmaq also frequented the Saint John area due to the harbour and coast being an important hunting ground for seals. The area around the harbour, where the city is, has been traditionally called Menahkwesk by the Wolastoqiyik people, who continue to reside in and around the city. In precolonial times, the Wolastoqiyik lived in mostly self-sustaining villages living largely off bass, sturgeon, salmon, corn, wild roots and berries.

In 1604, Samuel de Champlain landed at Saint John Harbour, though he did not settle the area. Saint John played a crucial role in trade and defense for Acadia during the French colonial era, with Fort La Tour in the city's harbour becoming a pivotal battleground during the Acadian Civil War. At the end of the Seven Years' War, the British took the region from the French.

The population of Saint John grew with immigration from the former Thirteen Colonies and Europe. In particular, a large number of United Empire Loyalists began arriving in May 1783 in the aftermath of the American Revolutionary War. Within months, over 10,000 Loyalists had arrived at the harbour. Immigration led to the building of North America's first quarantine station, Partridge Island.

Saint John was officially established by royal charter on 18 May 1785, making it the first incorporated city in what is now Canada. The first Saint John Common Council meeting took place two days later. Gabriel George Ludlow was appointed as the first mayor. The city was named "Saint John" by the suggestion of Ward Chipman, who also wrote the city charter.

The Marco Polo

The city became a shipyard of global stature, producing vessels such as the 1851 ship Marco Polo, which became the fastest in the world, and witnessing the development of the automated foghorn by Robert Foulis.

Bird's-eye view of Saint John in 1882

As the city grew in strategic importance to English power and capital, unrest grew among many of its working class. Black Saint Johners faced restrictions on trade, fishing and voting, compelling the majority of the city's Black community to settle in Portland (the city's north end), which later became amalgamated with Saint John. In 1849, Canada's first labour union, the Laborer's Benevolent Association (now ILA local 273) was formed by longshoremen. Between 1840 and 1860, sectarian violence became rampant in Saint John as tensions escalated in response to the poor living conditions of poor Irish Catholics, resulting in some of the worst urban riots in Canadian history. Saint John experienced a cholera outbreak in 1854 that claimed over 1,500 lives, as well as the Great Fire of Saint John in 1877 that destroyed 40% of the city and left 13,000 people homeless. Although the fire caused damages exceeding $10 million (equivalent to approximately $256 million today), Saint John quickly embarked on rebuilding. Nevertheless, the aftermath prompted many residents to leave the city.

== Geography and climate ==
=== Physical geography ===
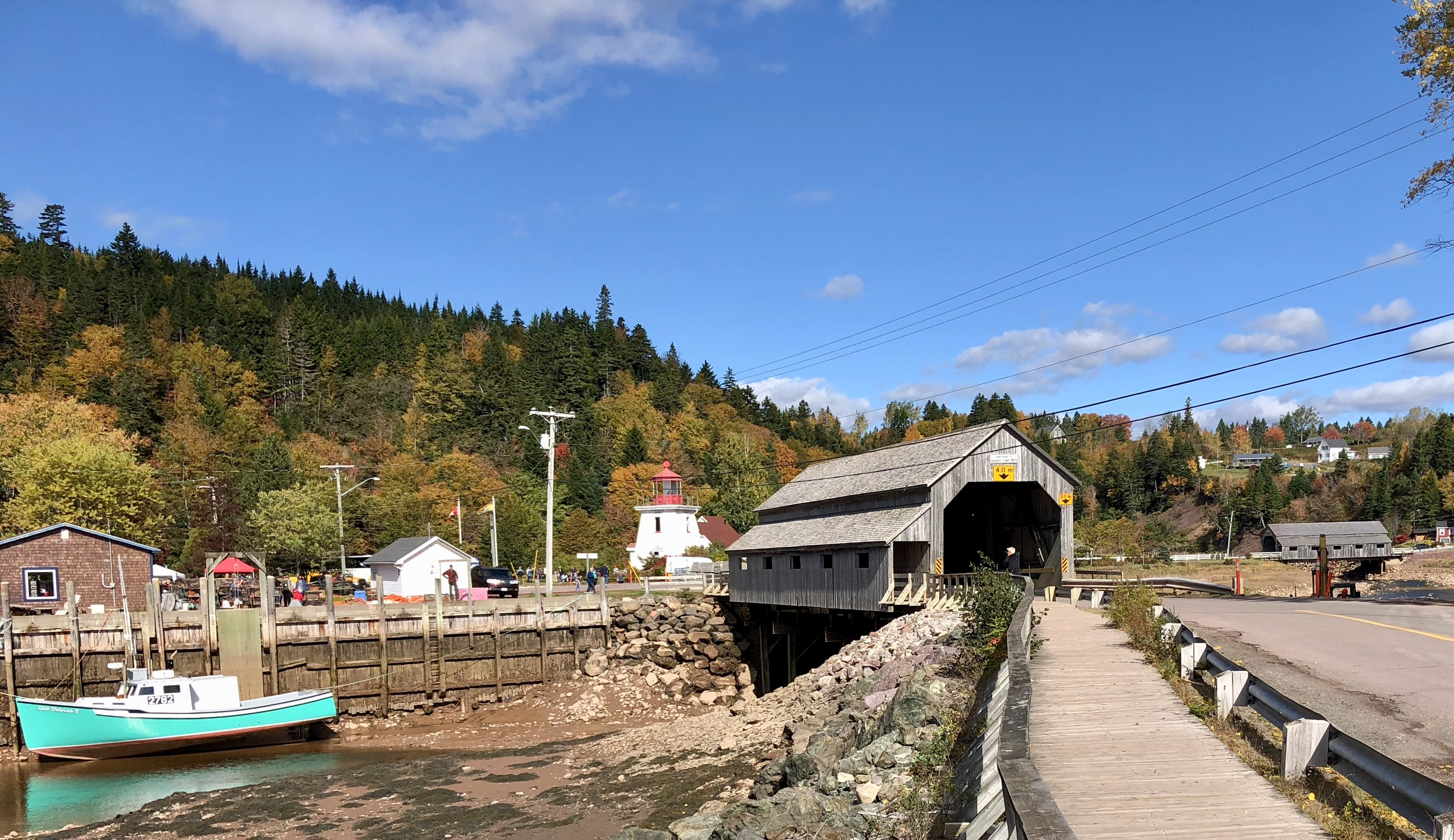
Covered bridges dot the Greater Saint John region.

Situated in the south-central portion of the province, along the north shore of the Bay of Fundy at the mouth of the Saint John River, the city is split by the south-flowing river and the east side is bordered on the north by the Kennebecasis River where it meets the Saint John River at Grand Bay. The city hosts many beaches and is just east of New River Beach Provincial Park. Saint John Harbour, where the two rivers meet the Bay of Fundy, is a deep water port and ice-free all year long. Partridge Island is in the harbour. The city land area is 315.96 km^{2} (121.99 sq mi), and the metropolitan area covers 3,509.62 km^{2} (1,355.07 sq mi).

Stonehammer UNESCO Geopark, the first Geopark in North America, is centred around Saint John. The Geopark has been recognized by UNESCO as having exceptional geological significance. The park contains rock formations that date back to the Precambrian era and some of the rocks may be a billion years old.

The Saint John River itself flows into the Bay of Fundy through a narrow gorge several hundred metres wide at the centre of the city. It contains a unique phenomenon called the Reversing Falls where the diurnal tides of the bay reverse the water flow of the river for several kilometres. A series of underwater ledges at the narrowest point of this gorge also create a series of rapids.

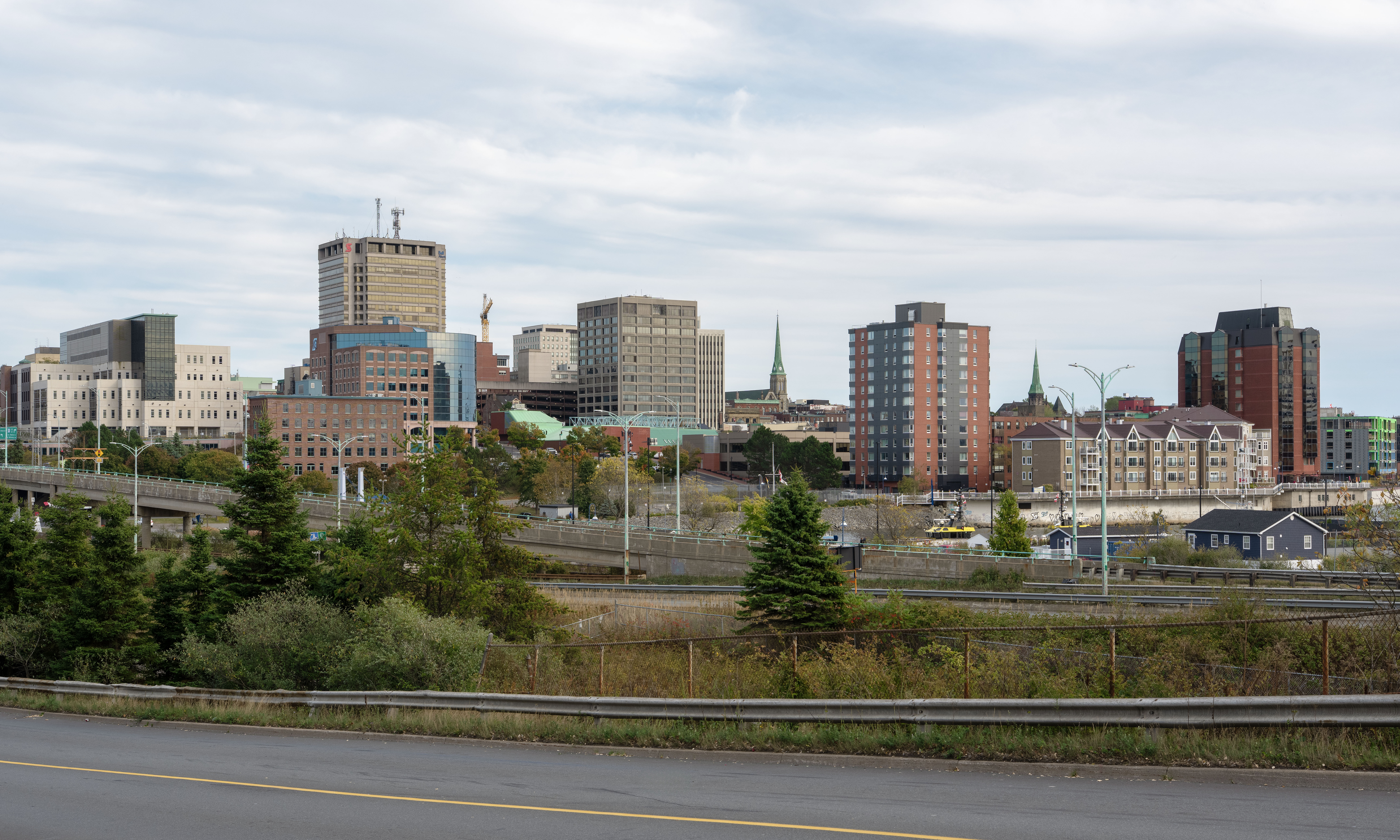
Uptown Saint John skyline in 2025.

The topography surrounding Saint John is hilly; a result of the influence of two coastal mountain ranges which run along the Bay of Fundy – the St. Croix Highlands and the Caledonia Highlands. The soil throughout the region is extremely rocky with frequent granite outcrops. The coastal plain hosts numerous freshwater lakes in the eastern, western and northern parts of the city.

In Saint John, the height difference from low to high tide is approximately 8 metres (28 ft) due to the funnelling effect of the Bay of Fundy as it narrows. The Reversing Falls in Saint John, actually an area of strong rapids, provides one example of the power of these tides; at every high tide, ocean water is pushed through a narrow gorge in the middle of the city and forces the Saint John River to reverse its flow for several hours.

=== Architecture ===
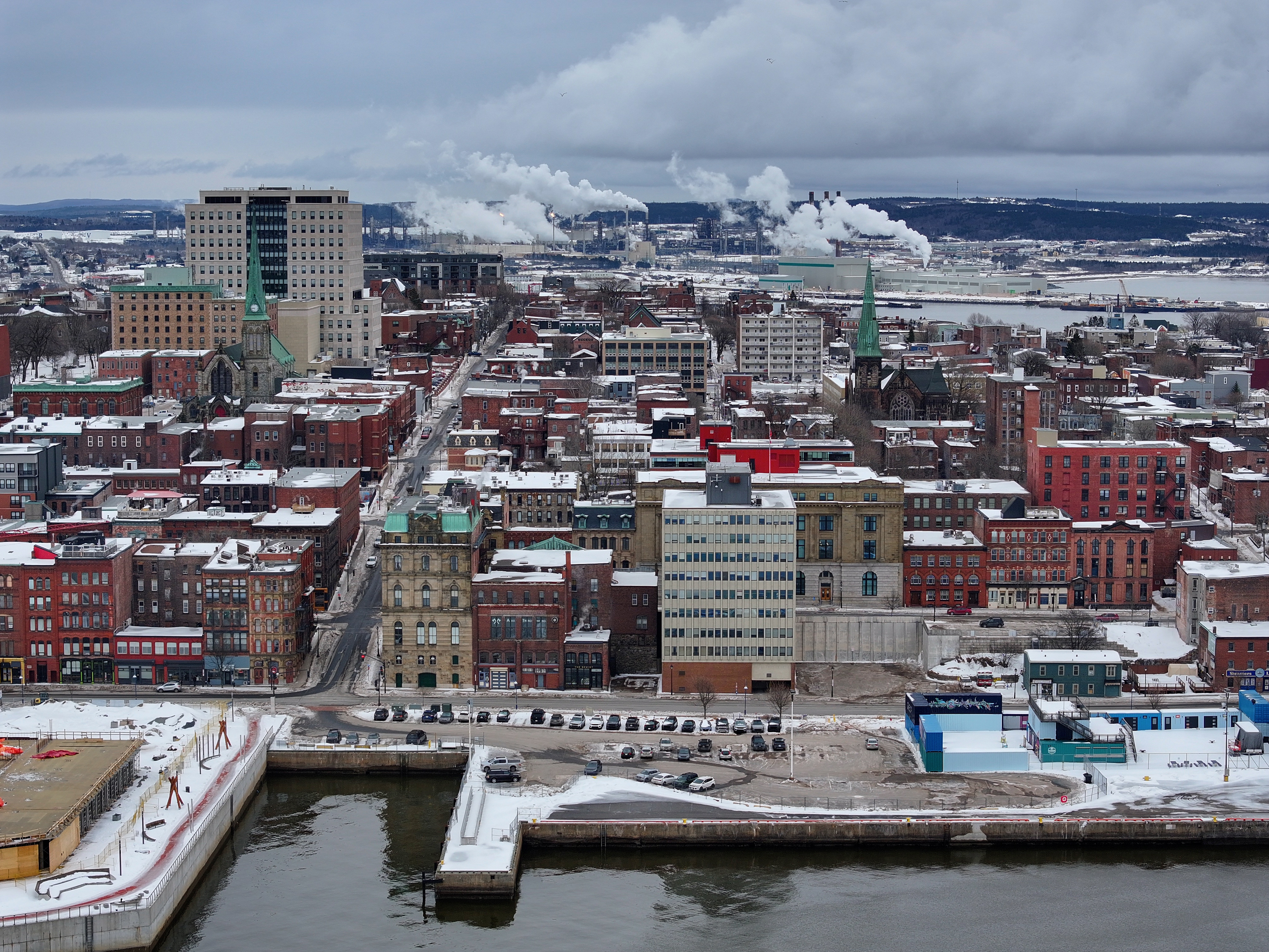
The South-Central Peninsula was rebuilt after the Great Saint John Fire using red-brick cladding.

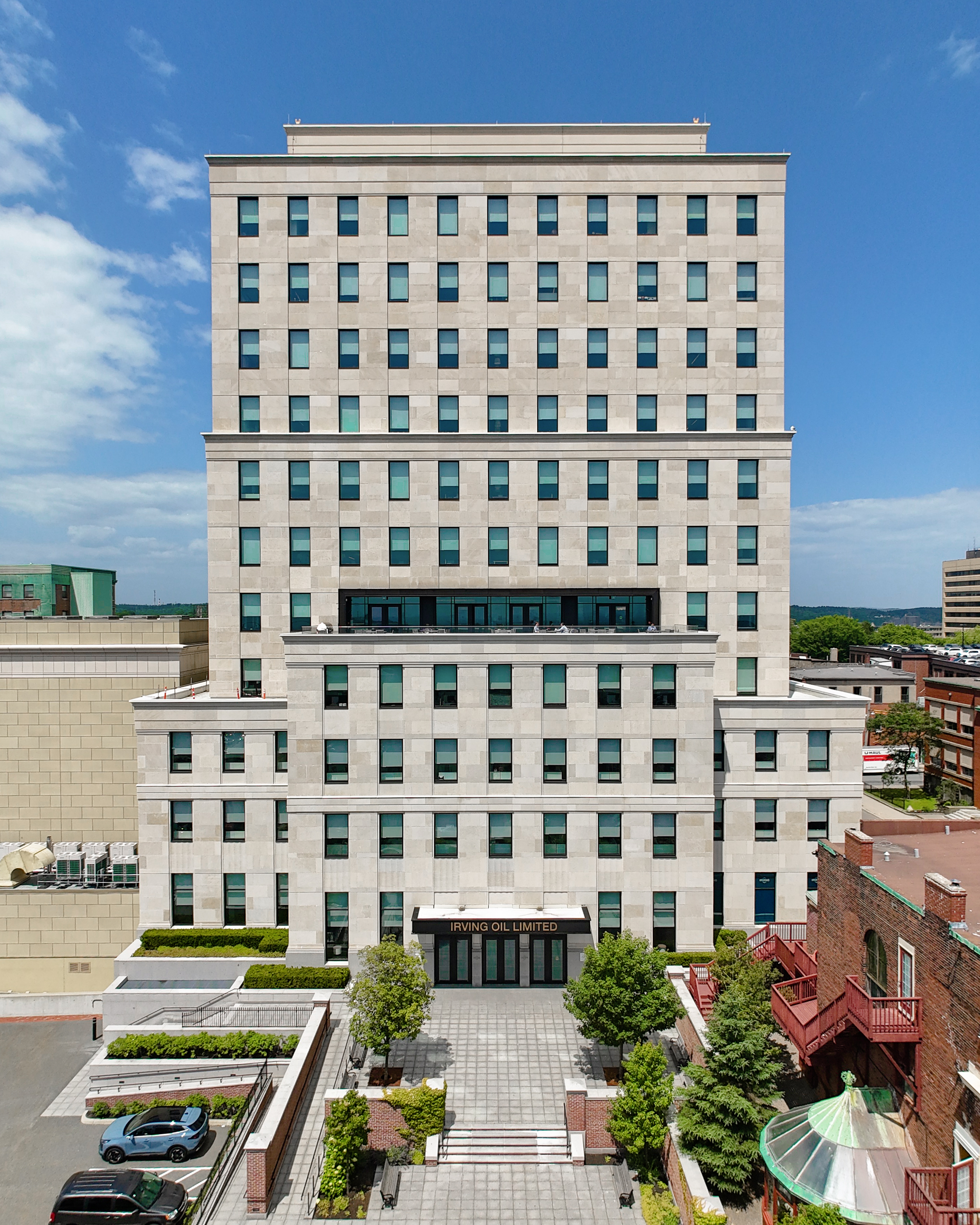
Irving Oil Home Office

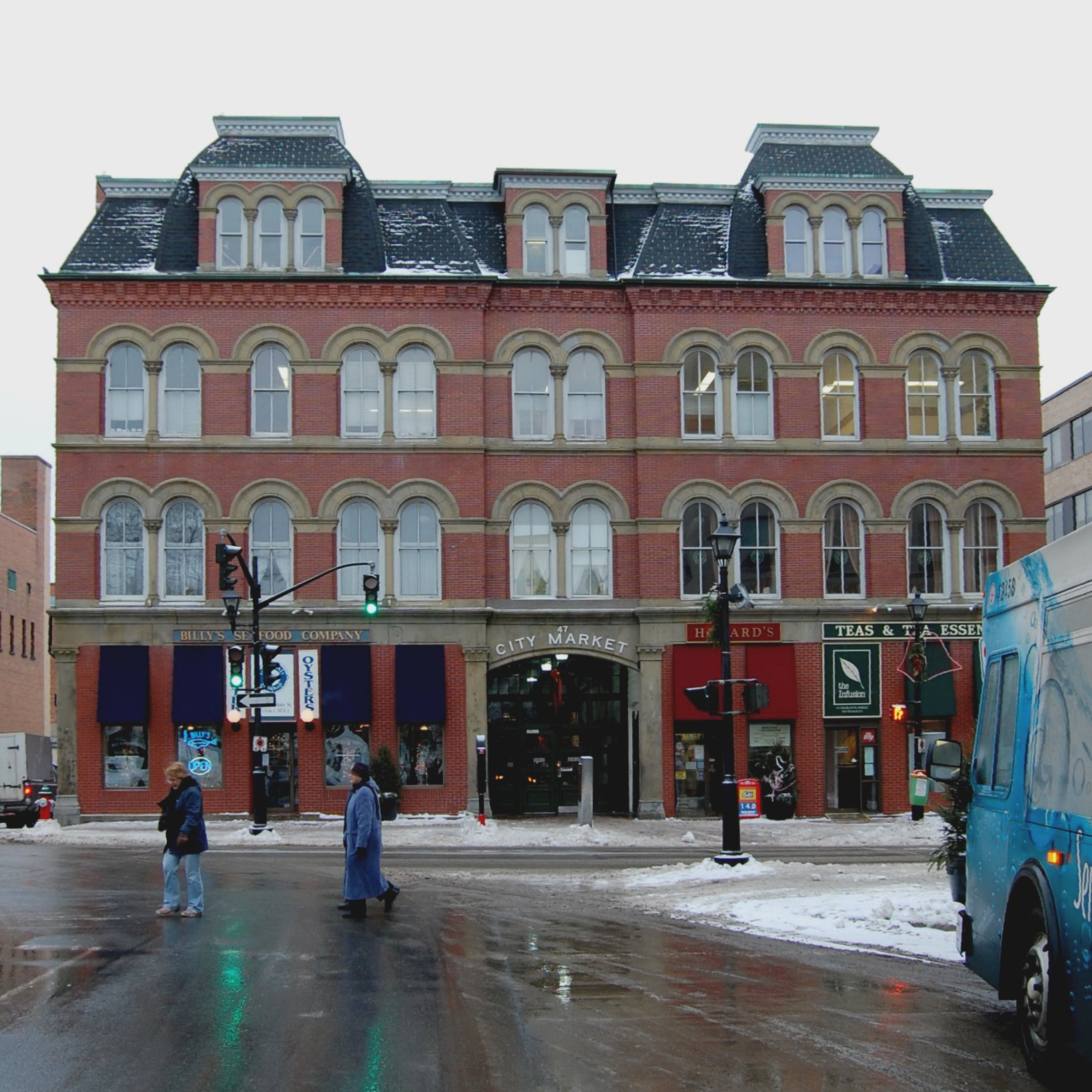
Saint John City Market

Saint John, especially in its Uptown region, features a multitude of architectural styles spanning from the 19th and early 20th centuries, with residences and buildings containing Victorian, Romanesque Revival, and Second Empire architectural styles. Over time, the city saw the use of Georgian, Greek Revival, Gothic Revival, Italianate, Second Empire and Queen Anne style architecture.

As Saint John rebuilt from the Great Fire in 1877, buildings started to be constructed using brick and stone rather than wood. During the late 19th to early 20th centuries, the most popular styles in the city were Queen Anne and Romanesque architecture. In 1911, a proposed city hall was to share Gothic and Second Empire architectural styles. Over time, the city ceased adopting some of these styles. Buildings in Saint John also feature stone carvings and sculptures.

In 1982, Saint John introduced the Trinity Royal Heritage Conservation Area, which works to preserve historic districts and buildings in the city. The Saint John Preservation Areas By-Law regulates exterior work done to these properties in a way that preserves the historic architecture in buildings built prior to 1915.

List of notable buildings in Saint John:

- Brunswick Square (80.8 m (265 ft)) 19-storey office tower with 511,032 ft^{2} (47,476.4 m^{2}) which was built in 1976. It is the largest office building in New Brunswick in terms of square footage and second in Atlantic Canada behind the Maritime Centre in Halifax.
- Cathedral of the Immaculate Conception (Gothic style Catholic cathedral, construction began in 1853, its spire rises to 70.1 m (230 ft))
- Trinity Anglican Church (60.9 m (200 ft)) Gothic Revival stone parish church rebuilt after the 1877 fire.
- Saint John City Hall (55.2 m (181 ft)) 16-storey office building (165,000 ft^{2} (15,300 m^{2}))
- Golden Ball Building (23.9 m (78 ft)) 5-storey office building built in 1931, formerly used as the home office of Irving Oil.
- Brunswick House (52 m (171 ft)) 14-storey office building (103,000 ft^{2} (9,600 m^{2}))
- Irving Building (50 m (160 ft)) 14-storey office building
- Harbourside Senior Citizens Housing Complex (43 m (141 ft)) 12-storey apartment building
- Harbour Building (37 m (121 ft)) 10-storey office building
- Mercantile Centre (30 m (98 ft)) 7-storey office building (106,600 ft^{2} (9,900 m^{2}))
- Chateau Saint John 8-storey hotel (112 rooms)
- City Market (built in 1876, oldest city market in North America, with an original ship's hull roof design)
- Loyalist House (built in 1817)
- Irving Oil Home Office (2019) 11-storey office building

=== Parks and nature ===
Saint John is home to the historic King's Square, an urban park located in the city's Uptown region. Multiple historic buildings are located by the park, including the Saint John City Market, the Imperial Theatre, as well as the former Admiral Beatty Hotel. King's Square's counterpart, Queen Square, is another urban park located a few blocks south from it. Queen Square features an annual outdoor farmers market which runs through the summer months.

Located in the city's west side is the Irving Nature Park, measuring 600 acres (240 hectares). Saint John is also home to Rockwood Park, a large municipal park located to the east of the Millidgeville neighbourhood. Designed in the 19th century by landscape designer Calvert Vaux, one of the designers of New York City's Central Park, it features 2,200 acres of park area, ten lakes, and 55 trails and footpaths.

=== Neighbourhoods ===
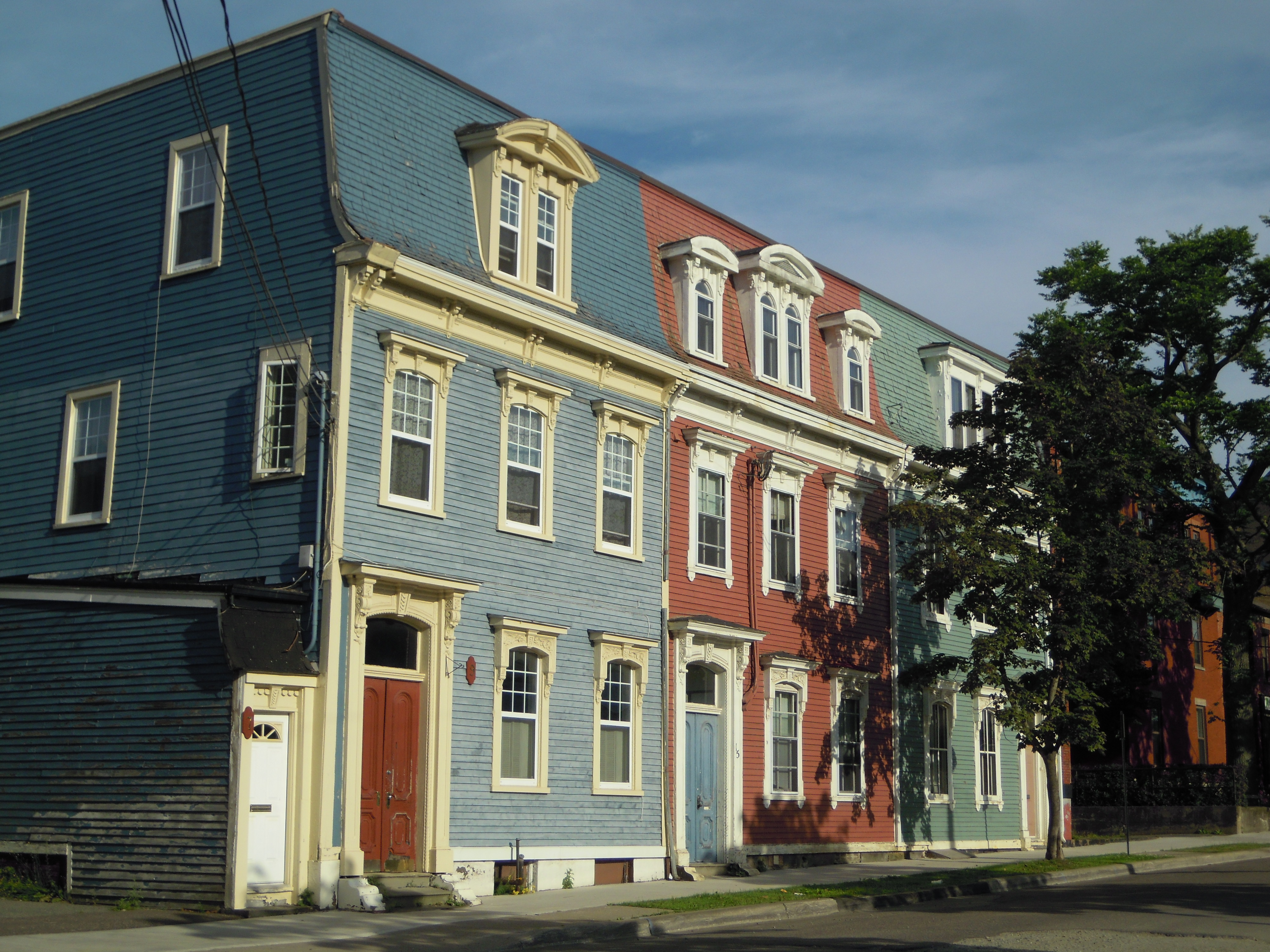
Row houses in Saint John

According to Saint John mapping data, the city has 33 neighborhoods categorized into four groups: North, East, South and West.

- North: North End (mostly the former city of Portland), Pokiok, Douglas Avenue, Churchill Boulevard, Cedar Point, Millidgeville, Mount Pleasant, Kennebecasis Bay, and Brookville. Cedar Point is the site of the city's only completely French school and community centre, Centre Scolaire Communautaire Samuel-de-Champlain. The area includes one of Canada's largest urban parks, Rockwood Park.
- East: East Saint John, McAllister, Champlain Heights, Eastwood, Red Head, Forest Hills, Lakewood, Glen Falls, Latimer Lake, and Loch Lomond.
- South: Typically referred to as the South Central Peninsula. Includes Uptown, Germain Street, Broad Street (although the mapping data refers to the area as Broad Street, it is commonly known as South End, which formerly encompassed Lower Cove), Orange Street, and Waterloo Village. On the east side of Saint John Harbour and the area immediately opposite on the west side are the sites of the original city. Now includes the central business district and the Trinity Royal Heritage Conservation Area, which together are referred to as Uptown.
- West: Saint John West (includes Carleton), Lower West Side, Sand Cove, Fairville, Island View, Lorneville, Ocean Westway, Milford-Randolph, and South Bay. Collectively referred to as West Side, but Lancaster was a notable former municipality.

=== Climate ===
Saint John

Climate chart (precipitation, max. and min. temperature)
J	F	M	A	M	J	J	A	S	O	N	D
139 −3 −14	94 −2 −13	118 2 −7	104 8 −1	118 15 4	101 20 8	102 22 12	90 22 12	117 18 8	125 12 3	134 6 −2	149 0 −10
- █ Average max. and min. temperatures in °C
- █ Precipitation totals in mm
- Source: Environment Canada
Imperial conversion
J	F	M	A	M	J	J	A	S	O	N	D
5.5 27 8	3.7 29 9	4.6 36 19	4.1 47 30	4.6 59 39	4 67 47	4 72 53	3.5 72 53	4.6 64 46	4.9 53 37	5.3 43 28	5.9 33 15
- █ Average max. and min. temperatures in °F
- █ Precipitation totals in inches

The climate of Saint John is humid continental (Köppen climate classification Dfb). The Bay of Fundy never fully freezes, thus moderating the winter temperatures compared with inland locations. Even so, with the prevailing wind blowing from the west (from land to sea), the average January temperature is about −8.2 °C (17.2 °F). Summers are usually warm to hot, and daytime temperatures often exceed 25 °C (77 °F). The highest temperature recorded in a given year is usually 31 or 32 °C (88 or 90 °F). The confluence of cold Bay of Fundy air and inland warmer temperatures often creates onshore winds that bring periods of fog and cooler temperatures during the summer months.

Precipitation in Saint John totals about 1,295 mm (51.0 in) annually and is well distributed throughout the year, although the late autumn and early winter are typically the wettest time of year. Snowfalls can often be heavy, but rain is as common as snow in winter, and it is not unusual for the ground to be snow-free even in mid-winter.

The highest temperature ever recorded in Saint John was 34.5 °C (94 °F) on 20 June 2024. The coldest temperature ever recorded was −36.7 °C (−34 °F) on 11 February 1948.

Climate data for Saint John (Saint John Airport), elevation: 103 m (338 ft), 1991–2020 normals, extremes 1871–present (Note: Based on station coordinates provided by Environment Canada, climate data recorded near downtown Saint John from January 1871 to September 1970, and at Saint John Airport from November 1946 to present.)
Month	Jan	Feb	Mar	Apr	May	Jun	Jul	Aug	Sep	Oct	Nov	Dec	Year
Record high humidex	18.3	13.8	27.0	23.8	35.4	42.0	40.3	40.3	39.4	28.3	24.0	19.8	42.0
Record high °C (°F)	14.5 (58.1)	13.3 (55.9)	25.4 (77.7)	22.8 (73.0)	33.0 (91.4)	34.5 (94.1)	33.7 (92.7)	34.4 (93.9)	33.9 (93.0)	28.9 (84.0)	21.7 (71.1)	16.4 (61.5)	34.5 (94.1)
Mean maximum °C (°F)	8.9 (48.0)	7.6 (45.7)	11.3 (52.3)	17.3 (63.1)	24.3 (75.7)	28.1 (82.6)	29.1 (84.4)	28.9 (84.0)	25.5 (77.9)	20.3 (68.5)	15.7 (60.3)	11.9 (53.4)	30.7 (87.3)
Mean daily maximum °C (°F)	−2.5 (27.5)	−1.6 (29.1)	2.6 (36.7)	8.8 (47.8)	15.3 (59.5)	20.0 (68.0)	23.0 (73.4)	23.0 (73.4)	18.8 (65.8)	13.0 (55.4)	6.9 (44.4)	1.3 (34.3)	10.7 (51.3)
Daily mean °C (°F)	−7.9 (17.8)	−7.1 (19.2)	−2.6 (27.3)	3.7 (38.7)	9.4 (48.9)	14.1 (57.4)	17.3 (63.1)	17.1 (62.8)	13.1 (55.6)	7.9 (46.2)	2.4 (36.3)	−3.5 (25.7)	5.3 (41.5)
Mean daily minimum °C (°F)	−13.2 (8.2)	−12.6 (9.3)	−7.7 (18.1)	−1.6 (29.1)	3.5 (38.3)	8.1 (46.6)	11.6 (52.9)	11.2 (52.2)	7.4 (45.3)	2.6 (36.7)	−2 (28)	−8.3 (17.1)	0.1 (32.2)
Mean minimum °C (°F)	−24.9 (−12.8)	−24.0 (−11.2)	−19.5 (−3.1)	−8.5 (16.7)	−2.5 (27.5)	1.6 (34.9)	6.3 (43.3)	4.6 (40.3)	−0.7 (30.7)	−5.1 (22.8)	−11.4 (11.5)	−19.4 (−2.9)	−26.2 (−15.2)
Record low °C (°F)	−33.2 (−27.8)	−36.7 (−34.1)	−30.0 (−22.0)	−16.7 (1.9)	−7.8 (18.0)	−2.2 (28.0)	1.1 (34.0)	−0.6 (30.9)	−6.7 (19.9)	−10.6 (12.9)	−16.9 (1.6)	−34.4 (−29.9)	−36.7 (−34.1)
Record low wind chill	−44.8	−44.4	−39.5	−26.1	−13.9	−4.3	0.0	0.0	−5.7	−12.9	−26.7	−41.9	−44.8
Average precipitation mm (inches)	116.1 (4.57)	91.9 (3.62)	107.3 (4.22)	100.2 (3.94)	93.9 (3.70)	86.8 (3.42)	89.5 (3.52)	73.0 (2.87)	108.8 (4.28)	138.0 (5.43)	138.2 (5.44)	127.6 (5.02)	1,271.3 (50.05)
Average rainfall mm (inches)	65.6 (2.58)	52.7 (2.07)	74.2 (2.92)	82.0 (3.23)	93.1 (3.67)	85.1 (3.35)	86.4 (3.40)	71.3 (2.81)	112.2 (4.42)	137.1 (5.40)	126.4 (4.98)	87.5 (3.44)	1,073.5 (42.26)
Average snowfall cm (inches)	59.8 (23.5)	45.5 (17.9)	36.8 (14.5)	16.3 (6.4)	0.8 (0.3)	0.0 (0.0)	0.0 (0.0)	0.0 (0.0)	0.0 (0.0)	0.9 (0.4)	12.5 (4.9)	42.2 (16.6)	214.8 (84.6)
Average precipitation days (≥ 0.2 mm)	16.0	12.9	13.8	13.8	13.5	12.4	11.3	9.9	10.7	12.4	14.0	14.9	155.5
Average rainy days (≥ 0.2 mm)	6.7	5.6	8.0	11.1	13.4	12.4	11.3	9.8	10.8	12.3	12.1	9.0	122.4
Average snowy days (≥ 0.2 cm)	12.7	10.8	9.0	4.7	0.21	0.0	0.0	0.0	0.0	0.39	3.7	9.2	50.7
Average dew point °C (°F)	−11.3 (11.7)	−10.9 (12.4)	−7.0 (19.4)	−1.6 (29.1)	4.4 (39.9)	9.6 (49.3)	13.3 (55.9)	13.2 (55.8)	10.0 (50.0)	4.4 (39.9)	−0.9 (30.4)	−6.5 (20.3)	1.5 (34.7)
Mean monthly sunshine hours	124.9	124.5	149.9	165.9	199.0	211.6	225.9	216.8	181.9	147.8	97.0	102.0	1,947.3
Percentage possible sunshine	44.0	42.6	40.7	41.0	43.2	45.3	47.7	49.6	48.3	43.4	33.8	37.4	43.1
Source 1: Environment Canada
Source 2: weatherstats.ca (for dewpoint and monthly&yearly average absolute maximum&minimum temperature)

== Demographics ==
Historical populations
Year	Pop.	±%
1824	8,488	—
1834	12,073	+42.2%
1840	19,281	+59.7%
1851	22,745	+18.0%
1861	27,317	+20.1%
1871	28,805	+5.4%
1881	26,127	−9.3%
1891	39,179 (Note: Saint John was amalgamated with the neighbouring city of Portland in 1889.)	+50.0%
1901	40,711	+3.9%
1911	42,511	+4.4%
1921	47,166	+11.0%
1931	47,514	+0.7%
1941	50,084	+5.4%
1951	50,779	+1.4%
1956	52,491	+3.4%
1961	55,153	+5.1%
1966	51,567	−6.5%
1971	89,039 (Note: Saint John was amalgamated with the neighbouring city of Lancaster and part of Simonds Parish in 1967.)	+72.7%
1976	85,955	−3.5%
1981	80,521	−6.3%
1986	76,381	−5.1%
1991	74,969	−1.8%
1996	72,494	−3.3%
2001	69,661	−3.9%
2006	68,043	−2.3%
2011	70,063	+3.0%
2016	67,575	−3.6%
2021	69,895	+3.4%

At the 2021 census conducted by Statistics Canada, Saint John had a population of 69,895 people that were living in 31,825 of 33,908 total private dwellings. The population density was 221.5 inhabitants per square kilometre (574 inhabitants per square mile), and is most densely populated in Uptown Saint John. The median total household income was $62,800. Of the city's population aged between 25 and 64, 24% held a bachelor's degree or higher, 58% held a postsecondary certificate, diploma or degree, and 32% had a high school diploma or equivalent. The median age was 44 years.

At the census metropolitan area (CMA) level in the 2021 census, the Saint John CMA had a population of 130,613 living in 55,865 of its 59,272 total private dwellings, a change of 3.5% from its 2016 population of 126,202. With a land area of 3,505.66 km^{2} (1,353.54 sq mi), it had a population density of 37.3/km^{2} (96.5/sq mi) in 2021.

=== Ethnicity ===
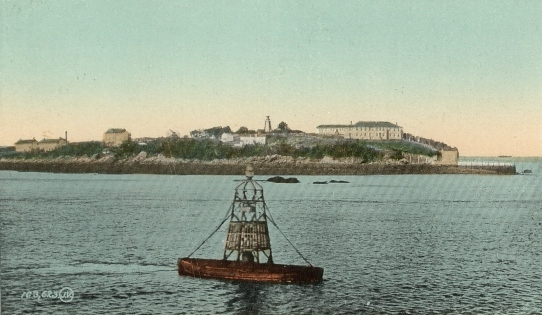
Partridge Island immigration station

Historically, as one of Canada's main ports, Saint John has been a centre for immigration from all over the world. The city was incorporated in the late 1700s after more than 3,300 Black Loyalist refugees came to Saint John along with more than 10,000 White refugees after the American Revolution. In the years between 1815 and 1867, when immigration of that era passed its peak, more than 150,000 immigrants from Ireland came to Saint John, dramatically changing the city.

Those who came in the earlier period were largely tradesmen, and many stayed in Saint John, becoming the backbone of its builders. But when the Great Famine of Ireland raged between 1845 and 1849, huge waves of famine refugees flooded the city's shores. It is estimated that between 1845 and 1847 some 30,000 arrived, more people than were living in the city at the time. In 1847, dubbed "Black 47", one of the worst years of the famine, some 16,000 immigrants, most of them from Ireland, arrived at Partridge Island, the immigration and quarantine station at the mouth of Saint John Harbour.

As of the 2021 census, approximately 86.4% of the residents were white, while 10.9% were visible minorities and 2.8% were Indigenous. The largest visible minority groups were Black (2.7%), South Asian (2.4%), Arab (1.5%), Chinese (1.4%), and Filipino (0.9%).

Panethnic groups in the City of Saint John (2001–2021)
Panethnic group	2021		2016		2011		2006		2001	
Panethnic group	Pop.	%	Pop.	%	Pop.	%	Pop.	%	Pop.	%
European (Note: Statistic includes all persons that did not make up part of a visible minority or an indigenous identity.)	58,875	86.35%	59,480	90.85%	62,940	92.68%	62,780	94.14%	65,375	95.49%
Indigenous	1,895	2.78%	1,430	2.18%	1,560	2.3%	850	1.27%	640	0.93%
African	1,820	2.67%	1,400	2.14%	1,200	1.77%	960	1.44%	1,110	1.62%
South Asian	1,605	2.35%	455	0.69%	350	0.52%	375	0.56%	205	0.3%
Middle Eastern (Note: Statistic includes total responses of "West Asian" and "Arab" under visible minority section on census.)	1,310	1.92%	845	1.29%	520	0.77%	360	0.54%	185	0.27%
East Asian (Note: Statistic includes total responses of "Chinese", "Korean", and "Japanese" under visible minority section on census.)	1,125	1.65%	1,170	1.79%	880	1.3%	940	1.41%	460	0.67%
Southeast Asian (Note: Statistic includes total responses of "Filipino" and "Southeast Asian" under visible minority section on census.)	900	1.32%	360	0.55%	250	0.37%	215	0.32%	150	0.22%
Latin American	345	0.51%	185	0.28%	155	0.23%	155	0.23%	125	0.18%
Other/multiracial (Note: Statistic includes total responses of "Visible minority, n.i.e." and "Multiple visible minorities" under visible minority section on census.)	285	0.42%	140	0.21%	55	0.08%	50	0.07%	205	0.3%
Total responses	68,180	97.55%	65,470	96.88%	67,910	96.93%	66,690	98.01%	68,465	98.28%
Total population	69,895	100%	67,575	100%	70,063	100%	68,043	100%	69,661	100%
Note: Totals greater than 100% due to multiple origin responses

=== Language ===
87.2% of residents spoke English as a mother tongue. Other common first languages were French (3.7%), Arabic (1.5%) Chinese languages (1.0%) and Tagalog (0.5%).

=== Religion ===
58.5% of residents were Christian, down from 79.6% in 2011. 29.7% were Catholic, 20.6% were Protestant, 5.1% were Christian n.o.s, and 3.0% were other Christian denominations or related traditions. 36.0% of the population were non-religious or secular, up from 18.4% in 2011. Other religions accounted for 5.5% of the population, up from 2.0% in 2011. The largest non-Christian religions were Islam (3.1%) and Hinduism (1.0%).

== Economy ==
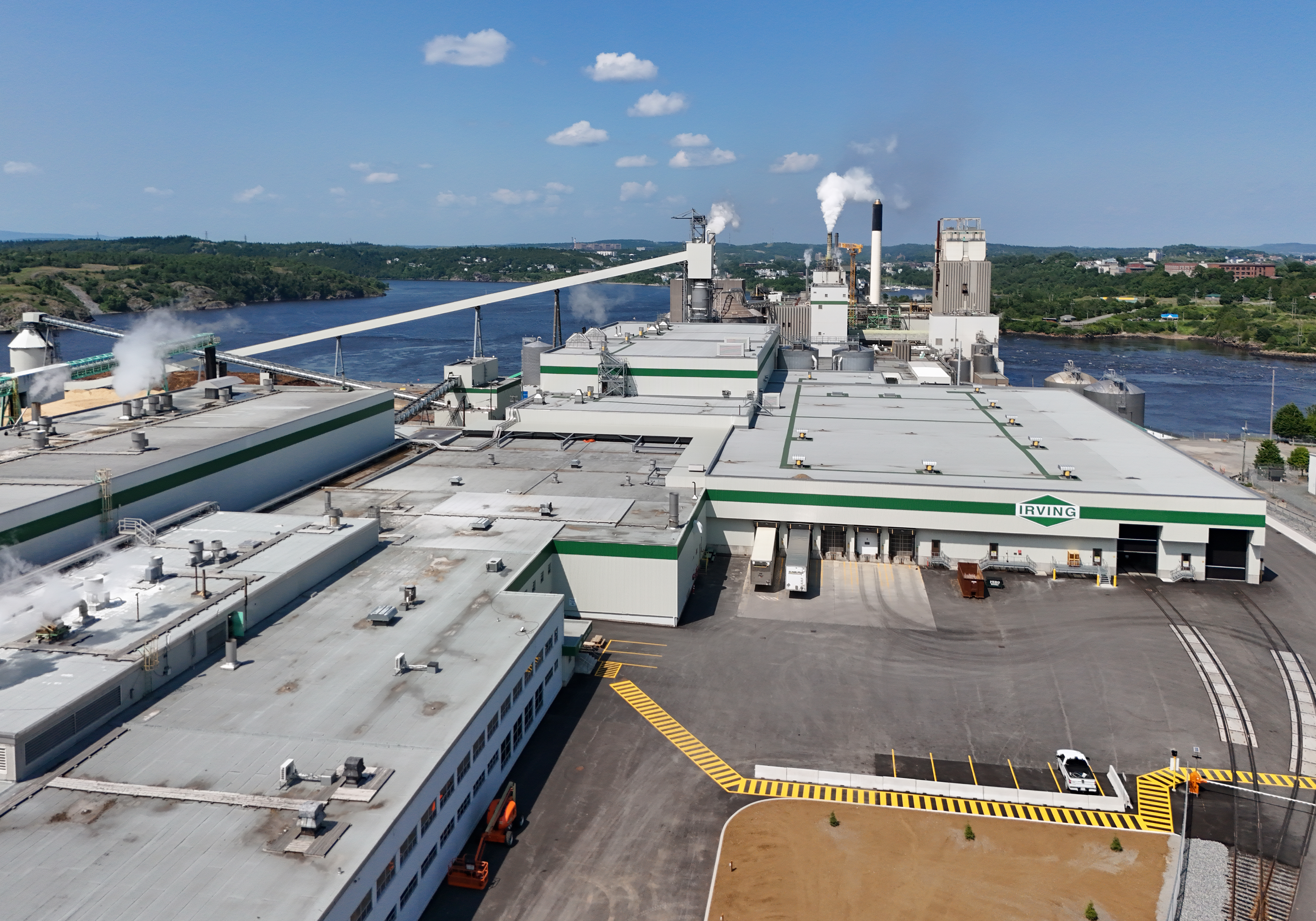
Irving Pulp and Paper mill

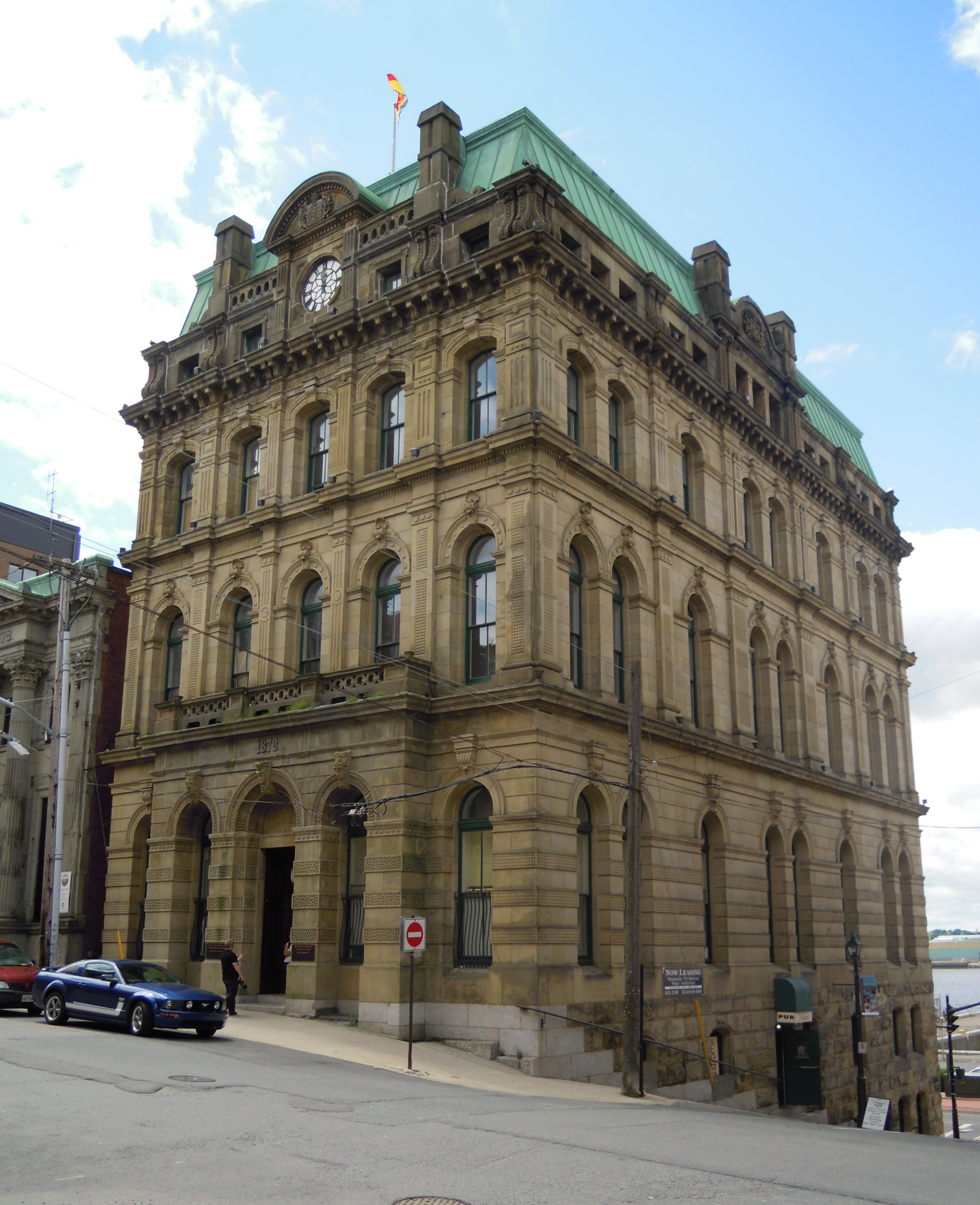
The Old Post Office

Saint John's location along the Bay of Fundy has been of major importance to the city's prosperity. The bay's dramatic tidal range prevents the harbour from icing over, allowing the city to be accessible all year round. Shipbuilding, shipping and lumber trade rose as prominent industries. By 1840, one-third of New Brunswick's timber, as well as two-thirds of its sawn lumber and manufactured wood products, were exported through Saint John. At one point, Saint John was British North America's biggest shipbuilding city, constructing many well-known ships, including the Marco Polo. However, these industries suffered a decline in trade due to technological advancements, which was only made worse with the Great Fire of Saint John in 1877. Shipbuilding in Saint John permanently ceased in 2003 following the closure of the Saint John shipyard, which had been idle for the past three years.

Today, Saint John benefits from industries such as tourism, reporting a tourism expenditure of $282 million in 2018. Port of Saint John, the city's port, allows for a capacity of three cruise ships, and has been a cruise ship destination since 1989, first welcoming the MS Cunard Princess. Saint John receives around 80 cruise ships annually. As of the 2023 cruise schedule, Saint John is scheduled to receive 190,680 passengers' worth of cruise ships. The port also carries over 20 million metric tonnes of cargo annually.

=== Arts and culture ===
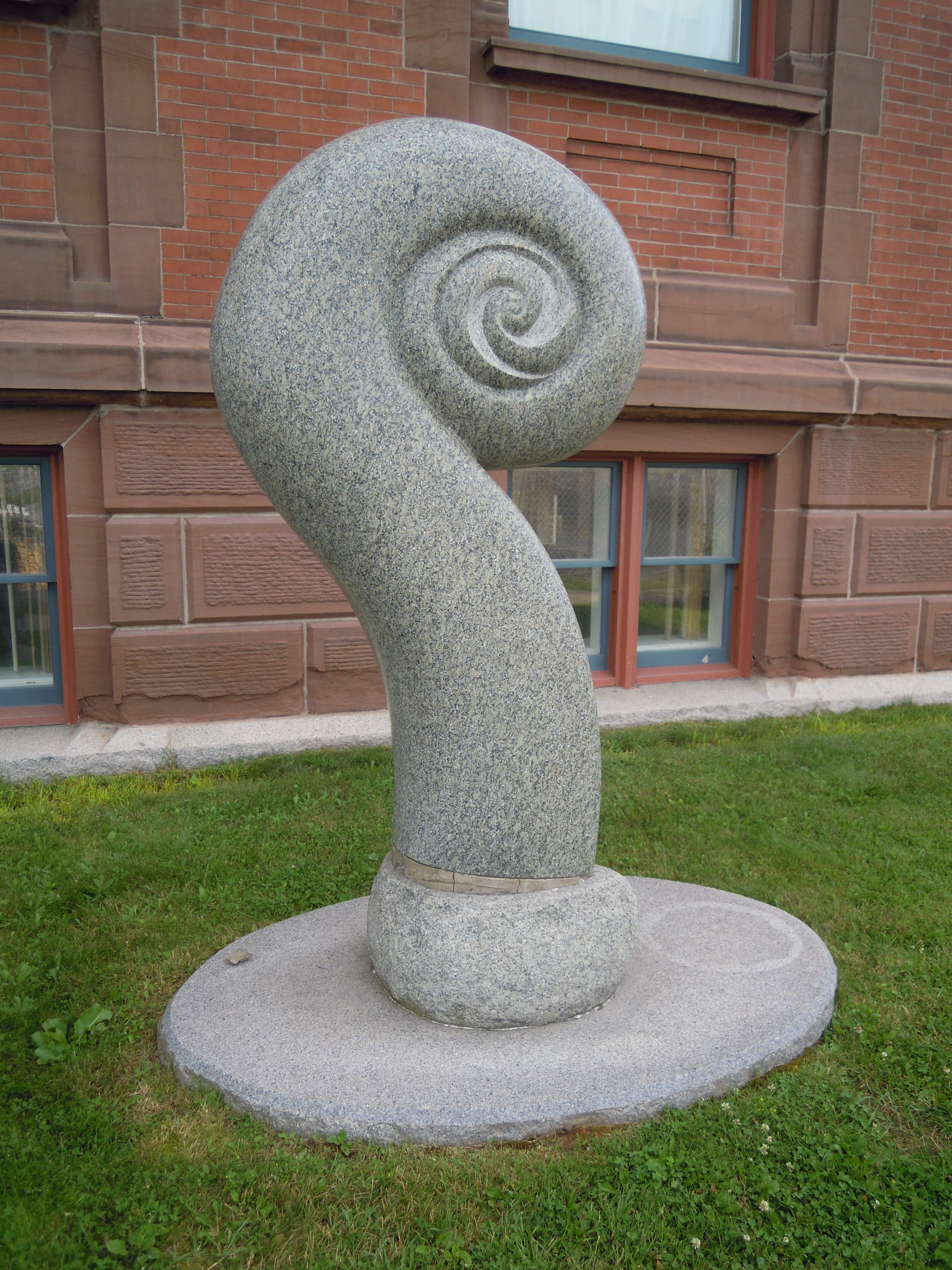
Fiddlehead sculpture at the Saint John Arts Centre in the city's uptown

The arts and culture sector plays a large role in Saint John's economy. The Imperial Theatre is home to the highly acclaimed Saint John Theatre Company, and the Symphony New Brunswick and hosts a large collection of plays, concerts and other stage productions year-round. TD Station entertainment complex is home to the Saint John Sea Dogs of the QMJHL.

Art galleries in Saint John cover the uptown, more than any other Atlantic Canadian city. Artists like Miller Brittain and Fred Ross have made Uptown Saint John their home, and now the torch has been passed to artists like Gerard Collins, Cliff Turner and Peter Salmon and their respective galleries. Uptown art galleries also include the Paris Crew, Trinity Galleries, Citadel Gallery, Handworks Gallery and the Saint John Arts Centre (SJAC). The SJAC in the Carnegie Building hosts art exhibits, workshops, local songwriters' circles and other shows too small to be featured at the grand Imperial Theatre.

=== Industry ===
Saint John maintains industrial infrastructure in the city's East side such as Canada's largest oil refinery as well as the country's largest dry dock. K.C. Irving and his family built his unfettered industrial conglomerate in the city by buying up mills, shipyards, media outlets, and other industrial infrastructure during the 20th century, and still continue to this day. Today Irving dominates the city and province with stakes in oil, forestry, shipbuilding, media and transportation. Irving companies remain dominant employers in the region with North America's first deepwater oil terminal, a pulp mill, a paper mill and a tissue paper plant.

Saint John has a long history of brewers, such as Simeon Jones, The Olands, and James Ready, Big Tide Brewing, Picaroon's, and Moosehead Brewery, established in 1867, and Canada's only nationally distributed independent brewery. The Horizon Health Network operates the five hospitals in the Saint John area.

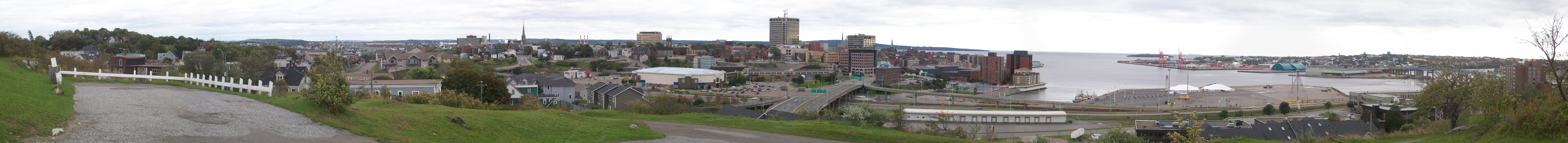
View from Fort Howe in 2008.

=== Maritime industries ===
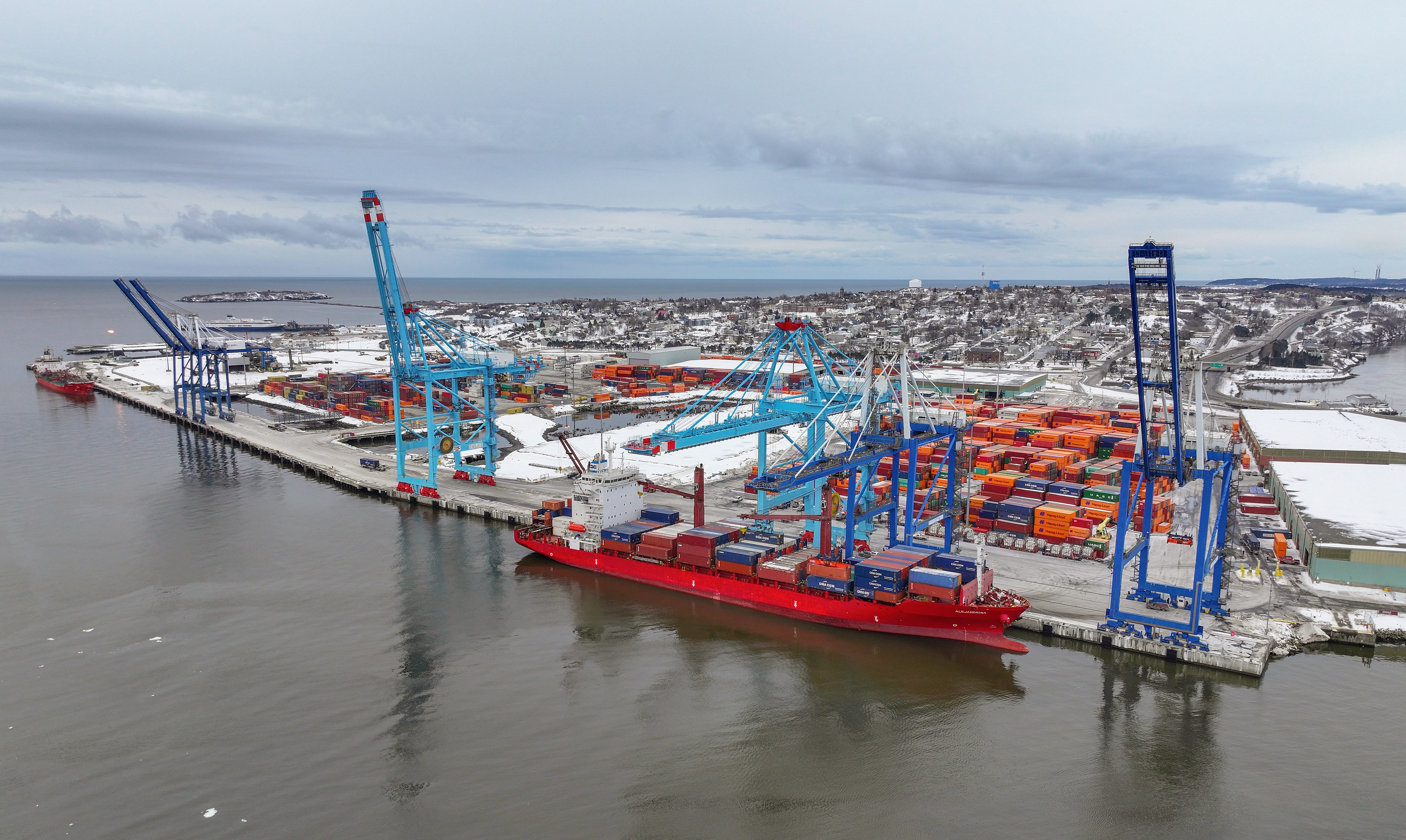
A container ship loading at the Port of Saint John

Saint John is a major Canadian port, and the only city on the Bay of Fundy. Until the first decade of the 21st century, Canada's largest shipyard (Irving Shipbuilding) had been an important employer in the city. During the 1980s-early 1990s the shipyard was responsible for building 9 of the 12 Halifax-class multi-purpose patrol frigates for the Canadian Navy. However, the Irving family closed the shipyard in 2003 and centralized in Halifax leaving the Saint John dry dock sitting idle.

Ecological research on surrounding marine life of the Bay of Fundy and the Saint John and Kennebecasis Rivers is centred in the city. The University of New Brunswick's Marine Biology department in Saint John as well as local NGO's and the federal Department of Fisheries and Oceans heads the majority of research and monitoring work on marine life and environments.

Traditional fisheries (lobster, scallops etc.) still make up the livelihood for many Saint Johners today. Aquaculture, primarily Atlantic Salmon farming, has grown to be a major employer in the region as the decline of other traditional wild fisheries has unfolded in recent decades. Cooke Aquaculture, one of the largest companies in the industry is headquartered in Saint John.

Prior to the opening of the St. Lawrence Seaway in 1959, the Port of Saint John functioned as the winter port for Montreal, Quebec when shipping was unable to traverse the sea ice in the Gulf of St. Lawrence and St. Lawrence River. The Canadian Pacific Railway opened a line to Saint John from Montreal in 1889 across the state of Maine and transferred the majority of its trans-Atlantic passenger and cargo shipping to the port during the winter months. The port fell into decline following the seaway opening and the start of year-round icebreaker services in the 1960s. In 1994 CPR left Saint John when it sold the line to shortline operator New Brunswick Southern Railway. The Canadian National Railway still services Saint John with a secondary mainline from Moncton. Despite these setbacks, Port Saint John is the largest port by volume in Eastern Canada, at about 28 million metric tonnes of cargo per year, including containers and bulk cargo.

The Irving Oil Refinery is the largest in Canada

=== Exports ===
Saint John is a major exporter to the United States, with 96.3% of the city's exports being sent past the border according to the Canadian Chamber of Commerce. This was particularly highlighted in light of U.S. President Donald Trump's tariff threats against the country, with research by the Canadian Chamber of Commerce concluding that Saint John is the most vulnerable Canadian city in the potentiality of a trade war between both countries, with a trade exposure index of 131.1%, nearly 50% higher than the second-ranked city of Calgary. The study highlighted the Irving Oil Refinery, noting that over 80% of its exports go to the United States. Irving announced a tariff response plan as a result of this, in which all tariff costs on oil exported to the country will be absorbed by U.S. customers.

== Culture ==
The city is the birthplace of several notable artists, actors and musicians, including Walter Pidgeon, Donald Sutherland, Louis B. Mayer, and Miller Brittain. The so-called golden age of the Saint John arts community was during the post-war era from 1940 to 1970 when the city produced renowned artists and writers such as poet Kay Smith; painters Jack Humphrey, Miller Brittain, Bruno Bobak, and Fred Ross; sculptor John Hooper; and folk-singer Stompin' Tom Connors. Poet Bliss Carman once wrote about Saint John, "All the beauty and mystery Of life were there, adventure bold, Youth, and the glamour of the sea, And all its sorrows old."

Arts organizations include InterAction School of Performing Arts, New Brunswick Youth Orchestra, Symphony New Brunswick, The Imperial Theatre, and the Saint John Free Public Library, among others.

=== Film and television ===
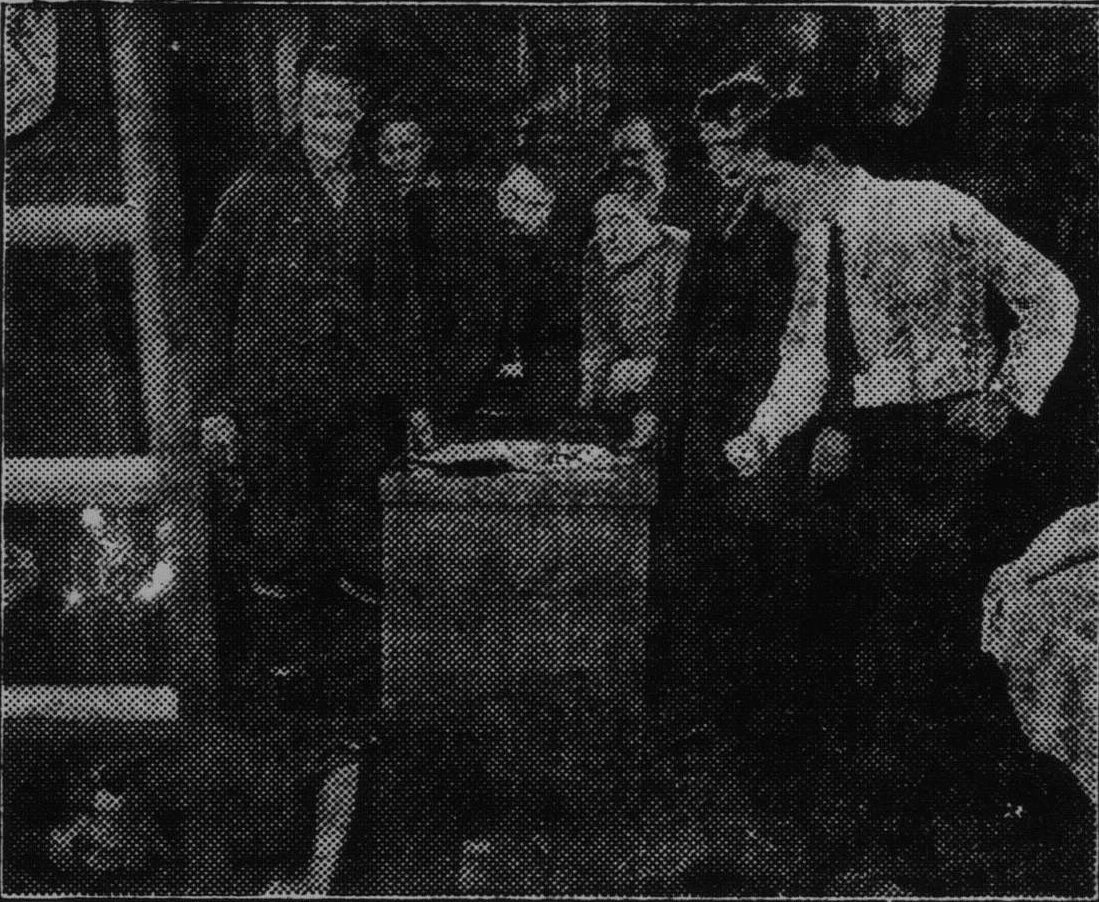
Snippet of lost film Blue Water (1924) from a newspaper advertisement

Saint John, as well as New Brunswick as a whole, entered the film industry in 1924 with the now-lost silent film Blue Water, produced by the once-successful Ernest Shipman. The film featured soon-to-be Hollywood star Norma Shearer, though it had a short-lived screening and failed to succeed commercially. Saint John made a return to film with the Bravery in the Field (1979), a short drama film by the National Film Board of Canada both set and filmed in the city, which was nominated for an Academy Award for Best Live Action Short Film.

Saint John was notably one of the filming locations for Children of a Lesser God (1986), a romance drama film that received five nominations at the 59th Academy Awards. Marlee Matlin, in her film debut, won Best Actress, making her not only the youngest Best Actress winner but also the first Deaf winner in Oscar history. William Hurt, who made a return to the city for filming The 4th Floor (1999), befriended some Saint John residents during his time there for filming of Children of a Lesser God. Other films shot in Saint John include The Secret Life of Algernon (1997), crime drama Blue Hill Avenue (2001), Jericho Mansions (2003), Geraldine's Fortune (2004), black comedy thriller Stuck (2007), romantic drama Still Mine (2012), and Steven Bernstein's depiction of Welsh poet Dylan Thomas Last Call (2017), of which most extras were from Saint John. Additionally, filming for Taylor Olson's What We Dreamed of Then (2025) took place in the city between April and May 2024.

In television, Saint John was featured in an episode of Hotel Impossible, as well as in ARD television documentary Verrückt nach Meer. Saint John was additionally a filming location for Canada Russia '72 (2006), a docudrama miniseries about the Summit Series. Saint John was one of several filming locations within southeastern New Brunswick for Aaron B. Koontz's Revival (2025).

=== Museums ===
Saint John is home to the New Brunswick Museum, Canada's oldest continuing museum, which was first opened in 1842 by Abraham Pineo Gesner as Gesner’s Museum of Natural History. The museum's Archives and Research Library contains approximately 45,000 monographs. Currently, New Brunswick Museum is undergoing a major revitalization project that will include a new 134,000-square-foot facility attached to the current building.

Other museums include the Saint John Jewish Historical Museum, the Hatheway Labour Exhibit Centre, the New Brunswick Black History Society's Black History Heritage Centre located in the Brunswick Square mall, the Saint John Firefighters Museum, the Saint John Police Museum, and formerly Barbour's General Store, which was demolished in 2023 following excessive fire damage the previous year.

=== National Historic sites ===
Saint John is home to several National Historic Sites, including war fortifications such as the Carleton Martello Tower, a War of 1812 masonry tower, Fort Menagoueche, a former French fort from Father Le Loutre's War, Fort Howe, a British fort built during the American Revolution, and Fort La Tour. Other sites include the Imperial Theatre, the Loyalist House, the Saint John City Market, Partridge Island, the Prince William Streetscape, the Saint John Firefighters' Museum and the Bank of New Brunswick.

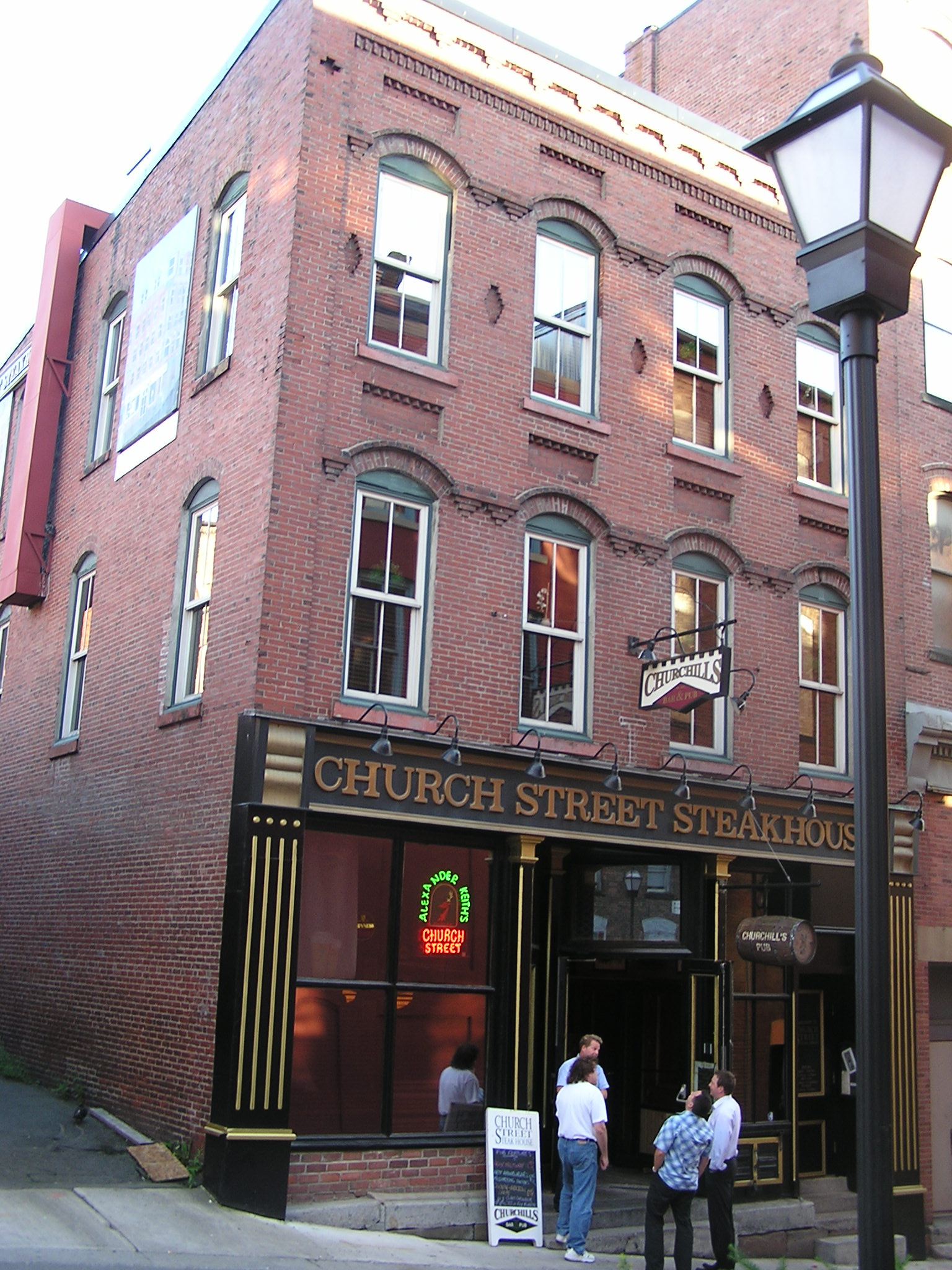
Saint John is known for its pub and restaurant scene throughout uptown. Statistics Canada found the city has the third most pubs per capita in Canada

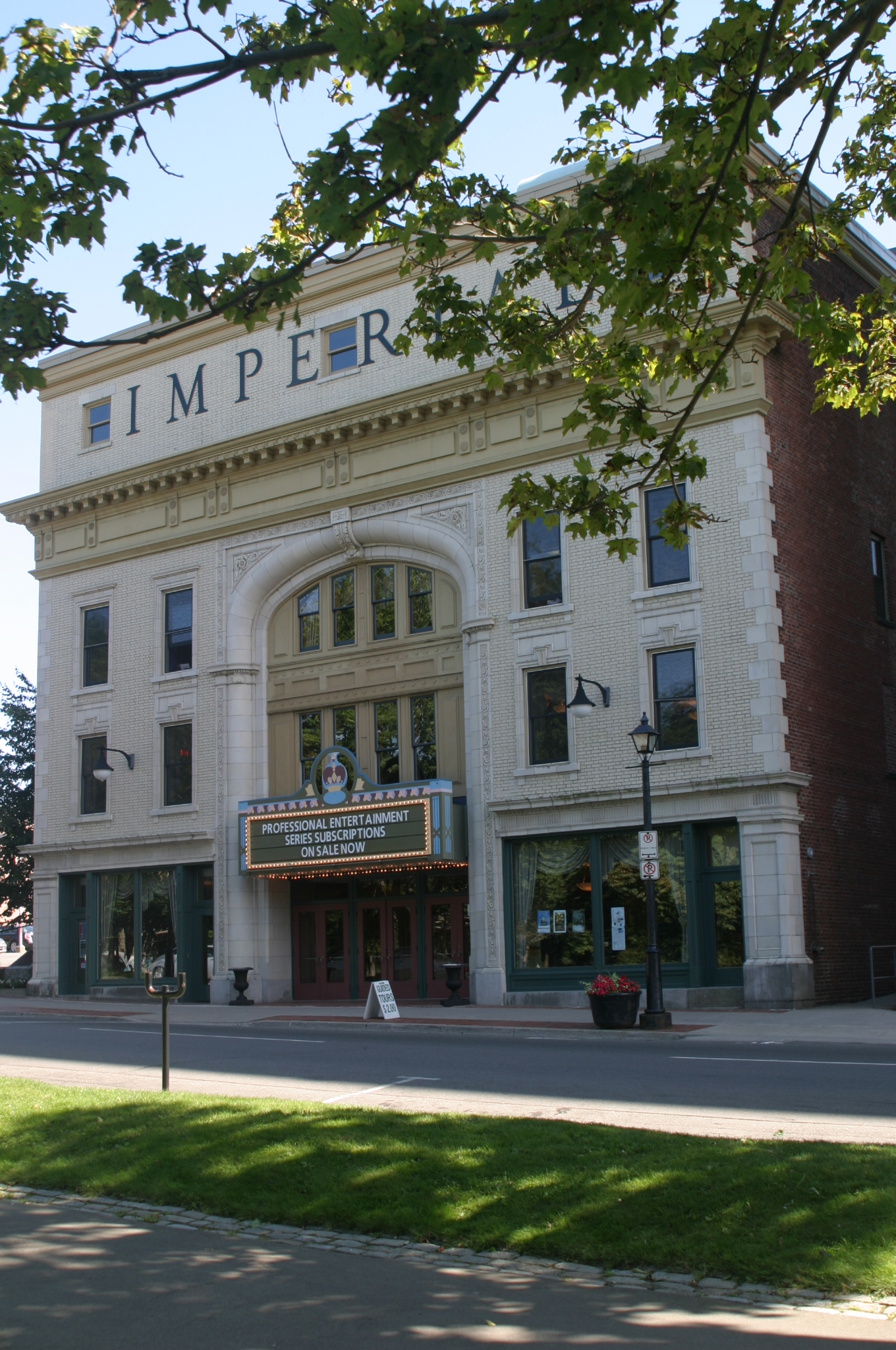
The Imperial Theatre, a National Historic Site still hosting live performances

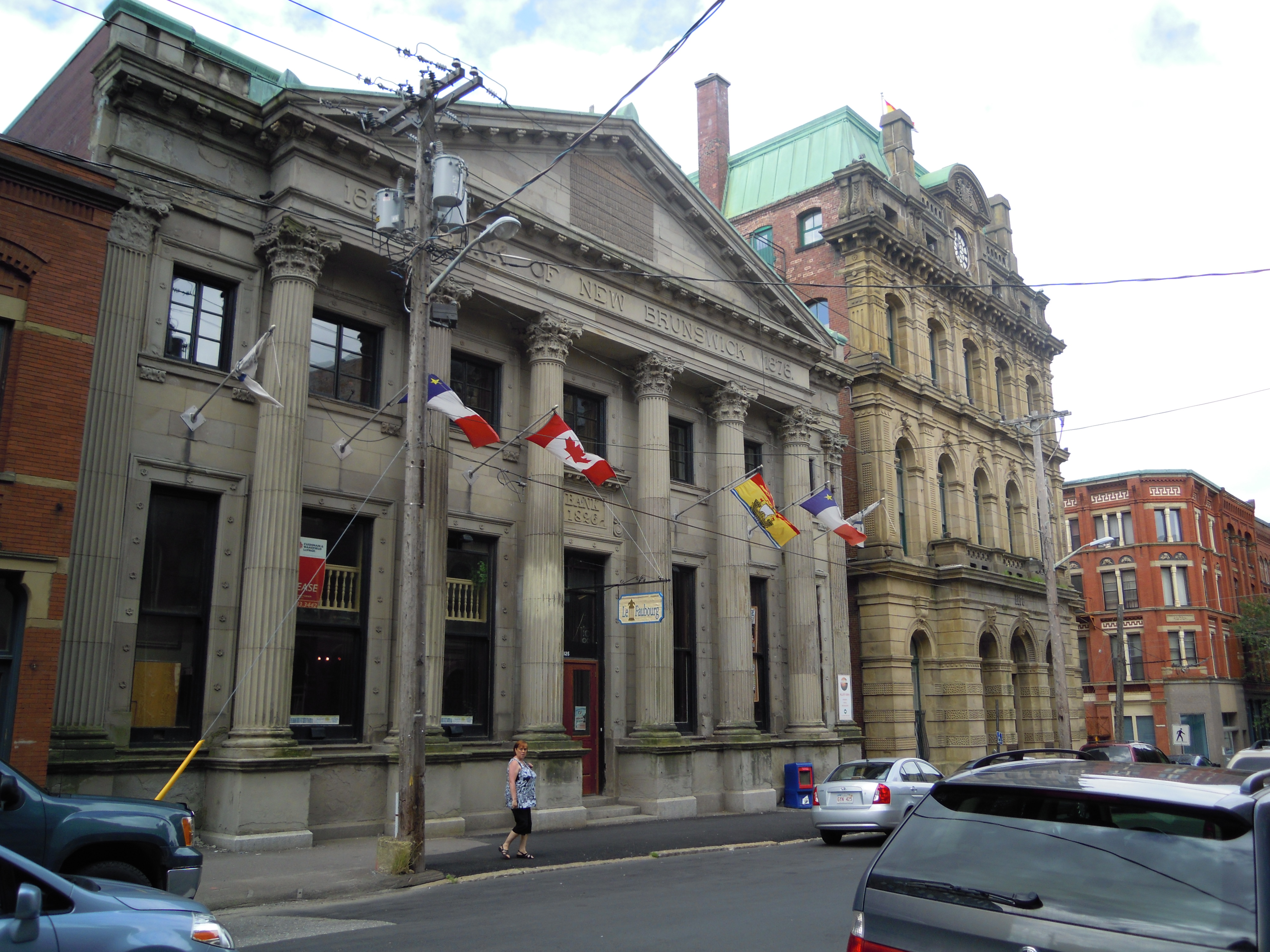
Prince William Street, National Historic Site of Canada. The building in the foreground in the Bank of New Brunswick building, Canada's first bank established by Royal Charter

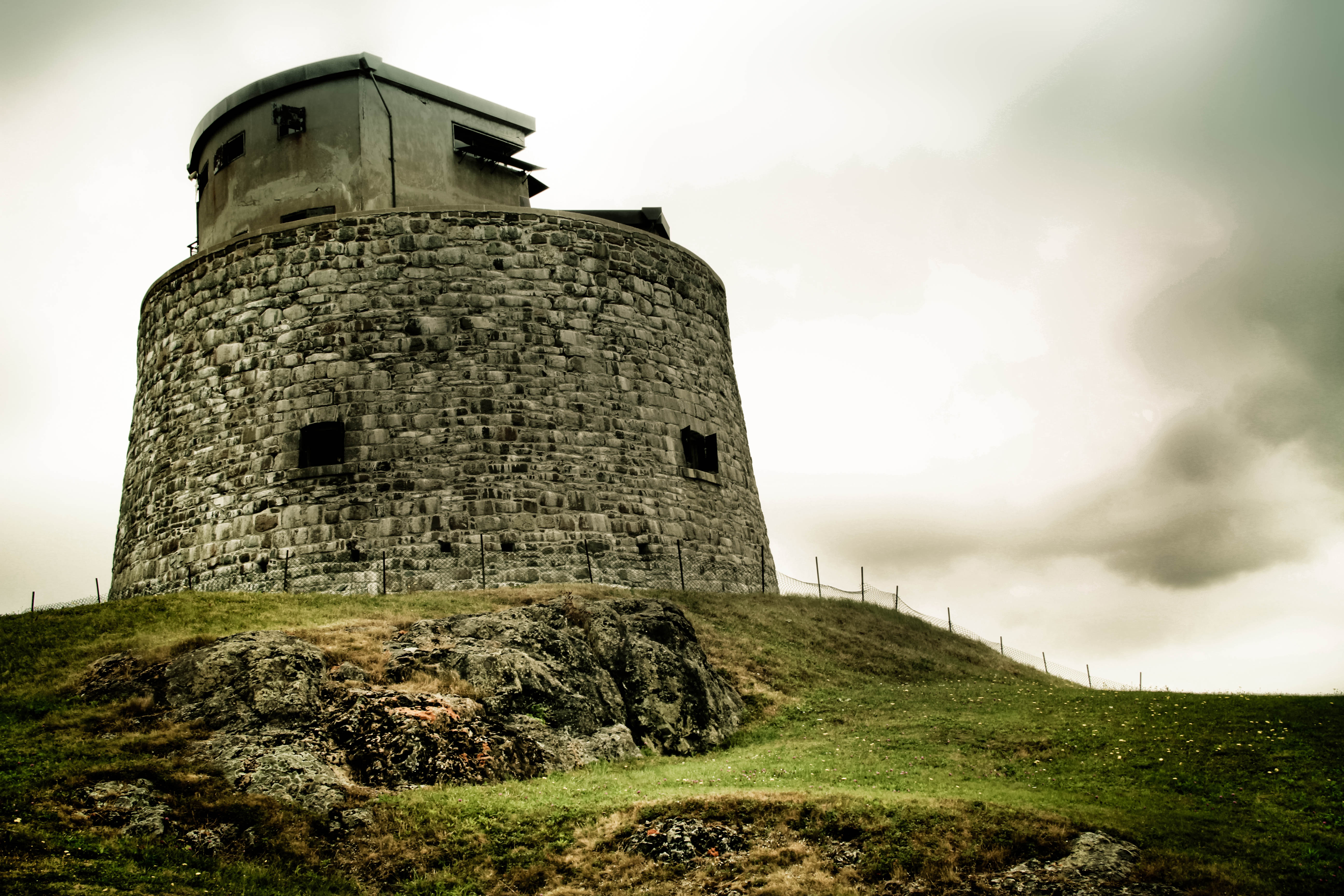
The Carleton Martello Tower, a Martello tower dating from the War of 1812

=== Music ===
Early settlers influenced music in Saint John from the time the area had been a series of forts for the English and French colonists. Working class fishers, labourers and shipbuilders carried Maritime traditions and folk songs with kitchen parties and outdoor gatherings. But musical high culture was captured by the wealthy. New Brunswick's solicitor-general 1784–1808, Ward Chipman Sr was known to have fancy soirées at his home with all the latest songs from London. A notable Loyalist musician, Stephen Humbert, moved in 1783 from New Jersey to Saint John and opened a Sacred Vocal Music School. In 1801 Humbert published Union Harmony, the first Canadian music book in English. The Mechanics' Institute, built in 1840, was the first large-scale platform for comic opera and concerts. In 1950 The Saint John Symphony was founded by Kelsey Jones; by 1983 the organization became Symphony New Brunswick. Some musicians from Saint John include Berkley Chadwick, Stompin' Tom Connors, Ken Tobias, Blank Banshee, Stevedore Steve, Jane Coop, Bruce Holder, Frances James, songwriter Michael F. Kelly, Ned Landry, composer and teacher Edward Betts Manning, organist Paul Murray, Catherine McKinnon, Patricia Rideout, Frances C. Robinson, Philip Thomson, and tenor and choir conductor Gordon Wry.

Music festivals have long been a part of the city's cultural scene. New Brunswick's Music Festival was held in Saint John every Spring in the early- to mid-20th century. As the city's music changed with the times, so did its festivals. Other popular festivals include the now defunct Festival By The Sea and Salty Jam catering to various genres of pop music.

The Area 506 music festival is held every New Brunswick Day long-weekend at the Area 506 Festival grounds located near the Area 506 Container Village on Saint John Harbour along Water street. The festival is set up with shipping containers from the port with vendors from New Brunswick companies to promote local business. A main stage area is also set up for night time shows with local acts as well as major groups. Major bands to have played Area 506 include Interpol, Billy Talent, Alexisonfire, Mother Mother, Arkells, Metric, City and Colour, The Beaches and more. Each year the festival also includes a bevy of bands coming out of the Saint John music scene. Quality Block Party music festival hosts independent New Brunswick musicians in smaller venues throughout uptown Saint John. The festival gets its name from the old quality block on Germain Street.

== Government and politics ==
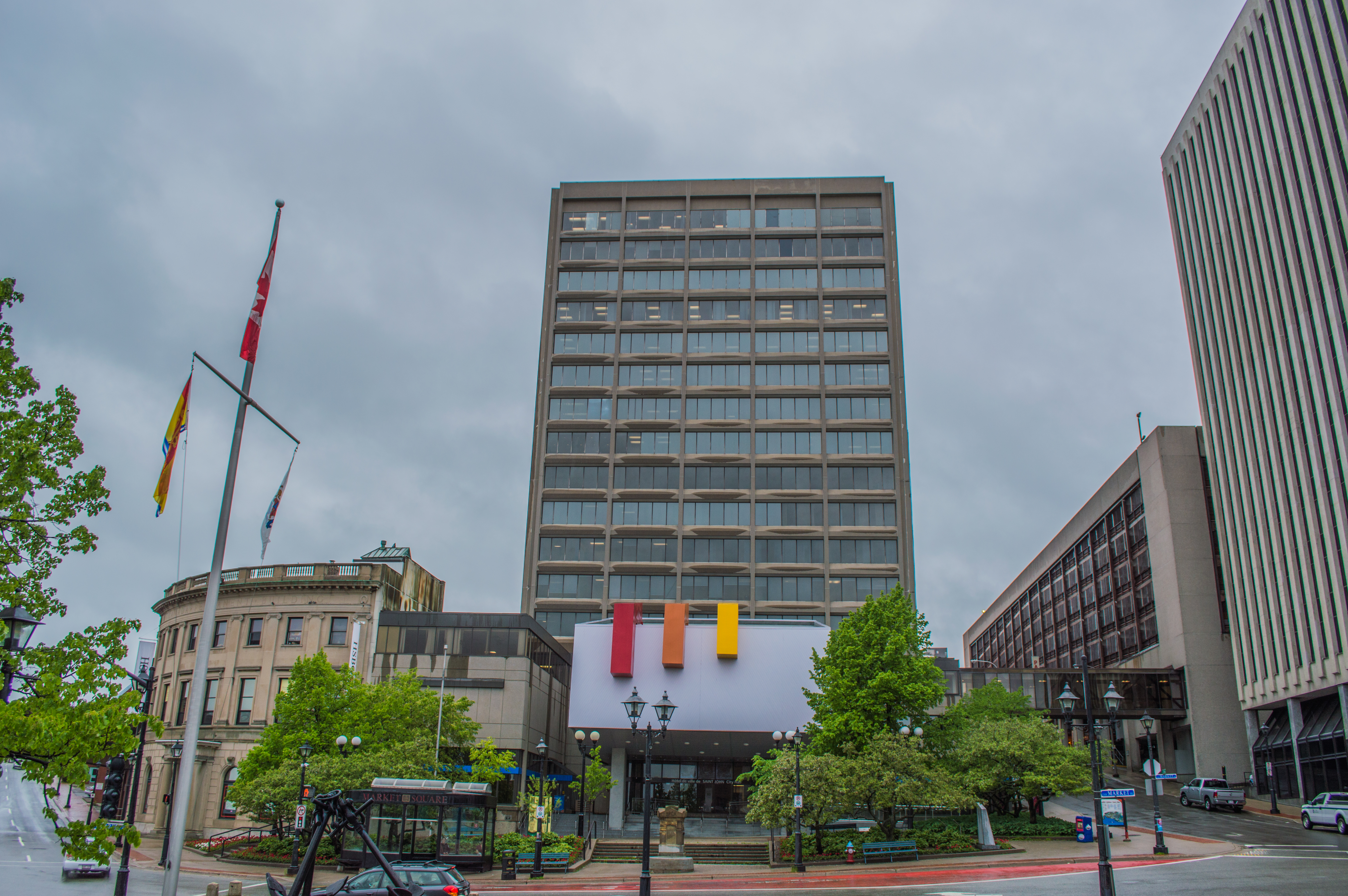
Saint John City Hall

=== Government and court ===
Saint John operates under a mayor–council form of municipal government, officially known as the Saint John Common Council. The council consists of the mayor and ten councillors, of which two are elected at-large and eight represent the city's four wards to four-year terms. Saint John is one of five chartered cities in Canada, giving it unique legislative powers. Federally, it is part of the Saint John—Kennebecasis and Saint John—St. Croix ridings represented in the House of Commons by Liberal MP Wayne Long and Conservative MP John Williamson, respectively.

Saint John is served by the Provincial Court of New Brunswick, the province's lower trial court. Saint John is also home to the provincial court's mental health court. The Chief Judge for the Provincial Court is Marco Cloutier. The city falls within the Judicial District of Saint John for the Court of King's Bench of New Brunswick.

=== Politics ===
The office of the mayor has been held by Donna Reardon since 2021. Elected during the 2021 New Brunswick municipal electionss, she is the 79th mayor of Saint John. Previous mayors include Robert Duncan Wilmot, one of the Fathers of Confederation and a Lieutenant Governor of New Brunswick, Legislative Council of New Brunswick and Senate of Canada member John Robertson, Bank of New Brunswick director and Liberal House of Commons of Canada member Jeremiah Smith Boies De Veber, physician and Senate of Canada member John Waterhouse Daniel, and Minister of National Revenue David Laurence MacLaren.

The Saint John City Council consists of the Mayor and ten Councillors. Eight councillors represent four wards (two per ward) and must be residents of the wards in which they are nominated. The other two are Councillors-at-Large elected by the entire city.

== Public safety ==
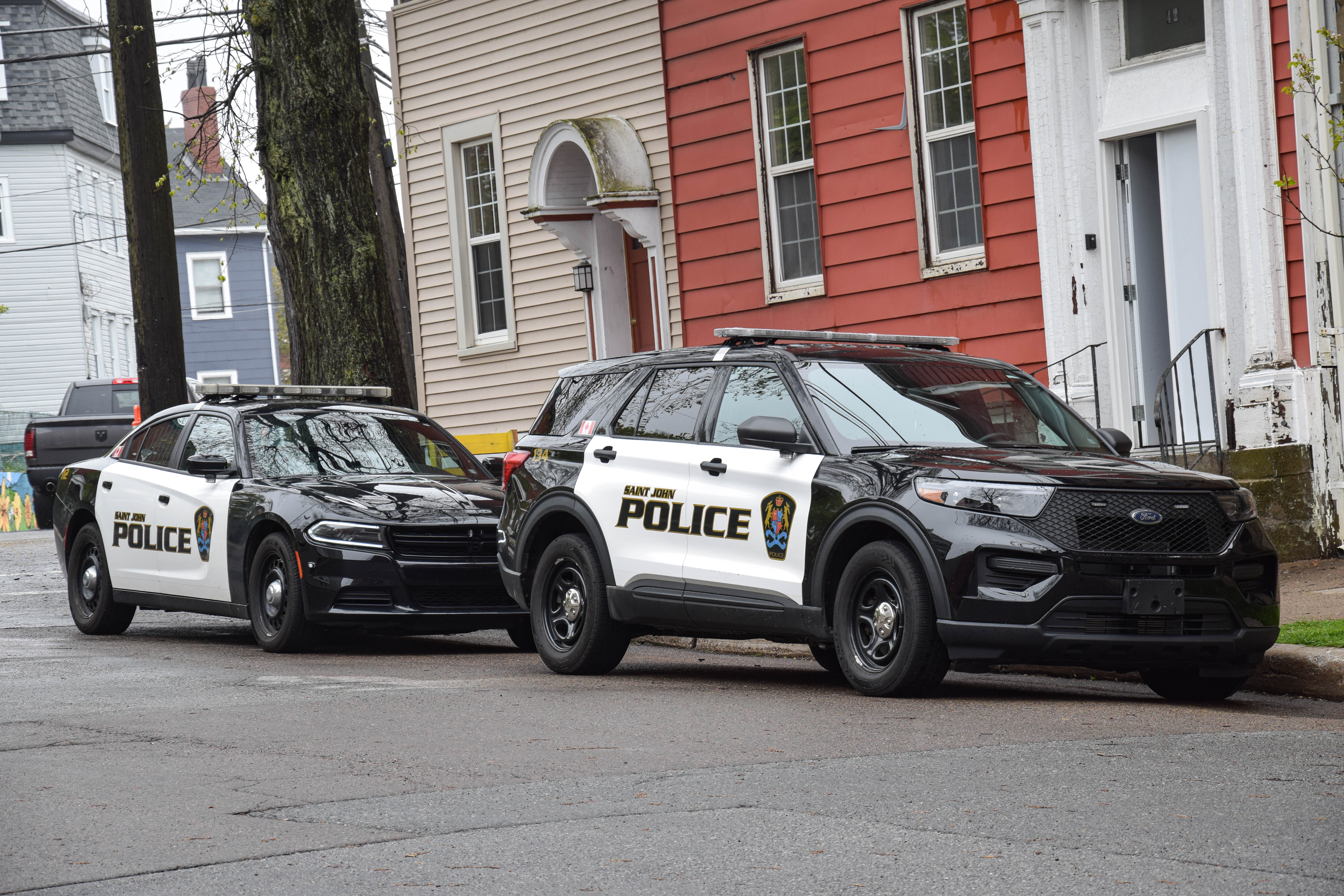
Saint John Police utility vehicles

=== Police and law enforcement ===
Saint John's law enforcement agency is the Saint John Police Force. It was established in 1849, though police forces in the city date back to 1809. As of 31 December 2023, the police force had 126 sworn officers and 55 civilian staff members. The Saint John Police Force is governed by the Saint John Board of Police Commissioners.

The Saint John Police Force was originally based in the City Hall building from 1971 until 2012, when a new police headquarters was built at Peel Plaza. In 1977, while still based in the City Hall building, a fire was started in the ground floor jail, killing 21 inmates. In April 1998, the police force's north end station was bombed, injuring a number of officers. An attempted bombing also took place near the jail in June 1998, but was defused.

=== Fire department ===
Saint John is served under the firefighters of the Saint John Fire Department, which was established in 1786. As of 2024, the department operates from six fire stations.

=== Military ===
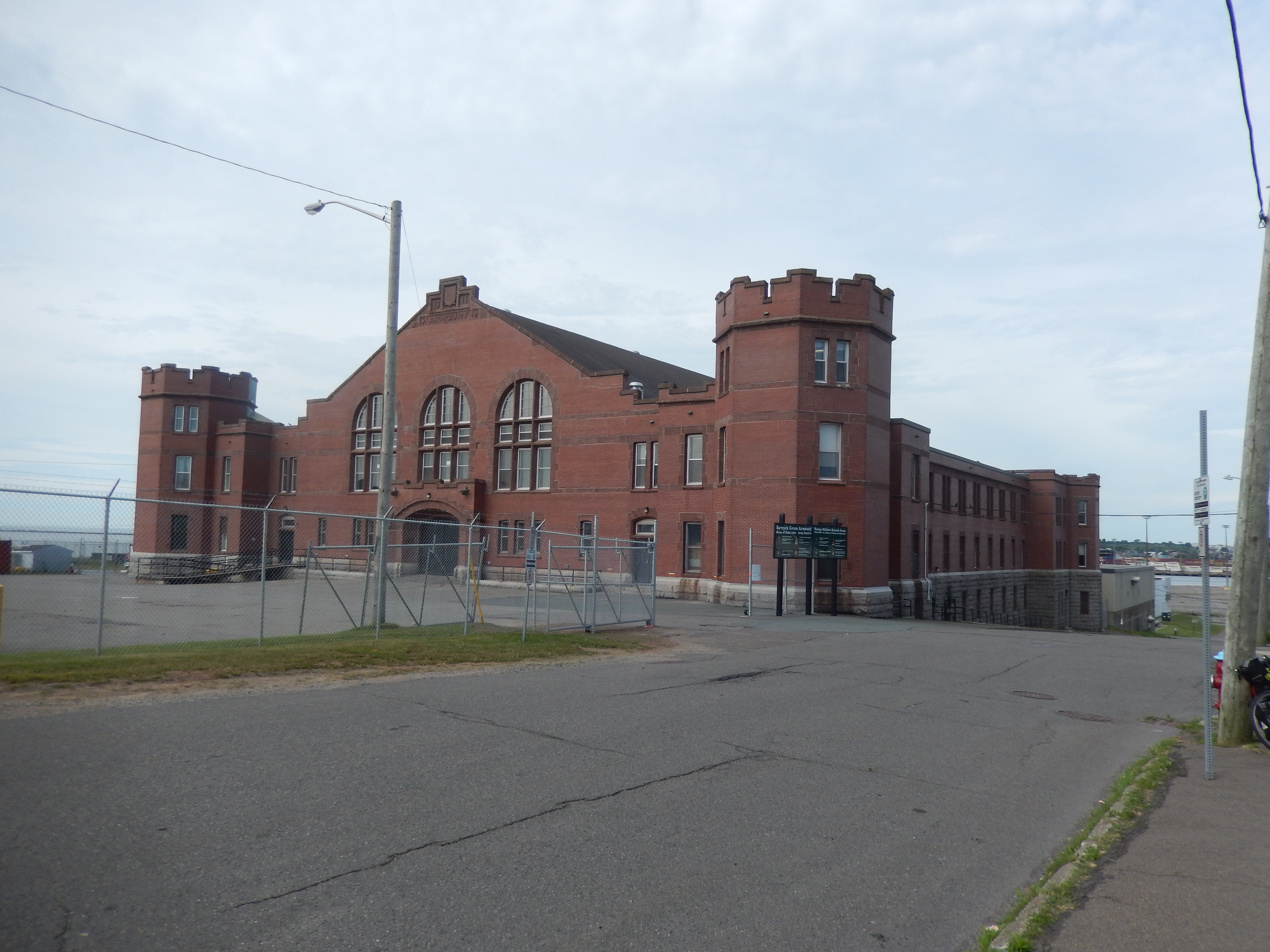
Many of Saint John's military divisions have utilized the Barrack Green Armoury (pictured)

Besides being the location of several historical forts, such as Fort Howe, Fort Dufferin, Fort Latour, and the Carleton Martello Tower, Saint John is the location of a number of reserve units of the Canadian Forces.

- Naval Reserve
  - HMCS Brunswicker
- 37 Canadian Brigade Group
  - 3rd Field Artillery Regiment, RCA: Regimental headquarters and 115th Field Battery (The Loyal Company)
  - Royal New Brunswick Regiment (Carleton & York): B Company
  - 37 Signal Regiment: Det Saint John, and 2 Squadron
  - 37 Service Battalion: Battalion headquarters and a composite logistics company

== Education ==
=== Primary and secondary ===
Saint John is served by two school boards. One is the Anglophone board, known as the Anglophone South School District, one of the four Anglophone K–12 school districts in New Brunswick, and headquartered in Saint John. The other school board is the Francophone board, named the Francophone Sud School District, which is based out of Dieppe and serves Saint John's only Francophone school, École Samuel-de-Champlain.

There are 25 public K–12 schools in Saint John, with 24 being anglophone and one being francophone. The city is home to Saint John High School, Canada's oldest publicly funded high school. There is also Harbour View High School, St. Malachy's Memorial High School, and Simonds High School.

=== Post-secondary ===
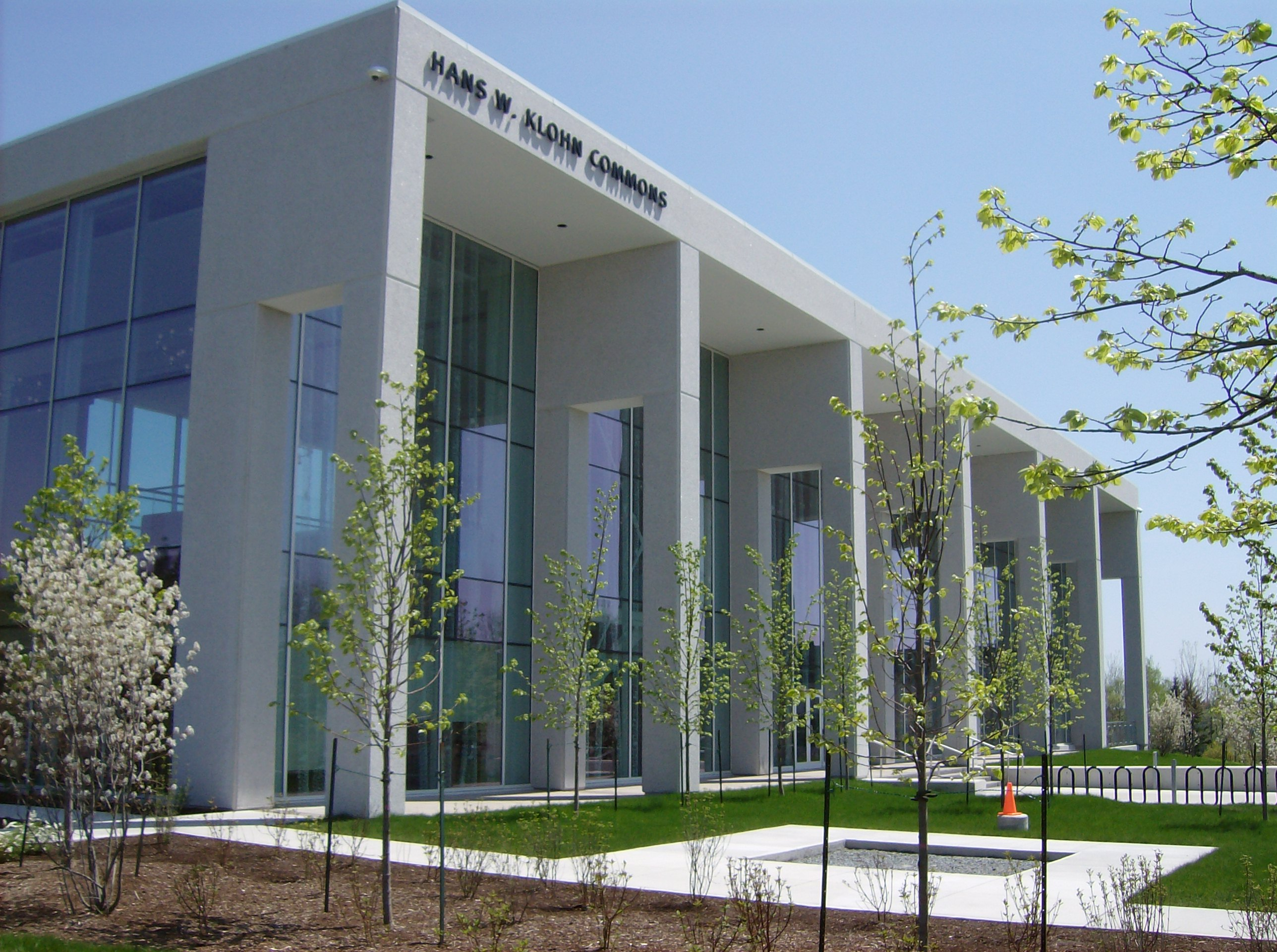
The Hans W. Klohn Commons at the University of New Brunswick

Saint John is home to a number of post-secondary institutions, including the smaller of the two campuses of the University of New Brunswick, the Saint John campus (UNBSJ). Opened in 1969 and located next to the Saint John Regional Hospital near Millidgeville, the campus serves around 2,000 of UNB's total student body. As a result of its proximity to the hospital, the Saint John campus also houses Dalhousie Medicine New Brunswick for Dalhousie University as well as the Gerald S Merrithew Allied Health Education Centre for the provincial community college. Saint John also contains one of the campuses for the New Brunswick Community College as well as a campus for Eastern College.

In the fall of 2007, a report commissioned by the provincial government recommended UNBSJ and the NBCC be reformed and consolidated into a new polytechnic post-secondary institute. The proposal immediately came under heavy criticism and led to the organizing of several protests in the uptown area, citing the diminishment of UNB as a nationally accredited university, the reduction in accessibility to receive degrees – and these are only a couple of the reasons why the community was enraged by the recommendation. Support for keeping UNBSJ as it was, and expanding the university under its current structure, fell slightly below 90%. Seeing too much political capital would be lost, and several Saint John MPs were likely not to support the initiative if the policies recommended by the report were legislated, the government abandoned the commission's report and created an intra-provincial post-secondary commission.

=== Public library system ===
First opening on 18 May 1883, the Saint John Free Public Library was among Canada's first free libraries. It first operated out of the Saint John City Market with a book inventory of 2,885. It temporarily relocated to the Saint John Masonic Temple before moving to a building funded by Andrew Carnegie and constructed in 1904, where it operated until moving to its present location in Market Square in 1983. The library currently maintains three branches.

== Labour ==
=== Canada's first trade union ===
Saint John is often described as the birthplace of unionism in Canada and is one of the few pre-capitalist colonial settlements in North America. The city has a history of labour achievements and sparked the Canadian labour movement with Canada's first trade union, the Labourers' Benevolent Association (now International Longshoremen's Association Local 273). In 1849 the union was formed when Saint John's longshoremen banded together to lobby for regular pay and a shorter workday. One of their first resolutions was to apply to the city council for permission to erect the bell, which would announce the beginning and end of the labourers' 10-hour workday. As the bell shears were hardly finished when capitalists and merchants in the city objected to the bell and successfully lobbied city hall to keep the bell from being put up. But then, citizens and longshoremen defied the order and erected a larger bell and merchants withdrew their opposition to the "Labourers' Bell". ILA Local 273 remain one of the city's strongest trade unions to this day.

=== The Saint John Street Railwaymen's strike and riot of 1914 ===
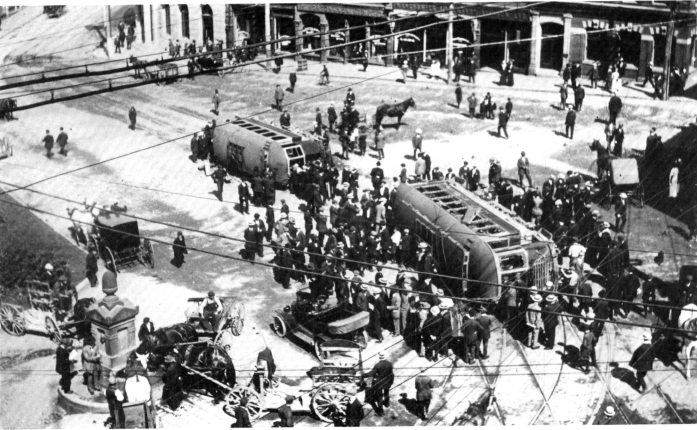
1914 Saint John Railwaymen's Strike riot

The 1914 Saint John street railway strike (sometimes called the Saint John street railwaymen's strike) was a strike by workers on the street railway system in the city which lasted from 22 to 24 July 1914, with rioting by Saint John inhabitants occurring on 23 and 24 July. The strike was important for shattering the image of Saint John as a conservative town dominated primarily by ethnic and religious (rather than class) divisions, and highlighting tensions between railway industrialists and the local working population.

=== 14 October 1976: The Saint John General Strike ===
The Saint John General Strike of 1976 was a result of the Bill C-73 passed by Prime Minister of Canada, Pierre Elliott Trudeau, and the House of Commons in Ottawa on 14 October 1975. This bill limited wage increases to 8% the first year, 6% the second year, and 4% the third year after its enactment. Most provinces of Canada accepted the bill by spring of 1976, but within eighteen months they began to withdraw from the program. After its introduction in 1975, it was not until 1976 that the Anti-Inflation Board (AIB) began to roll back workers' wages. The employees of Irving Pulp and Paper, members of the Canadian Paper Workers Union, were among the first to experience the roll backs implemented by the AIB. The paper workers were required to give back to the employer 9.8% of their previous wage increase the first year, and 11% the second year. The Atlantic Sugar Refinery workers of the Bakery and Confectionary Workers International Union of America soon felt the burden as well. The majority of workers within Saint John were influenced by the AIB by January 1976. On 5 February 1976, the Saint John District and the Labour Council held a conference to plan an organized opposition to the AIB. Fifty-two people came to the meeting as representatives of twenty-six unions in Saint John. The council was led by the Labour Council president, George Vair. They began by educating those present on wage control legislation, but swiftly transitioned into rallying and demonstrating in opposition throughout the city. Five thousand marched from numerous ends of the town to King Square. All major industries in Saint John were shut down.

=== The Irving Oil Refinery strike, 1994–1996 ===
On 12 May 1994, at 4:30 pm, members of Local 691 of the Communications, Energy and Paperworkers (CEP) union at the Irving Oil Ltd. Refinery went on strike. At this time the refinery's management took over its operations. Irving had argued the refinery might have to shut down and had to bring in a bevy of rollbacks to the workers' pay and benefits and other changes to the collective agreement. Local 691 argued Irving simply wished to lengthen the work week without paying workers overtime rates. The strike lasted 27 months and was based on Irving's demands for flexibility of the workers to ensure the refinery was competitive. The strike is seen as symbolic of a rollback of labour and democratic collective bargaining rights that have been in decline across North America.

== Media ==
=== Print ===
Saint John's daily newspaper is the Telegraph-Journal, which was previously owned by J. D. Irving under their Saint John-based publishing company Brunswick News, until its acquisition by Postmedia Network in 2022. The newspaper was created in 1923, following the merger of The Daily Journal and The Daily Telegraph and The Sun, which itself was created from the merging of The Sun and Daily Telegraph. Additionally, the University of New Brunswick Saint John campus (UNBSJ) has a student newspaper The Baron. The city was also home to Huddle, a business news website which published from 2015 to 2023.

One of the first Black Canadian magazines, Neith, was published in Saint John in 1903–1904 by Abraham Beverley Walker.

=== Television ===
Saint John's television market is served by two stations, those being CHNB-DT (Global) and CKLT-DT (CTV). CHNB-DT is operated in Brunswick Square.

=== Radio ===
Saint John is served by both anglophone and francophone radio stations, with all but one being FM broadcast. Music stations include CHWV-FM, (hot adult contemporary), CIOK-FM (adult contemporary), CJRP-FM (Christian contemporary), CJYC-FM (classic hits), CHNI-FM (classic/active rock), CHSJ-FM and CFBC (both country), and CINB-FM (oldies/classic hits). Francophone stations include CHQC-FM (community radio) as well as two other rebroadcast stations CBAL-FM-4 (classical/jazz music) and CBAF-FM-1 (news/talk). The third rebroadcast station in the city, CBZ-FM, is anglophone.

Saint John also has one anglophone news/talk station CBD-FM as well as one campus radio station CFMH-FM for the University of New Brunswick Saint John campus (UNBSJ).

== Transportation ==
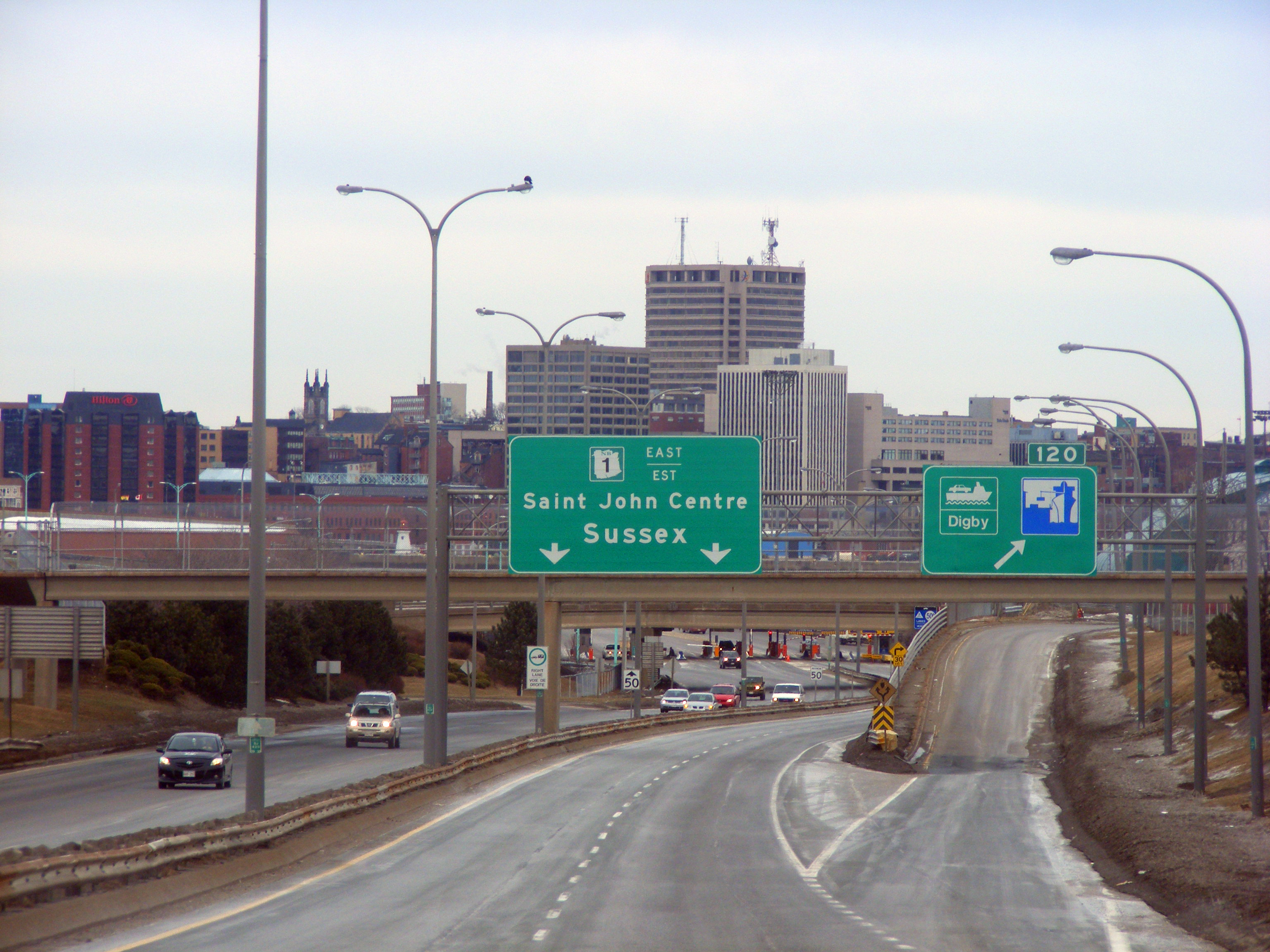
Looking east on the Saint John Throughway, right before the Harbour Bridge and the now closed (since 2011) toll plaza

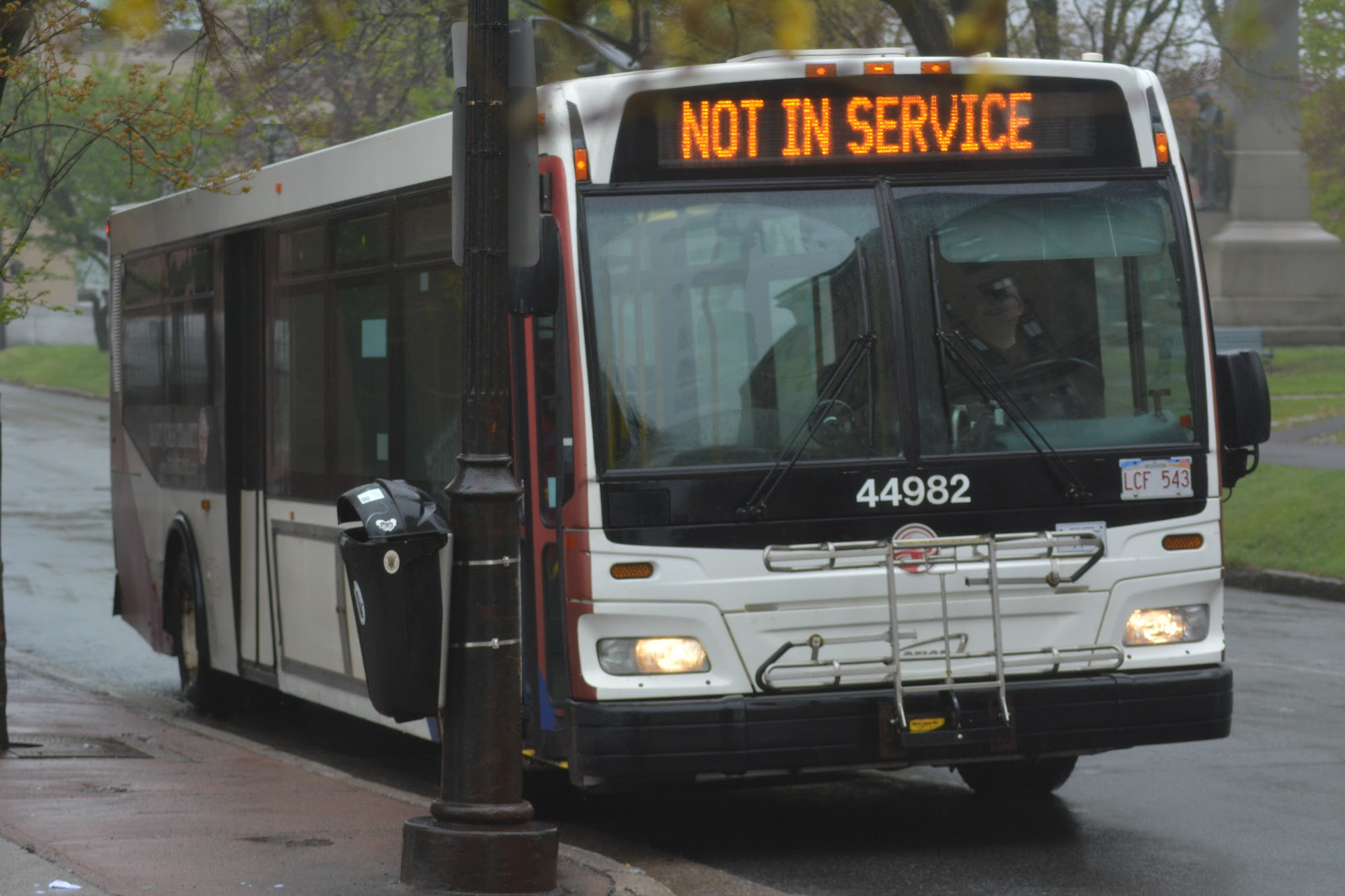
A Saint John Transit bus in uptown

=== Air ===
Air service into Saint John is provided by the Saint John Airport, near Loch Lomond 8 nautical miles (15 km; 9.2 mi) east northeast of the central business district or approximately 25 km (16 mi) by road northeast of the city centre. Flights are offered by Sunwing Airlines (seasonal) and Air Canada (Air Canada Express and Air Canada Rouge). In 2011, WestJet decided to withdraw from the Saint John Airport. Quebec-based Pascan Aviation announced its expansion into Saint John in late 2012, with direct flights from Saint John to Quebec City, Newfoundland, and other destinations beginning in September 2012. Porter Airlines flies once daily from Saint John, to Ottawa and Toronto Island Airport.

=== Highways ===
The main highway in the city is the Saint John Throughway (Route 1). Route 1 extends west to the United States border, and northeast towards both Prince Edward Island and Nova Scotia. A second major highway, Route 7, connects Saint John with Fredericton. There are two main road crossings over the Saint John River: the Harbour Bridge and the Reversing Falls Bridge, approximately 1 nautical mile (1.9 km) upstream.

=== Rail ===
Prior to 1918, rail travel to and from Saint John would be carried out through the Intercolonial Railway.

The Reversing Falls Railway Bridge carries rail traffic for the New Brunswick Southern Railway on the route from Saint John to Maine. Saint John was serviced by the "Atlantic" Line of Via Rail passenger service. Passenger rail service in Saint John was discontinued in December 1994, although the Canadian National Railway and New Brunswick Southern Railway continue to provide freight service. Passenger service to Halifax may restart under a new proposal.

=== Port and ferries ===
Port Saint John is located where the Saint John River meets the Atlantic Ocean. Thus both the ocean and the river system is navigable from Saint John docks. Bay Ferries operates a ferry service, MV Fundy Rose, across the Bay of Fundy to Digby, Nova Scotia.

The Summerville-Millidgeville Ferry, a seasonal toll-free ferry service operated by the New Brunswick Department of Transportation, connects the Millidgeville neighbourhood with Summerville, located across the Kennebecasis River on the Kingston Peninsula. Operating from April until the winter season, the service uses the Peninsula Princess, a ferry which, unlike other toll-free ferries in the region, is self-propelled rather than a cable ferry.

=== Public transit ===
Saint John Transit is the largest transit system in New Brunswick in both area coverage and ridership. Bus service is provided by Saint John Transit (Greater Saint John Area) and Maritime Bus (Inter-city). Acadian Lines used to operate regular inter-city bus services between New Brunswick, Prince Edward Island, Nova Scotia, Bangor, as well as Rivière-du-Loup, Quebec (connecting with Orléans Express). Maritime Bus has since replaced Acadian Lines as the regional bus service.

== Sports ==
Saint John has been home to multiple provincial, junior league and professional sports teams, including the Saint John Sea Dogs (Quebec Maritimes Junior Hockey League), the former Saint John Riptide (National Basketball League of Canada), the Saint John Irish (New Brunswick Rugby Union), the Saint John Trojans (New Brunswick Rugby Union), and the Saint John Alpines (New Brunswick Senior Baseball League). The Port City Power, an upcoming professional basketball team and the first Canadian team that will be in The Basketball League, is also based in Saint John.

The following sporting events have been held in Saint John:

- The 2022 Memorial Cup, the national tournament of the Canadian Hockey League took place here after two years of absence due to the pandemic, with the Saint John Sea Dogs winning the championship.
- The Saint John Flames of the AHL played here from 1993 to 2003, winning the Calder Cup in 2000–2001
- 1999 World Curling Championships (Men and Women) & 2014 World Women's Curling Championship
- 1998 World Junior Figure Skating Championships
- 1997 AHL All-Star Game
- 1995 Skate Canada International
- 1988 World Blitz Chess Championship
- 1985 Canada Games
- 1926 World Speed Skating Championship

Collegiately, Saint John is home to the ACAA UNB Saint John Seawolves, the athletic team representing UNBSJ. The team has six varsity sports: basketball, soccer and volleyball, for both men and women.

== Twin/sister cities ==
- Bangor, Maine, United States (1987).
- Shantou, China (1997).
- Donghae, South Korea (2008).
- Koper, Slovenia (2009).
- Newport, Rhode Island, United States.

== See also ==
- List of people from Saint John, New Brunswick
- Bank of New Brunswick: the first chartered bank in Canada.
- The Paris Crew: Canada's first international sporting champions (rowing), 1867.

== Notes ==
=== Works cited ===
- Jack, David Russell, ed. (October 1903). "Acadiensis". Acadiensis. III (4). Saint John, New Brunswick – via Canadiana.ca.
