= Brigitte Clavette =

Canadian artist, metalsmith and educator

- Born: Saint-Basile, New Brunswick, Canada
- Education: NSCAD University
- Known for: metal smithing
- Awards: Strathbutler Award (2004); Saidye Bronfman Award (2022)
- Elected: Royal Canadian Academy of Arts (2000)
- Website: brigitteclavette.ca

Brigitte Clavette is a Canadian artist, metalsmith and educator based in Fredericton, New Brunswick. Born in Saint-Basile, New Brunswick, Clavette studied jewelry design and silversmithing at the Nova Scotia College of Art and Design. Since 1985 she has taught jewelry and metal arts at the New Brunswick College of Craft and Design. She has also taught at Nunavut Arctic College and the Haliburton School of Fine Arts.

Clavette entered the Nova Scotia College of Art and Design in 1977. Inspired by the work of the Canadian silversmith Lois Betteridge, she studied jewelry design and metal smithing. She has described her metalwork as being primarily influenced by "religion and rituals".

Clavette was elected to the Royal Canadian Academy of Arts in 2000. In 2006 she won the Strathbutler Award, an annual prize for visual arts in New Brunswick. In 2015 her design for a sterling silver and copper knife won a competition for an "iconic presentation piece" to be presented to all Strathbutler winners. In 2017 Clavette was awarded the City of Fredericton's Arts Achievement Award. Her work is in the Royal Ontario Museum, Victoria Albert, New Brunswick Museum, and the Guelph Art Gallery's contemporary silversmithing collection.

Clavette is the 2022 Saidye Bronfman Award winner.
