= Anna Torma =

Canadian artist (born 1952)

- Born: 1952 (age 73–74); Tarnaörs, Hungary
- Known for: fabric artist

Anna Torma RCA (born 1952) is a Hungarian-Canadian fibre artist.

== Work ==
Torma specializes in large-scale hand embroideries, and her work draws upon multiple artistic and textile techniques, including appliqué, felting, photo transfer, collage, and quilting. She appropriates visual imagery from multiple sources, including anatomical drawings, folk art, and her children's drawings. She combines traditional methods of the Hungarian textile tradition with the radical reclamation of craft art forms from the avant-garde feminist movements of the 1960s and 1970s.

== Life and career ==
Torma was born in 1952 in Tarnaörs, Hungary. She learned to embroider from her mother and grandmothers and studied textile art and design at the Hungarian Academy of Applied Arts (1974–1979). She received a degree in Textile Art and Design from the Hungarian University of Applied Arts, Budapest, Hungary in 1979. She immigrated to Canada in 1988. Torma was a 2007 Artist-in-Residence at the McColl Center for Art + Innovation in Charlotte, North Carolina.

Torma has exhibited throughout Canada, the United States, and Europe, and her work is held by the Beaverbrook Art Gallery, the New Brunswick Art Bank, the Museum of Arts and Design, the Art Gallery of Nova Scotia, Mint Museum of Craft and Design, Owens Art Gallery, and the New Brunswick Museum. Anna Torma: Permanent Danger, a major solo exhibition was organized by the Textile Museum of Canada in 2020. This exhibition travelled to the Art Gallery of Guelph (2021), and the Owens Art Gallery, Mount Allison University in Sackville, New Brunswick (2021).

== Recognition ==
In 2008, Anna Torma won the Strathbutler Award from the Sheila Hugh Mackay Foundation. In 2014 she received the Lieutenant-Governor's Award for High Achievement in the Visual Arts. She was the 2020 laureate of the Saidye Bronfman Award (Governor General's Awards in Visual and Media Arts) for excellence in the fine crafts. Anna Torma is a member of the Royal Canadian Academy of Arts.

== Public collections ==
- Art Gallery of Nova Scotia, Halifax, NS
- Beaverbrook Art Gallery, Fredericton, NB
- Mint Museum of Craft and Design, Charlotte, NC
- Mount Saint Vincent University Art Gallery, Halifax, NS
- Museum of Art and Design, New York, NY
- New Brunswick Art Bank, Fredericton, NB
- Owens Art Gallery, Sackville, NB
