= Lieutenant-Governor's Award for High Achievement in the Arts =

New Brunswick Arts Board award

The Lieutenant Governor’s Awards for High Achievement in the Arts
- Description: Recognize the outstanding contributions of New Brunswick artists
- Country: Canada
- Presented by: Lieutenant Governor of New Brunswick

The Lieutenant Governor's Award for High Achievement in the Arts, previously called the Excellence Awards Program, is an award given annually by the New Brunswick Arts Board to recognise outstanding contribution by artists to the arts in New Brunswick.

== Recipients ==
=== High Achievement in Literary Arts ===
Recipients
Year	Recipient	Ref.
2009	Rino Morin Rossignol	
2009	Raymond Fraser	
2010	Beth Powning	
2011	France Daigle	
2012	M. T. Dohaney	
2013	Melvin Gallant	
2014	Anne Compton	
2015	Jacques Savoie	
2016	M. Travis Lane	
2017	Robert Pichette	
2019	Wayne Curtis	
2021	Daniel H. Dugas	
2024	Valerie Sherrard	

=== High Achievement in Performing Arts ===
Recipients
Year	Recipient	Ref.
2009	Marcel-Romain Thériault	
2010	Chantal Cadieux	
2010	Calixte Duguay	
2011	Patrick Clark	
2012	Édith Butler Butler	
2013	Jenny Munday	
2014	Igor Dobrovolskiy	
2015	Jules Boudreau	
2017	Stephen Tobias	
2019	Ray Legere	
2021	Sandra Le Couteur	
2024	Marshall Button	

=== High Achievement in Visual Arts ===
Recipients
Year	Recipient	Ref.
2009	Roméo Savoie	
2011	Yvon Gallant	
2012	David Umholtz	
2013	Janice Wright Cheney	
2014	Anna Torma	
2015	Thaddeus Holownia	
2016	Suzanne Hill	
2017	Peter Powning	
2019	Marie Hélène Allain	
2021	Mathieu Léger	
2024	Phil Comeau	

=== High Achievement in Indigenous Arts ===
Recipients
Year	Recipient	Ref.
2024	Tara Francis	
