= Janice Wright Cheney =

Canadian artist (born 1961)

- Born: 1961; Montreal, Quebec
- Education: Mount Allison University and University of New Brunswick
- Known for: textile artist
- Awards: Strathbutler Award for Excellence in the Arts (2004); Lieutenant-Governor's Award for High Achievement in Visual Arts (2013)
- Elected: Royal Canadian Academy of Arts (2010)
- Website: www.janicewrightcheney.com

Janice Wright Cheney RCA (born 1961) is a Canadian visual artist based in Fredericton, New Brunswick.

== Career ==
Born in Montreal, Quebec, Wright Cheney studied visual arts at Mount Allison University (1983) and Critical Studies in Education at the University of New Brunswick (2003). She teaches at the New Brunswick College of Craft and Design.

Her textile art considers "themes pertaining to natural history and domestic labour". For example, one of her exhibits, Cellar at the Beaverbrook Art Gallery in Fredericton and the Art Gallery of Nova Scotia in Halifax, featured "hundreds of rats created from recycled vintage fur coats". Trespass, featured at the New Brunswick Museum, comprised individual animals and insects such as coyotes, fleas, and a giant squid, all incorporated into other exhibits throughout the museum. Disorderly Creatures at Rodman Hall Art Centre in St. Catharines, Ontario "transfigured insects from signs of shabby housekeeping into objects of beauty and power" by embroidering insects onto linens. Wright Cheney was one of the artists included in the 2012 "Oh, Canada" exhibit of contemporary Canadian art at the Massachusetts Museum of Contemporary Art: her contribution was a "giant, rose-encrusted grizzly bear".

Wright Cheney won the Strathbutler Award for Excellence in the Arts in 2004 and was elected to the Royal Canadian Academy of Arts in 2010. She received the 2013 Lieutenant-Governor's Award for High Achievement in Visual Arts.

Her work is included in the permanent collections of the Art Gallery of Nova Scotia, the New Brunswick Museum, the Beaverbrook Art Gallery, and the Canadian government's Department of Foreign Affairs, Trade and Development.
