= Strathbutler Award =

- Awarded for: visual arts in New Brunswick
- Sponsored by: The Sheila Hugh Mackay Foundation
- Country: Canada
- Reward: $25,000
- First award: 1991
- Website: sheilahughmackay.ca/awards/strathbutler-award/

The Strathbutler Award is a biennial prize awarded to a New Brunswick visual artist. It was first awarded in 1991 as an annual prize of $10,000, which increased to $15,000 in 2005. In 2011 it became a biennial award with a value of $25,000, the highest for any visual art prize in New Brunswick.

The Strathbutler is awarded by the Sheila Hugh Mackay Foundation, which was founded in 1987 by the New Brunswick philanthropist in order to promote the visual arts and fine crafts. A native of Saint John, Mackay lived from the mid 1980s in a cottage on her family's Rothesay estate, which was called Strathnaver. The cottage having been previously occupied by a man named Butler, she called her house Strathbutler, and later gave the name to her foundation's first art prize.

The Strathbutler Award recipients are chosen by jury. Once informed of the jury's choice, Mackay personally called the winners to congratulate them, and presented them with their awards, accompanied by a poem of her own composition, at a gala. Mackay died in 2004.

Since 2015 award recipients have received an "iconic presentation piece" in the form of a sterling silver and copper knife designed by 2006 Strathbutler laureate Brigitte Clavette. The design is based on the Mackay family crest and named Manu forti (with a strong hand), after the family's motto.

== Recipients ==
- 1991: John Hooper
- 1992: Tom Smith
- 1993: Peter Powning
- 1994: Kathy Hooper
- 1995: Nel Oudemans
- 1996: fr:Marie Hélène Allain
- 1997: Freeman Patterson
- 1998: fr:Roméo Savoie
- 1999: Suzanne Hill
- 2000: Rick Burns
- 2001: Gerard Collins
- 2002: Gordon Dunphy
- 2003: Thaddeus Holownia
- 2004: Janice Wright Cheney
- 2005: André Lapointe
- 2006: Brigitte Clavette
- 2007: Dan Steeves
- 2008: Anna Torma
- 2009: David Umholtz
- 2010: Linda Rae Dornan
- 2011: Herzl Kashetsky
- 2013: Susan Vida Judah
- 2015: Paul Mathieson
- 2017: Herménégilde Chiasson
- 2019: Bruce Gray
- 2021: Mathieu Léger
- 2023: John Murchie
- 2025: Judy Blake
