= Greg Payce =

Canadian sculptor (born 1956)

- Born: Gregory Payce; 1956 (age 69–70); Edmonton, Alberta, Canada
- Years active: 1990's–present
- Awards: Governor General’s Awards; Saidye Bronfman Award

Gregory Payce (born 1956) is a Canadian sculptor and teacher.

== Biography ==
Payce was born in Edmonton, Alberta. He graduated from the University of Alberta in 1977 with a Bachelor of Fine Arts. Payce later went to Halifax and studied at the Nova Scotia College of Art and Design, graduating with a Master of Fine Arts in 1987. In 1988, he began teaching at the Alberta University of the Arts in Calgary. He later retired in 2015.

Sometime in the mid 1990's, he began sculpting, and made his first sculpture, titled Wake, created in 1997. Payce's exhibition, Greg Payce: Illusions, was held at the Gardiner Museum in Toronto. He was awarded the Governor General’s Award for Media and Visual Arts and the Saidye Bronfman Award for Fine Craft in 2013.
