= Ann Suzuki =

Canadian artist

- Born: September 25, 1934; Ontario, Canada
- Died: January 26, 2021 (aged 86)

Ann Suzuki (September 25, 1934 – January 26, 2021) was a Canadian textile artist, craftsperson, and educator based in Northern Ontario.

== Early life and education ==
Suzuki was born in Ontario, the first of six children born to her parents. She began training in painting at 11 years old.

== Career ==
Although initially trained in painting, Suzuki realized in her late 20s that she wouldn't be able to support herself as a painter. She pivoted to textile art, specifically batik work on silk, which she continued to work on for the remainder of her life.

Throughout her career, Ann Suzuki focused on textile design, creating silk clothing pieces using the batik technique, a process for fabric dying. Suzuki specifically made batik tulis pieces which are done completely by hand. Suzuki's process of applying wax designs to silk required a great amount of labour and expertise. Her designs have been recognized across the world. She created pieces for notable personalities such as renowned pianist Liberace, and politician Flora MacDonald. Her piece for Liberace was an especially large project, involving 10 yards of dyed fabric.

Suzuki had her first exhibition in 1963, at the Canadian Guild of Crafts Gallery in Toronto.

In addition to her work, Suzuki was known for supporting the art scene in her community. She supported a fellow artist, Muiriel Macleod in creating Artists on Elgin, a gallery in Sudbury. She was the executive director of the Sudbury Crafts and Arts Foundation from 1997 until 2003. She also served as the Continuity Director of the Art Gallery of Sudbury from 1997 until 2020. Suzuki was a passionate organiser of the Wabi Sabi Fine Craft Exhibition and Sale, which takes place on St. Joseph Island in Ontario.

She is remembered as a passionate supporter of the arts.

== Awards and recognition ==
In 1983, Suzuki won an award from the Ontario Crafts Council Exhibition for Best Original Design in Batik.

In 1998, Suzuki received Craft Ontario's Mather Award.

In 2015, Suzuki received an award of exceptional achievement at the Mayor's Celebration of the Arts in Sudbury.

== Personal life ==
Suzuki moved to Sudbury, Ontario in 1982 with her partner, museum designer Taizo Miake. Suzuki had five children, four of whom survived her. She was a "proud" Japanese-Canadian.
