= Centennial Building (Fredericton) =

Office building on Fredericton, NB

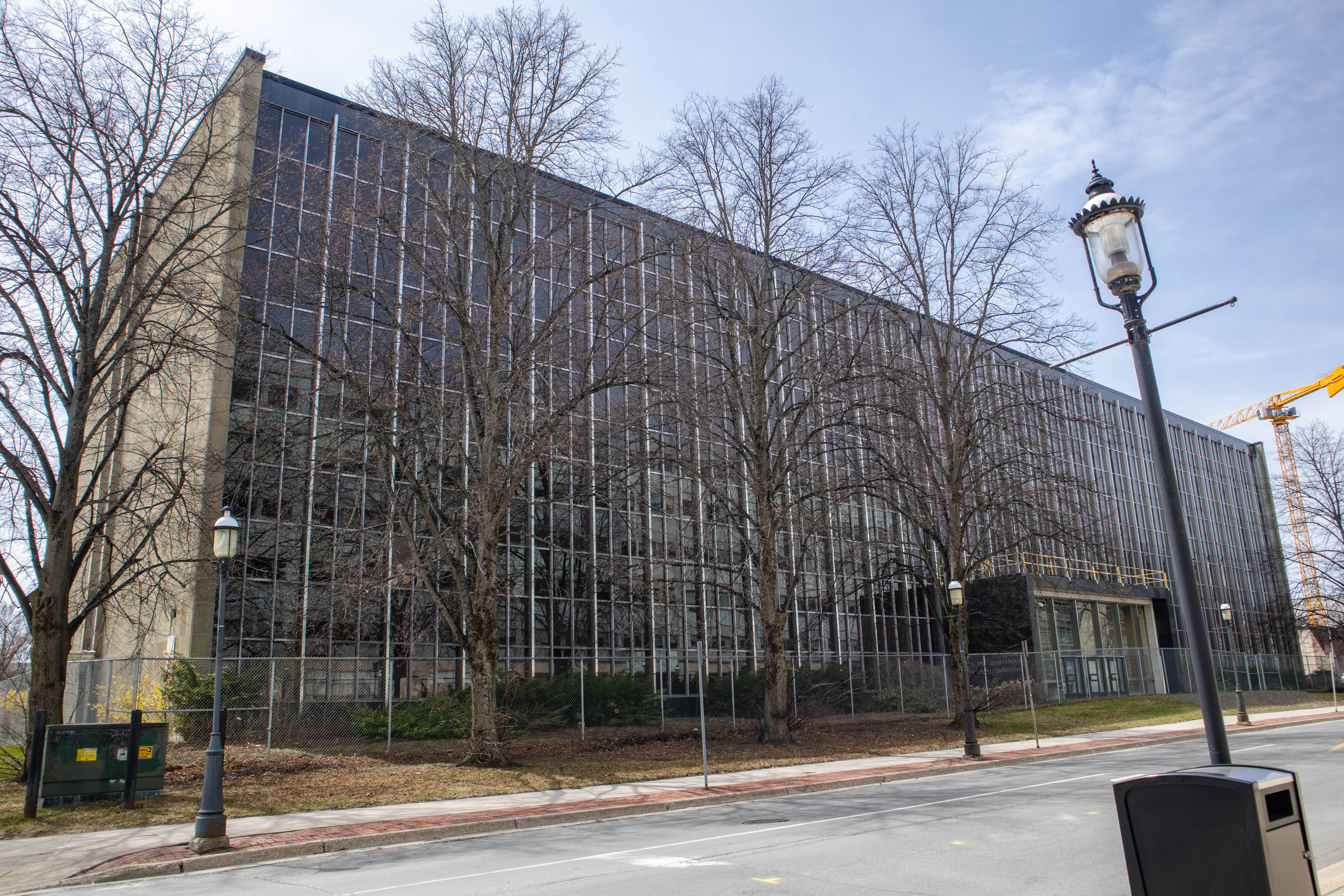
- Interactive map of the Centennial Building area
- Alternative names: L'édifice du Centenaire

General information
- Type: Office building
- Architectural style: International Style
- Location: 670 King St., Fredericton, New Brunswick, Canada
- Coordinates: 45.95928833402959°N 66.63822172712995°W
- Construction started: 1964
- Completed: 1967
- Inaugurated: 14 March 1967
- Cost: $7,000,000
- Client: New Brunswick provincial government
- Owner: Centennial Heritage Properties Inc.

Technical details
- Structural system: Structural steel frame clad in granite and sandstone with a glass curtain wall
- Floor count: 6
- Floor area: 250,000 sq ft (23,000 m^{2})

Design and construction
- Architect: Cyrille Roy
- Architecture firm: Bélanger & Roy (Moncton)
- Main contractor: Modern Construction Ltd. (Moncton)

The Centennial Building is an office building in downtown Fredericton, New Brunswick. Opened in March 1967, it was the province of New Brunswick's official Centennial project. At six storeys and 250,000 square feet (23,000 m^{2}), it was designed to accommodate over 1000 provincial civil servants, who had been dispersed in more than 20 separate buildings in Fredericton, the province's capital city.

In 2019 a project that would have replaced one wing of the building with a new courthouse and renovated the remaining structure was cancelled after a change in provincial government. The building was then sold to a company that planned to convert it for combined hotel and residential use.

The building incorporated commissioned murals by six New Brunswick artists: Jack Humphrey, Bruno Bobak, Claude Roussel, Fred Ross, Tom Forrestall and John Hooper. One mural was lost in the 1990s during a renovation, while two were removed and stored. The remaining three works, including Hooper's 45-foot-long (14 m) mural in the main lobby, remained in the building when it was sold.

== Planning, construction and design ==
In May 1962 the province of New Brunswick hired the Moncton architectural firm Bélanger & Roy to design an office building to house the province's civil service. In April 1964 the proposed building became the province's official Centennial project, which gave the province access to federal government funding of $2,500,000. The total cost of the building was approximately $7,000,000. A number of historic houses were demolished to make way for construction of the building, which occupies half a city block in downtown Fredericton. Premier Louis Robichaud laid the cornerstone in March 1965 and the building had its official opening in March 1967, with the Canadian Secretary of State Judy LaMarsh in attendance. It was the first jointly funded Centennial project to be completed. It accommodated over 1000 civil servants who had previously been dispersed in more than 25 buildings.

The building, which is built in a T-shape, has 250,000 square feet (23,000 m^{2}) of floor space over six storeys. It is in the International Style with a structural steel framework and a stainless steel and reflective glass curtain wall. The exterior cladding incorporates black granite from New Brunswick and olive sandstone from Nova Scotia. The building contained, in addition to office space with movable partitions, meeting rooms, a mainframe computer centre, a cafeteria, and a post office.

The main lobby has polished travertine columns and walls, terrazzo flooring, and a high ceiling of translucent backlit panels. Historic texts in brass lettering on the lobby walls include poems by New Brunswick poets Bliss Carman and Sir Charles G. D. Roberts, extracts from the diaries of Samuel de Champlain, and a transcription of the Lord's Prayer in the Miꞌkmaq language.

The provincial government commissioned murals for the building from six New Brunswick artists. John Hooper's design depicting scenes from New Brunswick's history was chosen first for the lobby. The sculpture is 45 feet (14 m) long and made of resin and fiberglass. Only one mural had been intended but the commissioning committee went on to invite five more artists to create works, one for each of the upper floors. Each piece represented an aspect of New Brunswick culture or industry. The second floor had a welded metal sculpture by Claude Roussel representing forestry. On the third floor three miners were depicted by Bruno Bobak in relief on plywood. On the fourth floor was Jack Humphrey's glass mosaic tile mural of coastal fishermen. Farming was represented on the fifth floor by a sheet metal construction by Tom Forrestall, and a painting by Fred Ross on the sixth floor reflected the province's literary heritage.

== Centennial year to the end of the 20th century ==
The official 100th anniversary Dominion Day ceremony on July 1, 1967, took place on the steps of the Centennial Building and the annual conference of provincial premiers was held in the building in August 1967.

By March 1969, a bomb scare caused "about 2,000 employees", as well as the premier and his cabinet, to be evacuated from the Centennial Building.

In the early years public guided tours of the Centennial Building were offered, with particular attention paid to the six murals. In the early 1990s the Fred Ross mural on the sixth floor was removed during a renovation and was apparently lost.

The building remained open and accessible to the public until after the September 11 attacks in 2001. Following that event a security desk was installed in the lobby and members of the public were not able to enter the rest of the building.

== The Centennial building in the 21st century ==
Other than the addition of security measures after September 2001, the Centennial Building had not undergone any significant internal renovations. Its imposing lobby was used in the 2006 miniseries Canada Russia '72 as a filming location for the Moscow airport.

In the early 2000s the government considered nominating the building as a provincial heritage site but did not proceed with this idea. In 2007 the provincial government "made a commitment to maintaining the building and renovating it where required". An architect was hired to examine the building and report to the provincial Department of Supply and Services, describing its condition and making recommendations for its future. In 2013 the government began moving employees from the Centennial Building into a new office building nearby.

In January 2017 the province's Liberal government announced plans for a $76,000,000 project to renovate two of the building's three wings and demolish the third in order to build a new courthouse which would have been attached to the original structure. The intention was to return some government departments from rented offices back to the Centennial Building, saving an estimated $2,500,000 annually. Work on the project started in 2018, beginning with the demolition of the building's third wing. In December 2018 the newly elected Progressive Conservative government cancelled the project. $13,000,000 had already been spent on the work and the government was liable for $11,000,000 in short-term cancellation costs. The Minister of Transportation and Infrastructure said that the cancellation of this and several other projects was necessary in order to reduce the provincial debt and protect the province's credit rating from being downgraded by bond rating agencies. In May 2019 the government issued a request for proposal for private sector purchase of the Centennial Building, specifying "no inclusion of public money or risk to provincial taxpayers".

In late 2019 the Centennial Building was sold for $4,000,000 to Centennial Heritage Properties, which proposed to refurbish it as a hotel and residential property, adding a penthouse level, balconies, and new windows in the sandstone sides. In December 2020 Fredericton's city council approved zoning changes to allow this use. Geoff Colter, the private developer who owns the building, made a proposal to the city requesting permission to make major transformations to the building's façade. The proposal was largely criticized by the general public, with some critics arguing that the proposed changes would ruin its historic character. In January 2025, a city planning committee composed of citizens and councilors rejected the proposal.

=== The murals ===
The murals by Hooper, Bobak, and Humphrey were still in place when the building was sold. Plywood boxes had been built around them to protect them during the renovation. The murals by Roussel and Forrestall had been removed and stored by the New Brunswick Art Bank. The Art Bank, which falls under the Department of Tourism, owns the Centennial Building murals. The Department intends to return the murals to the building, stating that they "will be protected and conserved and will remain a lasting and important element", while accessible only to residents or hotel guests.
