= Herzl Kashetsky =

Canadian artist (born 1950)

- Born: Herzl Jacob Kashetsky; 13 February 1950 (age 76); Saint John, New Brunswick, Canada
- Education: B.F.A., Concordia University, Montreal, Quebec (1972)
- Awards: Honorary Doctorate from the University of New Brunswick (1992); Commemorative Medal for outstanding artistic contribution to the community for Canada's 125th anniversary of Confederation (1992); the New Brunswick Red Cross Humanitarian Award, and a best picture award at the 53rd annual exhibition of the Canadian Society of Painters in Water Colour (both 1997); the Strathbutler Award for Excellence in Visual Arts from the Sheila Hugh Mackay Foundation (2011)

Herzl Kashetsky LL. D. (born 1950) is a realist painter, known for his commemorative work in paintings dedicated to victims of the Holocaust. The main body of his art has been figurative, and embedded in the representational.

== Career ==
Born in 1950 in Saint John, New Brunswick, Kashetsky was inspired to draw and paint as a child, and encouraged by his artist older brother, Joseph (1941–1974). He received his B.F.A. from Concordia University, Montréal, Québec (1972), then had his first professional show, with Joseph, in 1972 at the University of New Brunswick Art Centre in Fredericton NB. In 1977, he undertook independent study in Rome and Florence.

In the late 1970s, he painted still-life subjects with a subtle commentary, as in his painting Innocence (1977, Robert McLaughlin Gallery, Oshawa), reproduced in Joan Murray's book Confessions of a Curator (1996). In the 1980s, he was drawn to scenes of Saint John like a door in the city market or views of the city, but by 1989, he was exploring the theme of Creation, about the seven days of Creation. In 1991, the Art Gallery of Hamilton held a significant show of his still life watercolour paintings which recalled the 'vanitas' tradition, Herzl Kashetsky: Civilization and the Beast. Beginning in 1992, he created the series Beach Stones, shown at the Beaverbrook Art Gallery in 1992, which he is still working on to the present day. This series is considered to be some of his most meticulous work.

After a trip in the early 1990s to Poland and visits to holocaust sites, he was inspired to create his elegiac 1996 series, A Prayer for the Dead which was shown in a circulating exhibition by the Beaverbrook Art Gallery in 1997, curated by Tom Smart, who described it in the catalogue as a visual prayer. A Prayer for the Dead, for which he used documentary photographs as a source, was not only Kashetsky's way of paying respect to the dead, but his way of commemorating the tragedy of the death of six million people in the concentration camps. Kashetsky once wrote in a sketchbook about his work:

I want to draw or paint something that is worth looking at more than once. I want it to be connected to something meaningful.

In 2011, the Beaverbrook Art Gallery held Glitter and Gloom: the sketchbooks of Herzl Kashetsky, curated by Terry Graff. In 2012, Herzl Kashetsky – A Thousand Words are Worth a Picture was shown at the Saint John Arts Centre in which a multitude of words composed ink drawings. In 2022, Gallery 78 in Fredericton, New Brunswick held a show titled 50th Anniversary Exhibition – Joseph & Herzl Kashetsky to celebrate the two brothers first professional show at the University of New Brunswick Art Centre in 1972.

Kashetsky is represented in the following public collections, among others: The Royal Collection, Windsor Castle; the Beaverbrook Art Gallery, Fredericton; the University of New Brunswick Art Centre; the Robert McLaughlin Gallery, Oshawa, the New Brunswick Museum, Saint John; and the Confederation Centre Art Gallery, Charlottetown.

== Commissions ==
Kashetsky has received numerous commissions for portraits such as his painting of The Lieutenant Governor of New Brunswick (NB) (1997), his Chancellor of Acadia University, Wolfville, Nova Scotia (2016), and his vice-president, University of New Brunswick, Saint John NB (2018) as well as his Fundy Beach Stones Triptych for Irving Oil Ltd. Saint John NB (7.5x15 ft) (2019).

In 1986, he was the subject of a CBC documentary, Portraits of the Maritimes: Herzl Kashetsky. From 2013 to 2014, he served on the jury for the National Holocaust Monument Ottawa (opened 2017).

== Honours ==
- Honorary doctorate from the University of New Brunswick (1992);
- Commemorative medal for outstanding artistic contribution to the community, for Canada's 125th anniversary of Confederation (1992);
- New Brunswick Red Cross Humanitarian Award (1997);
- Best picture award at the 53rd annual exhibition of the Canadian Society of Painters in Water Colour (1997);
- Strathbutler Award for Excellence in Visual Arts from the Sheila Hugh Mackay Foundation (2011)
- Queen's Diamond Jubilee Medal (2012)
