= Harry Thurston =

Canadian writer (born 1950)

- Born: 1950 (age 75–76); Yarmouth, Nova Scotia, Canada
- Occupations: Writer; journalist

Harry Thurston (born 1950) is a Canadian writer, poet, and journalist. He has written a variety of nonfiction books, for which he won the Evelyn Richardson Award four times, and is also an accomplished poet. He teaches at the University of King's College in Halifax.

== Biography ==
Harry Thurston was born in 1950 in Yarmouth, Nova Scotia. He attended Acadia University, graduating in 1971 with a Bachelor of Science in Biology. As a journalist, Thurston has written for over 30 publications, including National Geographic, Audubon, and Harrowsmith. He has written a variety of nonfiction books, for which he won the Evelyn Richardson Award four times: in 1991, 1997, 2004, and 2012. His book Tidal Life also earned a Dartmouth Book Award and an Atlantic Booksellers' Choice Award. He won the first Lane Anderson Award in 2012 for his book The Atlantic Coast: A Natural History. Thurston is also an accomplished poet, with his first collection, Barefaced Stone, published in 1980 by Fiddlehead Poetry Books.

Thurston was the publisher and editor of Germination, a literary journal. He was a contributing editor for the magazine Equinox since it was established in 1981.

Thurston lives in Tidnish Bridge, Nova Scotia. He works as an instructor at the University of King's College in Halifax, and previously taught poetry at Saint Mary's University. Thurston has served as writer-in-residence for Mount Allison University, Dalhousie University, and Acadia University.

== Publications ==
=== Nonfiction ===
- — (1989). Exploring Change: People and Places (Textbook). Vancouver: Douglas & McIntyre. ISBN 978-0-9208-4194-5.
- — (1990). Atlantic Outposts. Lawrencetown Beach, N.S.: Pottersfield Press. ISBN 978-0-9190-0163-3.
- — (1990). Tidal Life: A Natural History of the Bay of Fundy. Halifax, N.S.: Nimbus Publishing. ISBN 1-5510-9272-7.
- — (1993). Against Darkness and Storm: Lighthouses of Atlantic Canada. Halifax, N.S.: Nimbus Publishing. ISBN 978-1-5510-9039-9.
- — (1994). Dawning of the Dinosaurs: The Story of Canada's Oldest Dinosaurs. Halifax, N.S.: Nimbus Publishing. ISBN 978-1-5510-9100-6.
- — (1996). World of the Shorebirds. San Francisco: Sierra Club Books. ISBN 978-0-8715-6901-1.
- — (1996). The Nature of Shorebirds: Nomads of the Wetlands. Vancouver: Greystone Books. ISBN 978-1-5505-4502-9.
- — (1998). Building the Bridge to P.E.I. Halifax, N.S.: Nimbus Publishing. ISBN 978-1-5510-9260-7.
- — (1998). The Atlantic Canada Nature Guide. Toronto: Key Porter Books. ISBN 978-1-5501-3952-5.
- — (1999). World of the Hummingbird. San Francisco: Sierra Club Books. ISBN 978-1-5780-5043-7.
- — (2002). The Sea Among the Rocks: Travels in Atlantic Canada. Lawrencetown Beach, N.S.: Pottersfield Press. ISBN 978-1-8959-0054-5.
- — (2003). Island of the Blessed: the Secrets of Egypt's Everlasting Oasis. Toronto: Anchor Canada. ISBN 978-0-3852-5970-5.
- — (2004). A Place Between the Tides: A Naturalist's Reflections on the Salt Marsh. Vancouver: Greystone Books. ISBN 978-1-5536-5035-5.
- — (2011). The Atlantic Coast: A Natural History. Vancouver: Greystone Books. ISBN 978-1-5536-5446-9.
- — (2020). Lost River: The Waters of Remembrance. Kentville, N.S.: Gaspereau Press. ISBN 978-1-5544-7216-1.

=== Poetry ===
- — (1980). Barefaced Stone. Fredericton, N.B.: Fiddlehead Poetry Books. ISBN 978-0-9201-1085-0.
- — (1985). Clouds Flying Before the Eye. Fredericton, N.B.: Fiddlehead Poetry Books. ISBN 978-0-8649-2062-1.
- — (2000). If Men Lived on Earth. Kentville, N.S.: Gaspereau Press. ISBN 978-1-8940-3122-6.
- — (2005). A Ship Portrait: A Novella in Verse. Kentville, N.S.: Gaspereau Press. ISBN 978-1-5544-7006-8.
- — (2005). The Sea's Voice. Halifax, N.S.: Nimbus Publishing. ISBN 978-1-5510-9547-9.
- — (2007). Broken Vessel: Thirty-five Days in the Desert. Kentville, N.S.: Gaspereau Press. ISBN 978-1-5544-7034-1.
- — (2010). Animals of My Own Kind: New and Selected Poems. Montreal: Signal Editions. ISBN 978-1-5506-5258-1.
- — (2011). Ova Aves. Photography by Thaddeus Holownia. Jolicure, N.B.: Anchorage Press. ISBN 978-1-8954-8845-6.
- —; Cooper, Allan (2013). The Deer Yard. Kentville, N.S.: Gaspereau Press. ISBN 978-1-5544-7120-1.
- — (2015). Keeping Watch at the End of the World. Kentville, N.S.: Gaspereau Press. ISBN 978-1-5544-7144-7.
- — (2022). Icarus, Falling of Birds. Photography by Thaddeus Holownia. Jolicure, N.B.: Anchorage Press. ISBN 978-1-8954-8854-8.
- — (2023). Ultramarine. Kentville, N.S.: Gaspereau Press. ISBN 978-1-5544-7253-6.
- — (2024). of a feather. Photography by Thaddeus Holownia. Jolicure, N.B.: Anchorage Press. ISBN 978-1-8954-8862-3.
