= Craft Ontario =

Nonprofit organization

Former logo of the Ontario Crafts Council, designed by Debbie Adams of Adams + Associates Design Consultants. Knot symbol designed by Burton Kramer.

Craft Ontario, legally known as the Ontario Crafts Council (OCC), is a member-based, not-for-profit arts service organization based in Toronto, Ontario, Canada. The organization is dedicated to promoting the recognition and appreciation of craft and craftspeople in Ontario and beyond.

== History ==
The OCC was founded in 1976 through the merger of the Canadian Guild of Crafts Ontario, established in 1931, and the Ontario Craft Foundation, established in 1966.

In 2014, the OCC rebranded itself as Craft Ontario, simultaneously renaming the OCC Gallery as the Craft Ontario Gallery and the Guild Shop as the Craft Ontario Shop. However, the organization remains legally known as the Ontario Crafts Council.

=== Progenitor Organizations ===
==== The Canadian Handicrafts Guild (The Canadian Guild of Crafts Ontario) ====
The Canadian Handicrafts Guild originated at the turn of the twentieth century in Montreal as a result of the dual efforts of Alice Peck (née Skelton) and Mary (May) Phillips. In the same spirit as the Arts and Crafts Movement spearheaded by the English artist and designer William Morris, these likeminded women shared an appreciation for handmade work that was becoming increasingly rare as industrialization brought machine-made materials and objects to the market. Motivated by a desire to arouse waning public interest in handcrafted objects, the group organized two exhibitions of craft. The first of these exhibitions was held in 1900 in Métis, Quebec. The second was in Montréal at Henry Morgan's department store. In 1905, the group was chartered as The Canadian Handicrafts Guild; in 1906, it was incorporated nationally.

The Canadian Handicrafts Guild is a significant organization in Canadian history whose impact extended well beyond the promotion of arts and culture. During the Depression, the Guild opened a weaving school in Montréal to train instructors to teach weaving to farmers in Manitoba and Alberta. Crop failures in these provinces left land workers with no money to purchase clothing. The instruction program initiated by the Guild enabled workers in Manitoba and Alberta to weave their own fabric for clothing.

In 1931, a group of Toronto individuals interested in crafts joined to form the Handicrafts Association of Canada. Adelaide Marriott, who had been involved with The Canadian Handicrafts Guild, informed this new group of the existence of The Canadian Handicrafts Guild. The existence of another national craft organization having been brought to their attention, the Toronto group changed their name to the Ontario Branch of the Canadian Handicrafts Guild. In 1967, the Canadian Handicrafts Guild changed their name to Canadian Guild of Crafts, and it was, ultimately, the Canadian Guild of Crafts Ontario that amalgamated with the Ontario Craft Foundation to form the OCC.

==== Ontario Craft Foundation ====
The Ontario Craft Foundation was established in June 1966 following a series of recommendations developed at two provincial conferences. It was recommended that an organization be established whose primary aim would be to promote the development of craft in Ontario. Thus, the Ontario Craft Foundation was formed. One of the key achievements in the history of the Ontario Craft Foundation is the establishment of Sheridan College School of Design. The Foundation was also set apart by its mandate to serve craftspeople throughout the entire province of Ontario since its funding was largely drawn from taxpayer dollars.

=== The Formation of the OCC ===
The OCC was formed when, in the 1970s, it was evident that there was confusion surrounding the mandates of the two independent provincial craft organizations and overlap of their programming and services. From 1973 to 1975, a series of meetings were held to discuss a merger between the Canadian Guild of Crafts and the Ontario Craft Foundation. A new board was formed of twelve board members from each founding organization. In October 1975, the first meeting of the Interim Board of Directors of the Ontario Crafts Council was held, though the organization was not patented until August 1976. The founding president of the board was Toronto philanthropist Joan Chalmers.

== The Craft Ontario Gallery ==
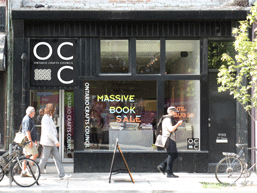
An exterior view taken in 2010 of the OCC Gallery and administrative offices, located at 990 Queen Street West in Toronto, Ontario, Canada.

The Craft Ontario Gallery (previously known as the Craft Gallery or the OCC Gallery) opened in 1976 when the exhibition committees of the Canadian Guild of Crafts Ontario and the Ontario Craft Foundation merged. Historically, The Craft Gallery has been housed in the same building as the council's administrative offices, and this is still true today.

The Craft Ontario Gallery is unique in that many of its exhibitions are framed within a critical context that is relatively uncommon when presenting works of craft. For instance, The Craft Ontario Gallery's 2009 exhibition DIwhy, for which the council partnered with Toronto Craft Alert to organize, examined the social and political origins of the DIY movement and the ways in which its aesthetic and driving philosophy have infiltrated wider craft and art making practices.

In addition to establishing a strong curatorial focus for its exhibitions, of utmost importance to the OCC is that its yearly programming reflects the diversity of its members. OCC members may apply for exhibitions at the Craft Ontario Gallery, and they are encouraged to submit their work to OCC juried shows.

== Studio Magazine ==
Studio: Craft and Design in Canada is the OCC's biannually published magazine. It is the descendant of a number of past OCC publications – specifically, of Craftsman, which ran from 1976 to 1980 and was reborn as Ontario Craft in 1981. In 2006, the OCC launched Studio, revamping the publication's focus and design, and since then has partnered with the Crafts Association of British Columbia, Alberta Craft Council, the Saskatchewan Craft Council, and the Craft Council of Newfoundland & Labrador to make the magazine a nationally distributed publication.

== Awards and scholarships ==
The OCC has an awards and scholarships program through which it distributes approximately thirty awards annually. Awards are given out to both emerging and established makers.

The present-day awards the OCC offers have their origin in the awards established by the women's committee of The Canadian Handicrafts Guild. The women's committee recognized a need for scholarships that would enable makers to further their studies in the field. Lacking funds to initiate such an endeavour, the women's committee arranged an exhibition of a portion of the Salvadore Dali collection of "Art in Jewels," owned by the Cheatham Foundation of New York. The exhibition was on display at the Royal Ontario Museum and successfully raised $4,760 for the scholarship fund. In fact, the exhibition drew in the largest number of visitors for a single exhibition at the Royal Ontario Museum to date.

The Mather medal; designed by Jim Wies

=== Mather Award for Lifetime Achievement ===
Since 1981, the OCC has recognized individuals for outstanding contribution to crafts over an extended period with a Mather Award. The namesake of the award, John Mather, was president and managing director of Indusmin Limited. Through the company's association with glass and ceramic production, Mather became a firm supporter of craft, serving as President of the Ontario Crafts Foundation in 1972 and the founding treasurer of the OCC. After Mather's death in a plane crash in 1977, the OCC honoured Mather through the establishment of the John Mather Award, which is administered by the executive committee of the OCC. Originally awarded to three individuals annually, the award is now given to one individual each year, a change that has increased the already high level of prestige associated with the award.

The Mather Award medal was designed by Jim Wies. A hand and the OCC logo decorate one side of the medal, which is cast in bronze in high relief. The reverse side of the medal has the inscription: "The Ontario Crafts Council awards this medal in appreciation of your contribution to craft in Ontario." The Mather family commissions the casting of the medals as well as the presentation piece for the medal, designed by Toronto-based artist and woodworker Joel Robson. In the past, this presentation piece was designed by Michael Fortune.

==== Past Recipients of the Mather Award ====
- 2021: Jayne Nevins
- 2020: Dr. Denis Longchamps
- 2019: Volunteer Committee (over 40 years)
- 2018: Rosalyn Morrison
- 2017: Laura Donefer
- 2016: Michael Fortune
- 2015: Beth Alber
- 2014: Lois Etherington Betteridge
- 2013: M. Joan Chalmers C.C O.Ont.
- 2011: Andrew Goss and Sandra Noble Goss
- 2010: Lily Yung
- 2009: David Kaye, Lillian Forrester, Jonathon Bancroft-Snell
- 2008: Anne Chambers, Peter Fleming, Carolynn Pynn-Trudeau
- 2007: Melanie Egan, Alice Fournier, Kent Farndale
- 2006: Herbert O. Bunt, Gilles Latour, Rosemary Swan
- 2005: Judy Donaldson, Ruth Haig, Brian Truscott
- 2004: Bruce Cochrane, Pat James, Robert Têtu
- 2003: Keith Campbell, Doug Farndale, Ann Roberts
- 2002: Aggie Beynon, Winifred Shantz, Harold Takayesu
- 2001: Paulus Tjang, Melinda Mayhall, Susan Jefferies
- 2000: Jan Waldorf, Donn Zver, Jonathan E. Smith
- 1999: Anne Sneath, Gail Crawford, Peta Hall
- 1998: William Hodge, Judith Tinkl, Ann Suzuki
- 1997: Joan Francis, Edith Pierce, Mary Walker
- 1996: Eric Poschman, Bill Corcoran, David McAleese & Alison Wiggins
- 1995: Scott Barnim, Anne Barros, Alison Vallance
- 1994: Heather Daymond, Wendy Shingler, Adrienne Van Riemsdijk
- 1993: Ron Roy, Shelagh Smith, Frank Tucker
- 1992: Barb Bolin, Mary Corcoran, David Wilde
- 1991: Susan Eckenwalder, Elizabeth Kantor, Ruth Markowitz
- 1990: Eunice Anders, Suzann Greenaway, Steve Irvine
- 1989: Robert Jekyll, Ted Carson, Leta Cormier
- 1988: Paula Letki, C. Kennedy May, Alice Peck Slavin
- 1987: Ankaret Dean, Joan Foster, Ann Mortimer
- 1986: Barbara Mather, Donald A. Stuart, Vincent Tovell, Susan Willoughby
- 1985: Dorthy Burnham C.M., Stephen Hogbin, Walter Sunahara
- 1984: Jean Johnson, Richard LaPrairie, Karen Smith
- 1983: Jean Burke, Elizabeth Dingman, Mary Eileen Hogg C.M.
- 1982: Helen Francis Gregor C.M., Dr. Franc Joubom, Yvonne Williams
- 1981: Tommia Vaughan-Jones, Hero Kielman, Donald McKinley

== The Craft Ontario Shop ==
The Guild Shop, located in Toronto's Yorkville district.

The Craft Ontario Shop (previously known as the Guild Shop) in Toronto's Yorkville district is the OCC's retail location. Since the OCC's origins as The Canadian Handicrafts Guild Ontario, retail sales have been an integral component of the OCC. Members of the OCC may submit their work for consideration to be sold at The Guild Shop, the proceeds of which support the livelihood of individual makers, as well as help support general OCC programming. The Guild Shop represents approximately 400 craftspeople from across Canada.

The Craft Ontario Shop is known in Toronto as one of the premier locations in the city for purchasing one-of-a-kind, handmade objects. Throughout its existence, a number of well-known celebrities and political figures have shopped at The Guild Shop, including Bill Clinton, Margaret Atwood, Jeanne Beker, Christopher Plummer, Beau Bridges, Robin Williams, Whoopi Goldberg and Rachel McAdams.

=== Branches ===
As with the OCC offices and gallery, the Craft Ontario Shop has also experienced a number of incarnations throughout its existence. In its beginnings, The Canadian Guild of Crafts Ontario had work available for purchase at its locations on Cumberland Street, Bloor Street, and, at their very outset, in Eaton's department store. At times, The Guild Shop had secondary outlets at various locations throughout Toronto and the wider province, including in Stratford, Ontario, from 1965 to 1969. An outlet was also open at Trillium Terminal 3 at Pearson International Airport in 1991; however, this location proved unprofitable and was closed after 10 months. At one point, The Guild Shop also had work available for purchase in the CN Tower gift shop. The Guild Shop has been located at its present location of 118 Cumberland since 1995.

== Membership Benefits ==
As a member-based organization, the OCC offers many benefits and services to its members. As a member of the OCC, craftspeople are eligible to apply for OCC awards and scholarships as well as OCC-sponsored juried exhibitions. Members also receive discounted rates on OCC workshops, seminars, and conferences as well as complimentary admission to various galleries throughout Ontario. In addition to these discounts, members pay a reduced rate to advertise in OCC publications and on purchases at The Guild Shop. Members also receive regular communication and invitations from the OCC, including two issues of Studio: Craft and Design in Canada.

Of the services the OCC provides to members, among the greatest impact on craftspeople are the group health and dental programs; the discount rates on business, home, and auto insurance; as well as the merchant discount rates on Visa, MasterCard, and Interac that are available through the OCC.

== Portfolio of Makers ==
The OCC's Portfolio of Makers is an online database of craftspeople accessible through the OCC website from which the public may commission works of craft. The OCC launched Portfolio of Makers online in October 2001. Prior to this, a hardcopy version of the program was available at the now defunct Craft Resource Centre of the OCC. In addition to housing this first, hardcopy incarnation of Portfolio of Makers, The Craft Resource Centre was recognized as being "one of Canada's largest and most comprehensive libraries specializing in the craft field."

Portfolio of Makers is an affordable and simple way for OCC members to advertise their work online. As a result, the database has proven to be a popular resource for craftspeople as well as designers, craft collectors, corporations, and the general public.

Original logo of the Ontario Crafts Council designed by Burton Kramer

== Logo ==
The original OCC logo pictured at the top of this page was designed by Debbie Adams of Adams + Associates Design Consultants Incorporated based in Toronto, Ontario. The weaving symbol that has been incorporated in the bottom, left corner was designed by the well known graphic designer Burton Kramer, who also designed the iconic Canadian Broadcasting Corporation logo.

The new Craft Ontario logo, launched in 2014 and designed by SOS Design, is a dynamic logo intended to reflect the different materials used in craft.

== Notable Members ==
Numerous past and present OCC members have been awarded the Saidye Bronfman Award. The Saidye Bronfman Award is "Canada's foremost distinction for excellence in the fine crafts," and is one of the highest honours a craftsperson can receive. The chart below lists past or present OCC members who have received the award.

Kevin Lockau	2009	Michael C. Fortune	1993
Paul Mathieu	2007	Susan Warner-Keene	1991
Michael Hosaluk	2005	Dorothy Caldwell	1990
Kai Hung Chan	2002	Harlan House	1989
Léopold L. Foulem	2001	Lutz Haufschild	1988
Peter Fleming	2000	Carole Sabiston	1987
Susan Low-Beer	1999	Lois Etherington Betteridge	1978
Marcel Marois	1998	Robin Hopper	1977
William (Grit) Laskin	1997		
