= Carl Daniel Ekman =

Swedish chemical engineer

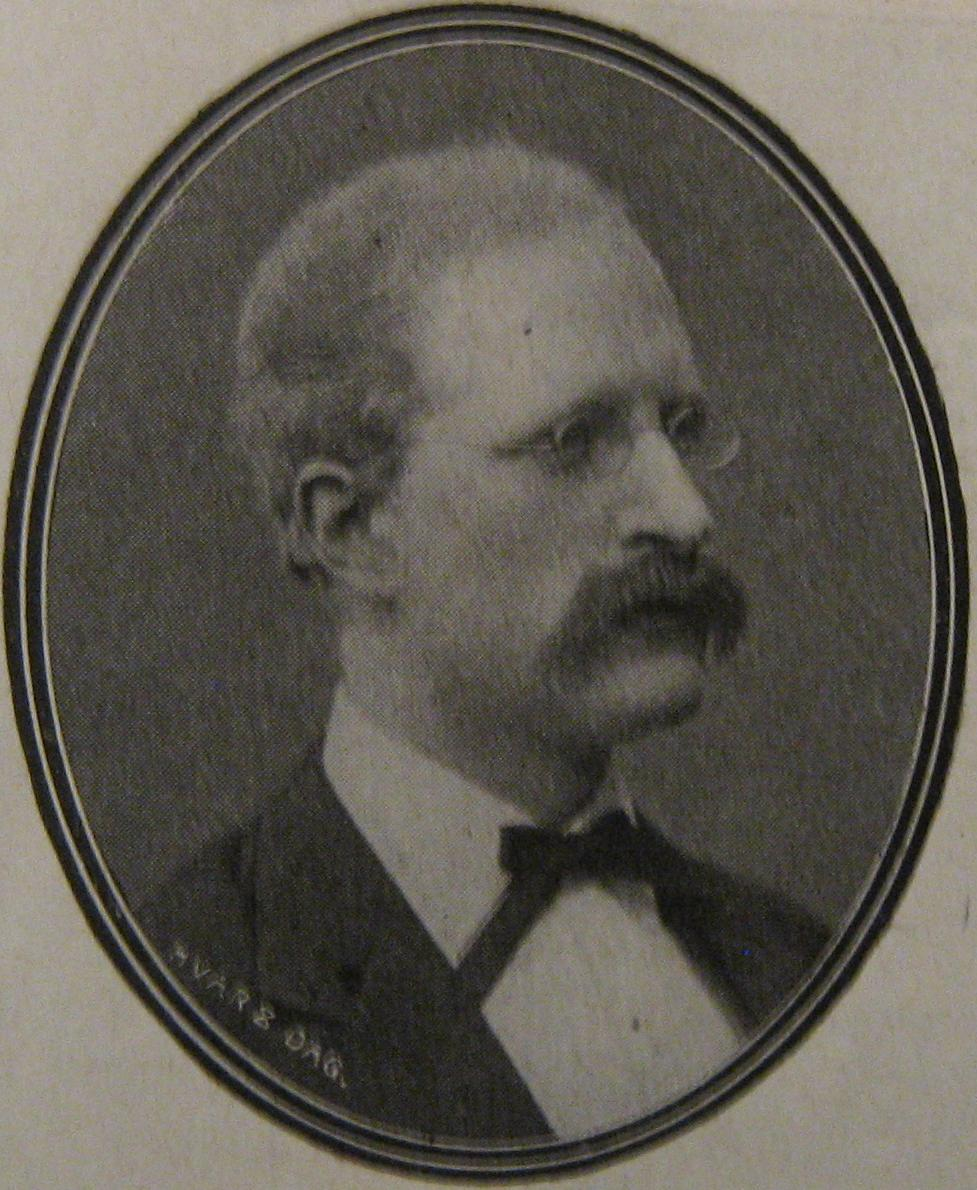
- Born: March 17, 1845; Kalmar, Sweden
- Died: November 3, 1904 (aged 59); Gravesend, England
- Education: Technological Institute (1868)
- Occupation: Chemical engineer
- Known for: Sulfite process

Carl Daniel Ekman (March 17, 1845 – November 3, 1904) was a Swedish chemical engineer who invented the form of the sulfite process of wood pulp manufacturing which was first established on a firm commercial basis, helping to replace rags as the main raw material of paper with wood pulp. The process was developed at Bergvik, Sweden, from 1871 to 1874, In 1879, he emigrated to England, and opened the Ekman Pulp and Paper Company mill in Northfleet, Kent near the mouth of the Thames River in 1886. He was also a consulting engineer and helped establish mills in Lachendorf, Celle, Germany, Dieppe, France, Rumford, Rhode Island, St. Petersburg, Russia, Corfu and Italy. After contracting malaria in French Guiana and losing a lawsuit on pollution of a Northfleet limestone quarry, he died bankrupt in Gravesend, Kent.

== Early life ==
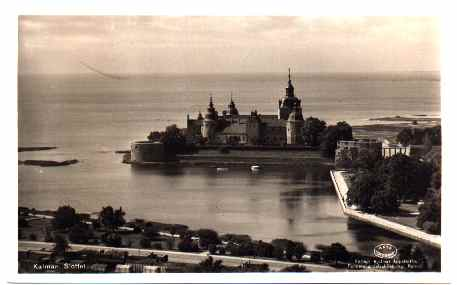
Kalmar Castle in the early 20th century.

Ekman was the sixteenth and final child born in a 28-year period to Otto Christian Ekman at his home at 36 Södra Långgatan in Kalmar, Sweden. Carl Daniel was the third child born to Otto Christian's second wife, Maria Louise Indebetou, formerly of Forshaga. Otto Christian was a medical doctor who served at Kalmar Castle. Otto's father had been a pewterer in Malmö.

In 1861 Carl Daniel finished school and began working in the Ugglan pharmacy in Stockholm. It is believed that he passed his pharmacist examination before starting his education as an engineer in 1865 at the Technological Institute in Stockholm. He graduated in June, 1868 with first class honors, then worked for two years for the wine processor Liljeholmens Vinfabriks Aktiebolag, on Svartmangatan, Stockholm.

== Career in paper manufacturing ==
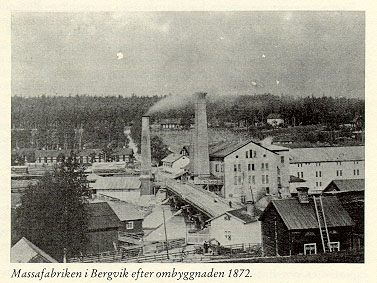
The Bergvik paper mill in 1872.

In August 1871 he was hired as a chemist for the Bergvik mill, where his half-brother Hugo was manager. The mill used the method of George Fry for processing wood pulp for paper. In 1872 Ekman developed a modified method: rather than simply bleaching a mechanically produced pulp, he cooked the pulp under pressure in a solution of bisulfite of magnesia. A new plant was built in 1874 in Bergvik that used this process.

A similar sulfite process had been invented by Benjamin Chew Tilghman in 1867 in Philadelphia, but he was unable to put it into commercial production. In Germany, Mitscherlich independently discovered a similar process about 1880.

Working with Fry, the new pulp was introduced quickly into paper production, perhaps first in Fry's Ilford plant, and then into a newly built mill at Northfleet in 1879. A second mill at Northfleet was completed in 1886 and owned by the Ekman Pulp and Paper Company, which was partially owned by Fry. This mill continued to operate until the 1970s. The Ekman process was also used in Godalming in the early 1880s. The process was kept as a commercial secret rather than patented, until a British patent was issued in 1881, and an American patent was issued in 1882. The American patent rights were represented by W.F. and F.C. Sayles. Ekman lived with the Sayles family in Pawtucket, Rhode Island while working on Charles W. Wheelwright's Richmond Paper Co. mill at Rumford starting in 1884.

Ekman traveled extensively helping to construct mills in France, Italy, Russia, and Germany, as well as searching for new raw material that might be used in paper making. He visited French Guiana where he contracted malaria, and in 1885 visited British Guiana. He experimented with sugar cane, straw, aspen, birch, sycamore, esparto grass, linen, and hemp to provide paper pulp.

In 1896 the Ekman Pulp and Paper Company, Limited issued 4½ First Mortgage Debentures of £100 Each and stated in the prospectus that

The Company was constituted in 1883. It possesses two Mills, one at Northfleet (freehold) with a complete plant for the manufacture of sulphite wood-pulp and four paper machines, and the other at Ilford (leasehold) with one paper machine. The out-put of these five machines is now 150 tons of paper per week

By 1900 the sulfite process had become the dominant method to manufacture paper, with this dominance lasting until about 1940 when the kraft process (sulfate process) became dominant.

== Later life ==
In 1889 Ekman married 17-year-old Rosina Noble, who was 26 years his junior. Rosina was born Lincoln, Lincolnshire, England 1871. They had three sons, Carl Mario, Oscar Umberto, and Francis Otto (Frank Bayne Sr.). The family lived in France, Italy and other part of Europe before settling in Northfleet and Gravesend where CD Ekman had his Northfleet Paper Mill.UK Census 1901

Ekman continued to suffer from malaria and also contracted typhoid fever about 1900. He was also sued for polluting a limestone quarry near the Northfleet mill. He died soon after losing the suit, and was buried in an unmarked grave in Northfleet. His children were educated from a special fund, collected by the British Wood Pulp Association. They all moved to Canada upon reaching majority, and Mario and Oscar served in Canadian forces during World War I.

In 1934 a black granite monument was erected on Ekman's grave by the Swedish Cellulose Association. The Carl Ekman House, a 14-story residential building on Tooley Street, Northfleet, was erected in 1969 and named in his honor.

== Sources ==
- Carruthers, George (1947). Paper-Making. Toronto: Garden City Press. pp. 158–181. Chapter VIII. The chapter is a translation of Torsten Althin's article "Carl Daniel Ekmans liv och person", Dædalus (Stockholm) 1935, with notes by Carruthers.
- Magee, Gary Bryan (1997). Productivity and Performance in the Paper Industry. Cambridge University Press. pp. 132–133. ISBN 978-0-521-89217-9.
