= M. T. Dohaney =

Canadian teacher and writer

- Born: Myrtis Theresa Judge; September 15, 1930 (age 95); Point Verde, Placentia Bay, Newfoundland
- Education: University of New Brunswick; Boston University
- Occupations: Teacher, writer
- Writing career
- Genres: Fiction, non-fiction, short stories
- Notable works: The Corrigan Women, A Marriage of Masks, A Fit Month for Dying
- Notable awards: Thomas Head Raddall Award (1995); Lieutenant-Governor’s Award for High Achievement in English Language Literary Arts (2012)

Myrtis Theresa "Jean" Dohaney (born Myrtis Theresa Judge; September 15, 1930) is a Newfoundland-born Canadian teacher and writer who lives in Fredericton, New Brunswick.

== Life and work ==
M. T. Dohaney was born to Roger and Anne Judge in Point Verde, Placentia Bay, Newfoundland. She moved to Fredericton in 1954 with her husband Walter Dohaney, whom she had married in Gander two years earlier. Dohaney attended the University of New Brunswick, where she earned a Bachelor of Arts in English Literature in 1967, as well as a teaching certificate. She received an EdD from Boston University in 1978.

In the 1980s, Dohaney began writing short stories while she and her family lived in Vancouver, British Columbia, where her husband was studying at the University of British Columbia.

In 1988, Dohaney published her first novel, The Corrigan Women, a portrait of three generations of women in Newfoundland. It was followed by When Things Get Back to Normal (1989), a journal documenting her grief after her husband Walter died in 1986. In 1992, Dohaney continued the story of The Corrigan Women with a sequel, To Scatter Stones.

In her teaching career, she first taught in the public school system in New Brunswick and then for almost twenty years at the University of New Brunswick until resigning in 1995. In that same year, she published A Marriage of Masks, which won the Thomas Head Raddall Award. With A Fit Month for Dying (2000), Dohaney completed the trilogy that began with The Corrigan Women.

In 2012, she was the recipient of the Lieutenant-Governor's Award for High Achievement in English Language Literary Arts.

== Bibliography ==
=== Novels ===
- The Corrigan Women (Ragweed Press, 1988; Goose Lane Editions, 2004)
- To Scatter Stones (Ragweed Press, 1992; Goose Lane Editions, 2005)
- A Marriage of Masks (Ragweed Press, 1995)
- A Fit Month for Dying (Goose Lane Editions, 2000)
- The Flannigans (Pennywell Books, 2007)

=== Non-fiction ===
- When Things Get Back to Normal (Pottersfield Press, 1989; Goose Lane Editions, 2002)

=== Short stories ===
- Caplin Scull: Chronicles from a Newfoundland Outport on the Eve of Confederation (Pottersfield Press, 2017)
