= Susan Low-Beer =

Canadian ceramic artist

- Born: Montreal, Quebec, Canada
- Education: BFA, Mt. Allison University, MFA Cranbrook
- Known for: Ceramic sculptor
- Awards: Saidye Bronfman Award; 1999

Susan Low-Beer is a Canadian ceramic artist whose figurative work explores psychology, domesticity and women's experience.

== Early life and education ==
Low-Beer's early career was as a painter. She studied painting under Alex Colville at Mount Allison University, completing her BFA in 1965. This was followed by an MFA at Cranbrook, which she completed in 1967. While living in California from 1968-1971, she began to experiment with clay sculpture. In 1980, Low-Beer moved to Toronto and began to focus on large figurative works in clay.

== Career ==
Low-Beer has created several notable bodies of work. Still Dances, created in 1991, combines several historical references to female forms, including Greek Cycladic sculpture and Romanesque figures, in a series of nine clay sculptures. Mutable Selves, is a series of eight clay and steel sculptures created from 1994-1995.

In 2001, Low-Beer exhibited Rocksbreath, a series of 30 press-moulded figures installed in the Burlington Art Centre courtyard, in a show curated by Jonathan Smith. Two of the figures were subsequently shown in a 2013 retrospective at the Gardiner Museum. This was followed by Tools for Daily Living (2003), a series of paper hangings incorporating clay figures reflecting her Rocksbreath work.

In 2012 she facilitated psychotheraputic workshops for women survivours of violence in partnership between the Schilfer Clinic and the Gardiner Museum. Her subsequent work, About Face, consisted of 24 ceramic heads mounted on pedestals. It was displayed along with the work of the participants in Transformation by Fire, a 2013 exhibition at the Gardiner.

Critical reviews of Low-Beer's work have been positive throughout her career, but biases against ceramic-based work, often considered a craft material, have affected her inclusion in discussions of fine art practices.

Low-Beer has taught privately from her studio, and at institutions including the Art Gallery of Ontario and Sheridan College.

== Awards ==
In 1999, Low-Beer was awarded the Saidye Bronfman Award, a craft-specific award given as part of the Governor General's Awards.
