= Lane Anderson Award =

The Lane Anderson Award is an annual award presented to Canadian non-fiction science in two categories; adult and young readers. It is funded by the Fitzhenry Family Foundation, and headed by Sharon Fitzhenry and Hollister Doll. Winners receive a plaque and a prize of 10,000 dollars. Winners are selected based on a book's relevance to current events and on its ability to relate scientific issues to everyday life.

== Winners ==
=== Young Readers ===
Year	Title	Author	Publisher
2021	It Takes Guts	Jennifer Gardy	Greystone Books
2019	Heads Up	Melanie Siebert	Orca
2018	The Space Adventurer's Guide	Peter McMahon	Kids Can Press
2017	Biometrics	Maria Birmingham	Owl Kids
2016	5 Giraffes	Anne Innis Dagg	Fitzhenry & Whiteside
2015	The Queen's Shadow	Cybèle Young	Kids Can Press
2014	Fuzzy Forensics: DNA Fingerprinting Gets Wild	L.E. Carmichael	Ashby-BP
2013	Before the World Was Ready: Stories of Daring Genius in Science	Claire Eamer	Annick Press
2012	Big Green Book of the Big Blue Sea	Helaine Becker	Kids Can Press
2011	Nowhere Else on Earth: Standing Tall for the Great Bear Rainforest	Caitlyn Vernon	Orca Book Publishers

=== Adult ===
Year	Title	Author	Publisher
2021	Ontario's Old-growth Forests 2nd edition	Michael Henry	Fitzhenry & Whiteside
2019	The Reality Bubble	Ziya Tong	Penguin Random House
2018	18 Miles	Christopher Dewdney	ECW Press
2017	Our Vanishing Glaciers	Robert William Sandford	Rocky Mountain Books
2016	At Sea With the Marine Birds of the Raincoast	Caroline Fox	Rocky Mountain Books
2015	Malignant Metaphor: Confronting Cancer Myths	Alanna Mitchell	ECW Press
2014	Your Water Footprint: The Shocking Facts About How Much Water We Use to Make Everyday Products	Stephen Leahy	Firefly Books
2013	The Peace-Athabasca Delta: Portrait of a Dynamic Ecosystem	Kevin P. Timoney	University of Alberta Press
2012	The Universe Within: From Quantum to Cosmos	Neil Turok	House of Anansi Press
2011	The Atlantic Coast: A Natural History	Harry Thurston	Greystone Books
