= George Fry =

- Born: December 26, 1929; Bromley, England
- Died: September 20, 2014 (aged 84); Saint John, New Brunswick
- Occupation(s): artist, educator, administrator
- Years active: 1950 - 2014

George Fry (26 December 1929 – 20 September 2014) was an English-born Canadian artist, educator and administrator. He was the director of the New Brunswick College of Craft and Design from 1976 to 1993.

== Education and early career ==
Fry studied illustration and theatre design at Goldsmith's College and earned a National Diploma in Design (NDD). While a student at Goldsmith's he worked in the properties department at The Old Vic, where he made papier-mâché masks for a production of The Snow Queen.

Fry contacted Annette Mills after seeing her performing with her puppet Muffin the Mule on the BBC television program For the Children in late 1949. She engaged him to create a new puppet, Prudence Kitten, who first appeared with her on For the Children in June 1950. Fry worked with Mills at the BBC for five years. He later worked as a freelance illustrator and lectured on art history at Ravensbourne College of Art.

== Career in Canada ==
Fry emigrated in 1963 and settled in New Brunswick, where he was hired as a teacher by John Hooper, the Saint John city schools art director. In 1966 he became co-ordinator of art education for the city. In 1976 he was appointed director of the New Brunswick School of Arts and Crafts in Fredericton. As director he introduced foundation courses in "design drawing and art history and photography" shifting the school's emphasis from "craft training to craft education". He also introduced a Native studies program, under the leadership of Elder Gwen Bear.

When Fry retired from the New Brunswick College of Craft and Design in 1993 he became a full-time artist. His primary artistic practice was mask-making. His solo exhibition "Creatures of Fancy" opened the New Brunswick Fine Crafts Centre in Fredericton in 1998. During his career Fry was involved in over 45 group and solo exhibitions.

Fry designed the masks and costumes for The Enchanted Forest, the ninth in R. Murray Schafer's Patria series of music theatre works.

Fry died on 20 September 2014. In 2015 the exhibition gallery at the New Brunswick College of Craft and Design was renamed The George Fry Gallery.

== Honours ==
- New Brunswick Excellence Award for cultural development and arts education (1994)
- Queen Elizabeth II Golden Jubilee Medal for service to Canada (2003)
