= John Hooper (sculptor) =

- Born: 1926
- Died: 26 January 2006 (aged 79–80)
- Education: Royal College of Art; Bournemouth College of Art
- Occupation: Sculptor
- Known for: Wood carvings

John Hooper, OC RCA (1926 – 26 January 2006) was an English-born Canadian sculptor known for his colourful polychromed wood carvings. His works can be found on public display in many locations throughout Canada and worldwide.

== Biography ==
Born in England, Hooper also spent time in his youth in China, and served as a captain in the British Army in India in 1944. Hooper was educated at the Royal College of Art and Bournemouth College of Art (now The Arts Institute at Bournemouth), and studied with sculptor Jacob Epstein. After teaching at the University of Natal in South Africa from 1956 to 1962, he moved to New Brunswick, Canada, where he lived for the rest of his life, for many years working as a school teacher and administrator before devoting himself full-time to art in 1974.

Hooper was married to Kathy, an artist from South Africa who herself won the Strathbutler Award in 1994. With her he had four children and founded Hooper Studios, a centre for art and art education in Hampton, New Brunswick.

== Works on public display ==
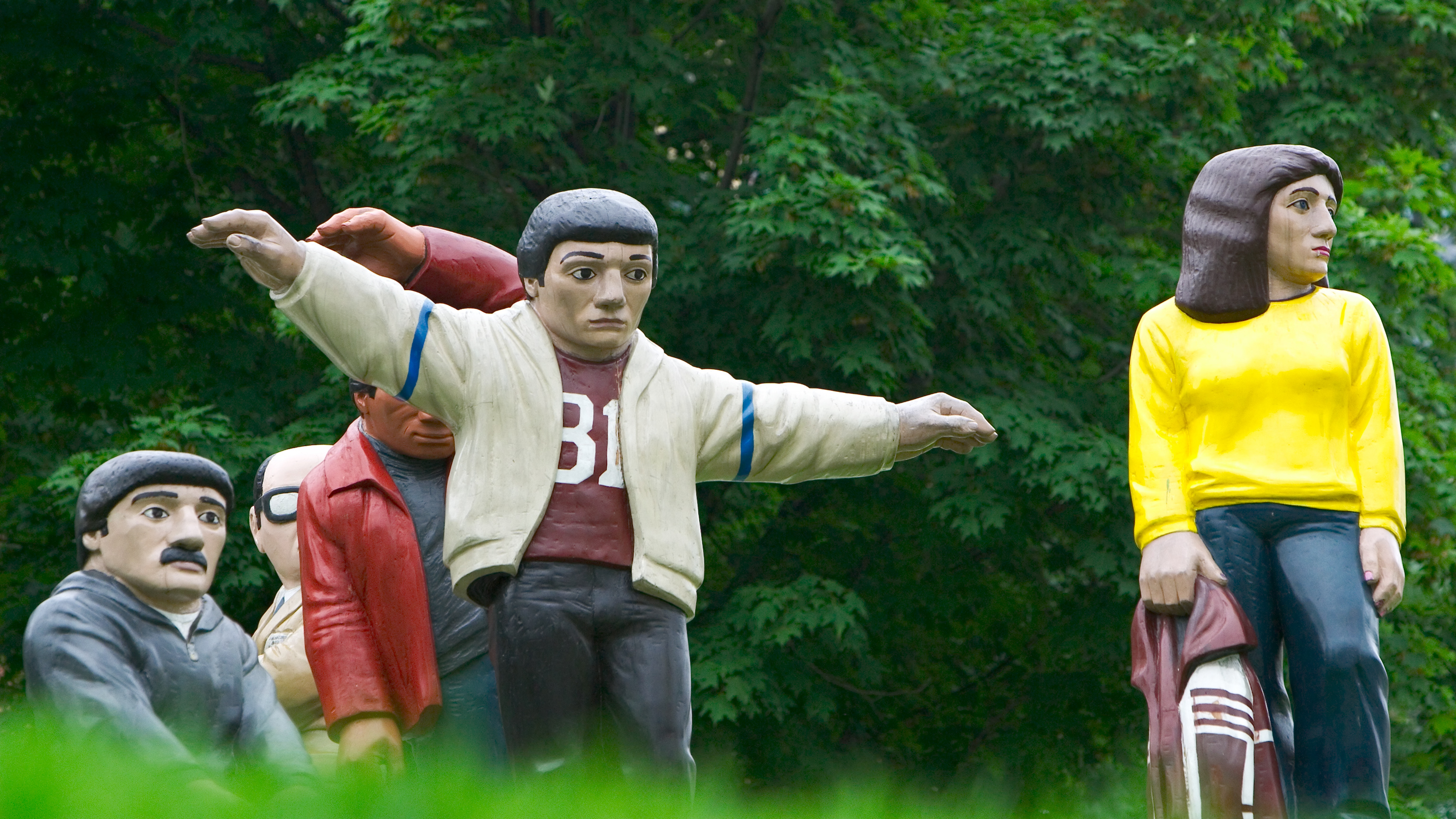
"Balancing" outside the National Arts Centre in Ottawa, Ontario

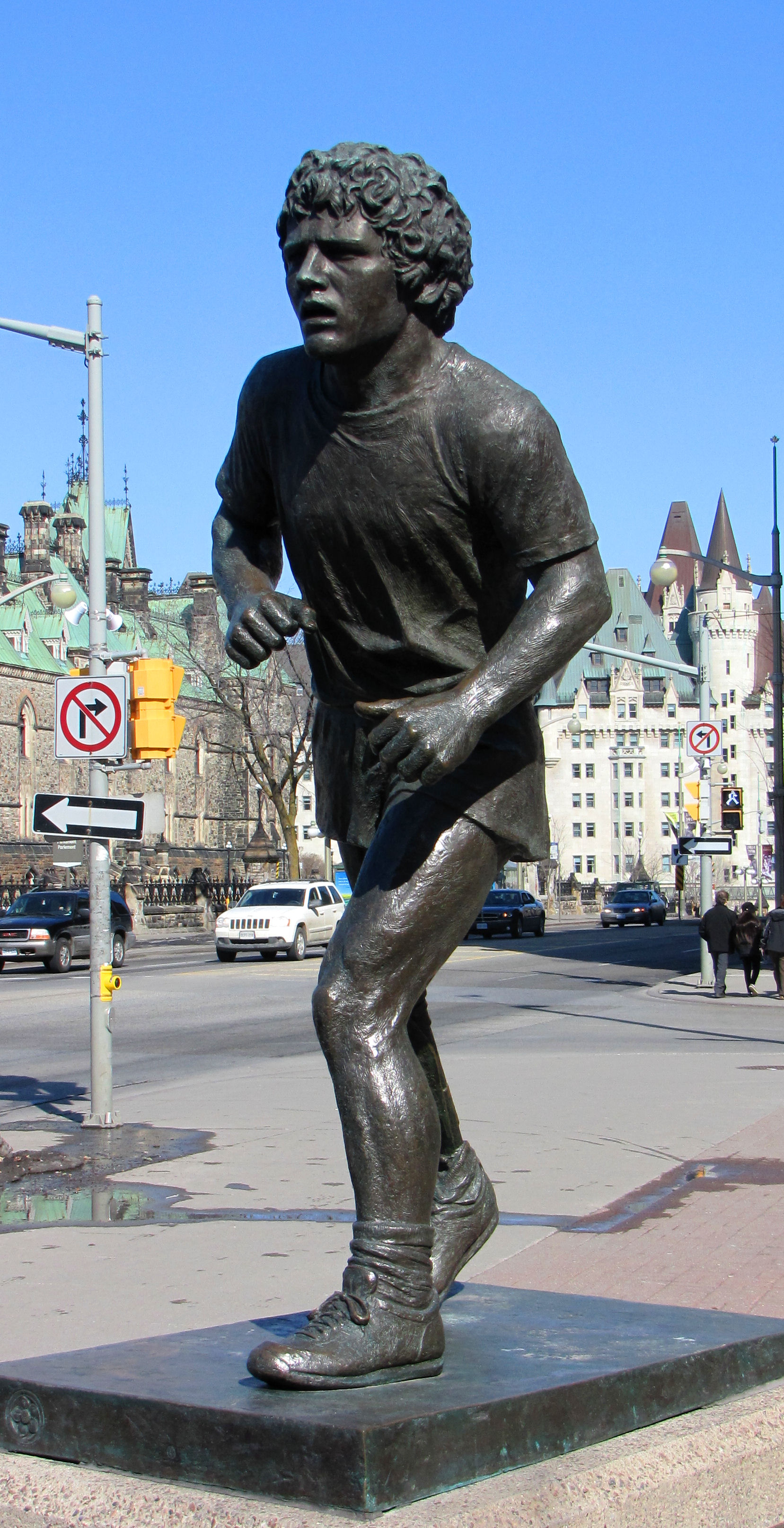
Terry Fox in Ottawa, Ontario

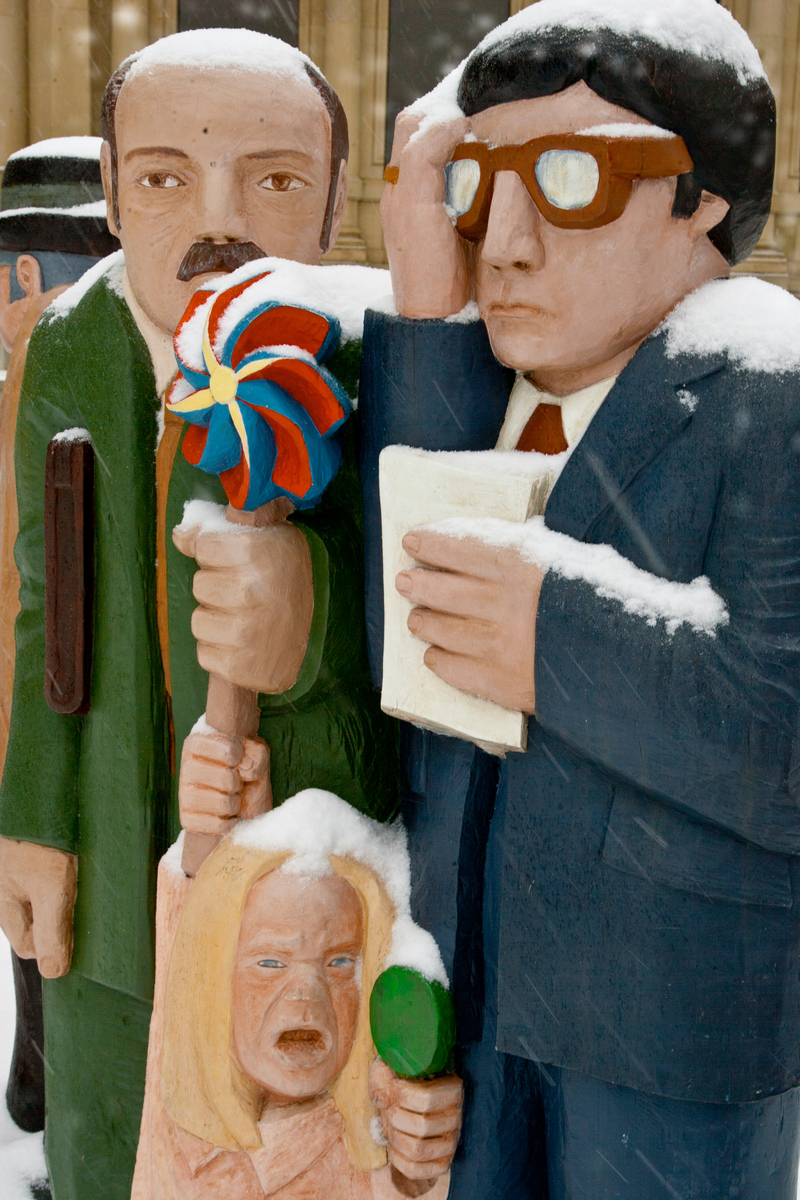
"People Waiting" in Saint John, New Brunswick

Hooper's art can be seen in Market Square and outside the National Arts Centre in Ottawa, in Sinclair Centre in Vancouver, at the Centennial Building in Fredericton, New Brunswick, and in several places around Saint John, New Brunswick, and at the Pilgrim School in Los Angeles. The New Brunswick Museum houses several more of his works as does the Art Gallery of Nova Scotia. His bronze statue of Terry Fox stands on Wellington Street in Ottawa, across the street from the national Parliament Buildings.

== Awards and honours ==
In 1991, Hooper was the first recipient of the Strathbutler Award For Fine Craft And Visual Arts, a $10,000 annual award given by the Sheila Hugh Mackay Foundation for New Brunswick artists. In 2000, he won the Miller Brittain Award for Excellence in Visual Arts from the New Brunswick Art Board. He was made a member of the Royal Canadian Academy of Arts. On 27 April 2000, he was made an Officer of the Order of Canada.

== Additional sources ==
- Artist's statement, John Hooper, Hooper Studios.
- "John Hooper's Way With Wood" (1977), an 18-minute documentary sponsored by the National Film Board of Canada, on IMDb.
- Tom Smart, "L'univers de John Hooper", Goose Lane Editions, 2001, ISBN 978-0-920674-27-7.
