= Peter Powning =

Canadian artist and sculptor working in ceramics, metals, and glass

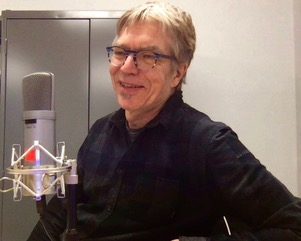
- Born: 1949 (age 76–77)
- Occupations: Artist, sculptor
- Spouse: Beth Powning
- Children: Jake Powning
- Awards: Honorary Doctorate, UNB (2014); Lieutenant Governor’s Award for High Achievement in the Arts (2017); Saidye Bronfman Award (2006)
- Website: powning.com/peter

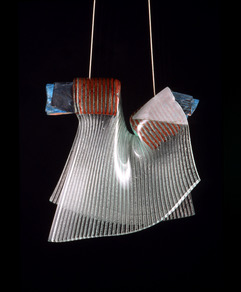
Shrug, 2003

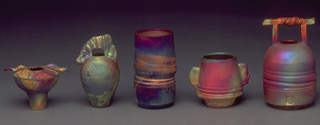
Jewel Pots, 1996

Peter Powning RCA is a Canadian artist and sculptor working in ceramics, metals, and glass. Since 1970, he has explored a wide range of artistic forms while working concurrently as an activist and arts advocate.

== Life and work ==
Powning was born in 1949, in Providence, Rhode Island. He grew up in Bristol, Connecticut, and attended the University of Connecticut, where his studies included ceramics and sculpture.

In 1968, Peter met Beth Powning through mutual friends in New York City, and they were married the following year at Beth's parents farm in rural Connecticut. In 1970 the pair relocated to rural New Brunswick, Canada, sharing a desire to live close to the land in as self-sufficient way as possible. They bought an 1870s farmhouse near the town of Sussex, where they still reside, and Peter built his first studio in a converted grain shed.

In the mid-1970s, the Pownings began a sojourn in Europe, and in 1976 Peter enrolled at the Croyden College of Design and Technology in London. There, he expanded his artistic scope through the study of techniques such as mould casting, slip screening and photo silk-screening, and was exposed to new ideas in the pottery field. In 1977, he showed his work at the Warehouse Gallery in London, and, following the Pownings’ return to Canada, he began to hold solo exhibitions at galleries in New Brunswick, all the while experimenting with new techniques and materials. His first Canada Council grant supported a sculptural project with integrated voice and sound recording elements. Some of the sculptures later went to the National Sound Symposium in Newfoundland.

Throughout the 1980s, Powning grew his artistic practice as well as connections in the Canadian art community. He was a regular participant at the One of a Kind Show in Toronto, where he made connections with galleries across the country. He began working with bronze casting, and by the end of the decade had built a foundry and glasswork facility at his home studio. He also began working extensively with the American raku technique. The 1980s also saw the beginning of Powning's participation in public art competitions, which to date has resulted in 17 public commissions in four provinces. By the 1990s, Powning's work expanded to include cast bronze, steel, slumped and cast glass, and clay.

In addition to an increased focus on public sculpture commissions, Powning's more recent work has included experiments with breaking and reassembling of porcelain—a variation of the Japanese kintsugi technique—and images of altered books (in the ocean, baked, terra-formed).

In 2022, a touring 50-year retrospective was mounted by the Beaverbrook Art Gallery curated by John Leroux. In conjunction with the exhibition, the book Peter Powning: A Retrospective was published by Goose Lane Editions.

Peter Powning was granted an honorary doctorate by the University of New Brunswick in 2014 and is the recipient of 2017 Lieutenant Governor’s Award for High Achievement in the Arts and the 2006 Saidye Bronfman Award, which is part of the Governor General’s Awards in Visual and Media Arts

== Activism and advocacy ==
Running parallel to Powning's life of artistic production and has been his activities in promoting the arts and artists in his region. Soon after his arrival in Canada in 1970, he began building a network of associations with local artists and craftspeople. He attended his first New Brunswick Craftsmen's Council (now known as Craft NB) meeting in the fall of 1972.

In 1981 he presented a brief to the Canada Council advocating for a move away from the “centralized arts hierarchy” towards more opportunity for artists in rural and regional Canada. In 1983, Powning, along with fellow artist John Hooper, approached the developers of the Market Square complex in Saint John to include public art into a large-scale development, leading to Powning being hired as a consultant and the commissioning of numerous works, including his own first such commission, Strata 1.

In February 1986, the New Brunswick Arts Council and the Conseil de promotion et diffusion de la culture, of which Powning was a member, presented a brief to Premier Richard Hatfield calling for the creation of a Premier's Advisory Committee on the Arts.

Powning has served on the Premier’s Advisory Committee on the Arts (which became the New Brunswick Arts Board), the advisory Council of the New Brunswick College of Craft and Design and as a founding Director and board president of the Arts and Culture Centre of Sussex.
