= Fred Ross (artist) =

Canadian muralist and painter

- Born: Frederick Joseph Ross; May 12, 1927; Saint John, New Brunswick
- Died: 19 August 2014 (aged 87)

Frederick Joseph Ross (May 12, 1927 – August 19, 2014) CM ONB RCA LL. D. was a New Brunswick based Canadian artist best known for his figurative drawings, paintings and murals.

== Early life ==
Ross was born in on May 12, 1927 in Saint John, New Brunswick, to parents Ernest L. Ross and Elizabeth Drake. He studied art at the Saint John Vocational School. Ross received a bachelor of fine arts from Mount Allison University and a bachelor of education from the University of New Brunswick. Ross went on to create a number of notable murals in the Maritimes, including one in Fredericton and on Prince Edward Island . He returned to teach at Saint John Vocational School from the 1950s until 1970, becoming the head of its art department. He married Sheila Urquhart in 1954.

== Career ==
In 1946, Ross began work on a commissioned mural work that would become The Destruction of War & Rebuilding the World through Education, a memorial mural to 63 students of Fredericton High School who had died in World War II. After its unveiling in 1948, the mural was later dismantled and lost in the 1950s. It was recreated by Ross and several apprentices in 2011, in a plan developed by the artist William Forrestall and based on the original 1948 full scale cartoons (preparatory drawings) Ross had mistakenly left at the New Brunswick Museum. The chance discovery of the full-scale mural drawings, now housed at the National Gallery of Canada, provided what would eventually become a treasure map-like route to the mural's restoration. With what grew to be nationwide support, three studio assistants, who were guided by Fred Ross and the drawings that he had created more than 60 years earlier, retraced the developmental process of the mural in what would prove to be the most ambitious reanimation of a cultural treasure in Canadian art history. This unprecedented story of the mural's history — its creation, loss, and eventual restoration and return to public prominence is documented in the text "Redeemed: Restoring the Lost Fred Ross Mural", written and edited by William Forrestall, and published by the University of New Brunswick.

In 1967, Ross' work was shown at Expo 67 in Montreal. The Beaverbrook Art Gallery held a retrospective exhibition of his work titled The Art of Fred Ross - A Timeless Humanism curated by Tom Smart in 1993. Ross' work is held in the National Gallery of Canada, the New Brunswick Museum, the Beaverbrook Art Gallery, the Art Gallery of Nova Scotia and other collections.

== Awards ==
Ross received the Order of Canada in 2004. He was awarded with an honorary doctorate of laws from the University of New Brunswick in 1984 and the Order of New Brunswick in 2008.
