= Gerard Collins (artist) =

Canadian painter (born 1957)

Gerard Collins (born 1957) is a Canadian painter.

== Early life and education ==
Collins was born in Saint John, New Brunswick. He studied initially at St. Martin’s School of Art in London, England, ultimately completing a BFA degree at the Nova Scotia College of Art and Design. He later studied under Gerhard Richter at the Staaliche Kunstakademie in Dusseldorf, Germany.

== Career ==
In 2001, Collins received the Strathbutler Award for New Brunswick artists. Collins' work is held in the collections of the National Gallery of Canada, The Art Gallery of Nova Scotia and the New Brunswick Museum.
