= Beth Powning =

Canadian author

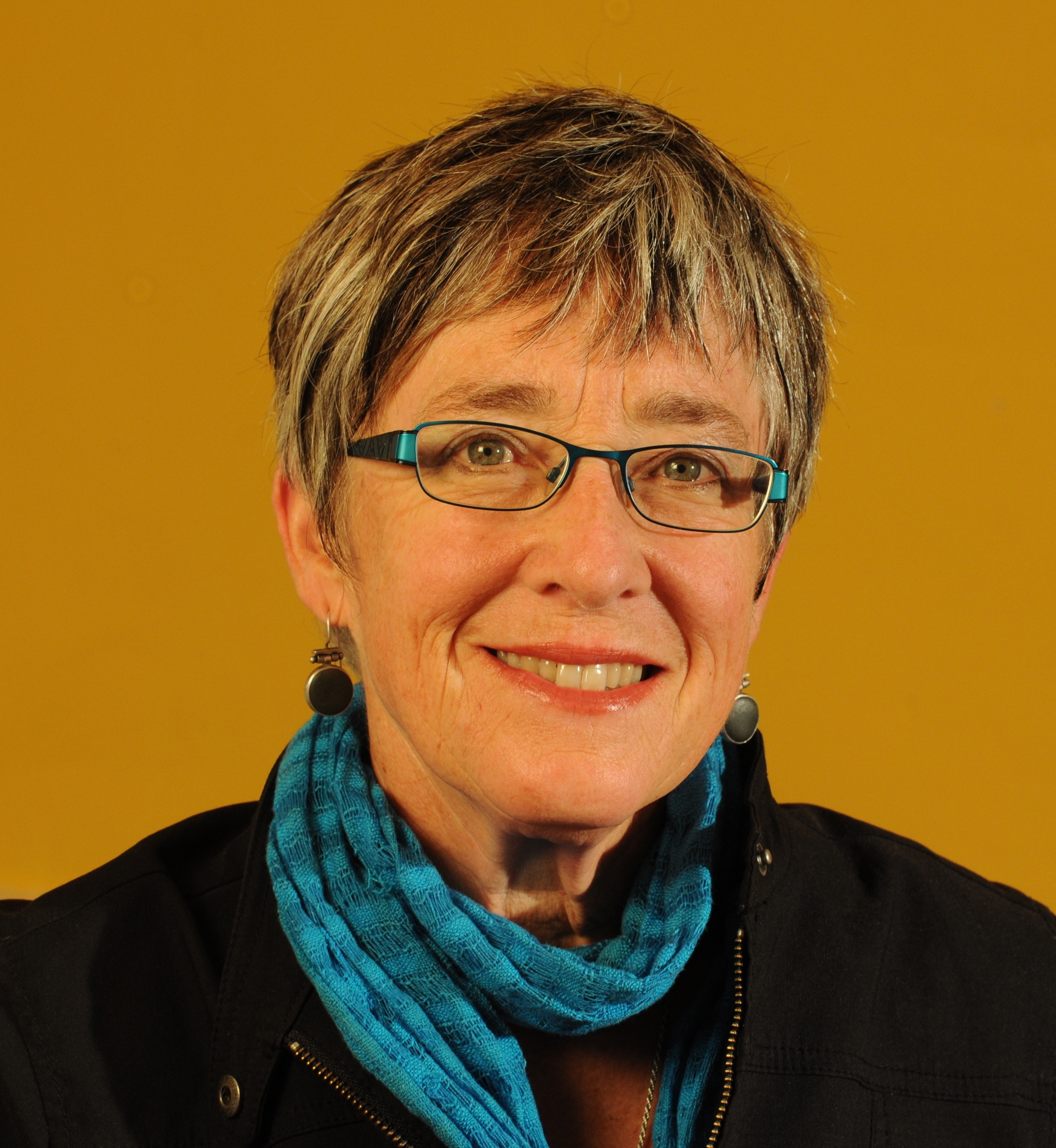
- Powning in 2020
- Born: August 15, 1949 (age 77); Putnam, Connecticut, United States
- Education: Sarah Lawrence College (BA, 1972)
- Occupations: Writer, photographer
- Spouse: Peter Powning (m. 1969)
- Children: 2
- Writing career
- Notable works: The Sister's Tale, A Measure of Light, The Sea Captain's Wife
- Notable awards: Lieutenant-Governor's Award for High Achievement in the Arts
- Website: powning.com/beth

Powning discusses The Sea Captain's Wife on Bookbits

Beth Davis Powning is a Canadian writer and photographer. She is best known for her novels, which explore themes of nature, history, and personal resilience. Her work often reflects her connection to the natural world, drawing on her experiences living in rural New Brunswick. Her works include Seeds of Another Summer (1996), The Hatbox Letters (2004), A Measure of Light (2015) and The Sister’s Tale (2021).

== Early life and education ==
Beth Davis Powning was born on August 15, 1949, in Putnam, Connecticut and was raised in a Quaker family.

She received a Bachelor of Arts in creative writing from Sarah Lawrence College in 1972. She also received an honorary Doctor of Letters from the University of New Brunswick in 2014. Her husband, Canadian artist Peter Powning also received an honorary doctorate at the same ceremony. In 2020, Beth Powning received an honorary Doctor of Laws from Mount Allison University in 2020.

== Career ==
Though Powning had always been interested in pursuing writing, she began her career running a pottery business with her husband on their old farmhouse in Sussex, New Brunswick. After beginning to take photographs, Powning published her first book, Seeds of Another Summer (1996), published as Home: Chronicle of a North Country Life in the United States. The book incorporates essays and photographs. Home won the 1996 New England Booksellers Association Discovery Award and was shortlisted for the 2000 Rutstrum Author's Award.

Following Seeds of Another Summer, Powning wrote two memoirs: Shadow Child (1999), a memoir about grief and healing, and Edge Seasons (2005), a memoir of personal transformation. Shadow Child was shortlisted for the 2000 Edna Staebler Award.

Powning has also written several novels. Her first novel, The Hatbox Letters (2004), delves into themes of memory and loss. It was shortlisted for the Bookseller's Choice Award at the 2005 Atlantic Book Awards and was longlisted for the 2006 Dublin Literary Award. In 2010, Powning published The Sea Captain’s Wife (2010), which explores the life of a woman navigating love and duty in the 19th century. The novel received the Barnes & Noble Discovery Award, was shortlisted for the Thomas Head Raddall Atlantic Fiction Award, and was longlisted for the Dublin Literary Award. Powning's next novel, A Measure of Light (2015), was a historical novel set in 17th-century New England. The Globe and Mail named it one of the best books of 2015. It also won the 2016 Mrs. Dunster's Fiction Prize, and was longlisted for the Dublin Literary Award. Powning's most recent novel,The Sister’s Tale (2021), is about three women confronting their pasts. It won the 2022 Mrs. Dunster's Fiction Prize.

In addition to writing books, Powning has published non-fiction works and contributed to various literary anthologies. She has received several awards and nominations for her writing, including New Brunswick’s Lieutenant Governor’s Award for High Achievement in English Language Literary Arts.

Beyond writing, Powning's photographs have been featured in the work of Robert Osborne, including Roses for Canadian Gardens (1991), Hardy Trees and Shrubs (1994), and Hardy Apples (2022).

== Personal life ==
In 1968, Powning met Canadian artist Peter Powning through mutual friends in New York City. They were married the following year at Beth's parents farm in rural Connecticut. In 1970, the pair relocated to rural New Brunswick, Canada, sharing a desire to live close to the land in as self-sufficient way as possible. They bought an 1870s farmhouse near the town of Sussex, New Brunswick, where they still resided as of 2020, and Peter built his first studio in a converted grain shed. The farmhouse has served as inspiration for many of Powning's books.

The Pownings had two children, one of whom was stillborn.

== Publications ==
=== As author ===
- Seeds of Another Summer. New York: Stewart, Tabori & Chang. 1996.
- Shadow Child: An Apprenticeship in Love and Loss. New York: Carroll & Graf. 1999.
- The Hatbox Letters. Toronto: Knopf Canada. 2004.
- Edge Seasons. Toronto: Knopf Canada. 2005.

=== As photographer ===
- Osborne, Robert (1991). Roses for Canadian Gardens. Toronto: Key Porter Books.
- Osborne, Robert (1994). Hardy Trees and Shrubs: A Guide to Disease-Resistant Varieties for the North. Toronto: Key Porter Books.
