= Suzanne Hill =

Canadian artist

Suzanne Hill (born 1943) is a Canadian artist.

== Career ==
In 1999 Hill received the Strathbutler Award for New Brunswick artists. Hill's work is held in the collections of the New Brunswick Museum and the Beaverbrook Art Gallery.
