= Burton Kramer =

Canadian graphic designer

Burton Kramer CM OOnt
- Born: 1932 (age 93–94)
- Education: MFA Yale University School of Arts & Architecture, BSc Institute of Design of IIT, Fulbright Scholar Royal College of Art London
- Known for: graphic design, artist
- Notable work: Ontario Educational Communications Authority 1971, Canadian Broadcasting Corporation 1974, Radio Canada International 1975, National Research Council (Canada) 1989
- Awards: Order of Ontario, Queen's Diamond Jubilee Medal, Order of Canada

Burton Kramer CM OOnt (born 1932) is an American-born Canadian graphic designer and artist who lives and works in Toronto.

== Early life and education ==
Kramer was born in 1932 in New York City. He graduated with a BSc from The Institute of Design, Chicago in Visual Communication and an MFA in Graphic Design from Yale University.

== Career ==
Kramer began working in the late 1950s for Will Burtin. He was an Assistant Art Director of Architectural Record, later worked for Geigy Chemical and Pharmaceuticals In Ardsley, New York, and then as Art Director at the Erwin Halpern advertising agency in Zurich, Switzerland. He moved to Toronto in late 1965. His work was prominent at Expo 67, where he designed the map and directory system. His work from this period shows the influence of Op art.

CBC logo (1974) designed by Burton Kramer

Kramer is well known for designing the distinctive 1974 Canadian Broadcasting Corporation logo, consisting of a stylized letter "C" (for Canada) radiating in all directions, representing broadcasting. In 1966–67, he was Director of Corporate Design for Clairtone and redesigned their logo and many other aspects of their graphic identity.

In late 1967 he founded Kramer Design Associates Limited, a multi-media firm specializing in corporate identity programs, signage systems and print. Kramer was a professor at the Ontario College of Art and Design (part-time faculty) for 21 years, and lectured at universities in Mexico, Canada, the U.S. and Switzerland. Kramer is currently active as an artist, showing his geometric abstractions at galleries in Canada and abroad.

== Honours ==
Kramer has been a member of AGI, Alliance Graphique Internationale, and an Academician of the Royal Canadian Academy of Art since 1974. He was awarded GDC Fellowship in 1975. He was made a member of the Order of Ontario in 2002, the first graphic designer to be inducted into the order. He received an honorary Doctorate (D.Des.) from the Ontario College of Art & Design in 2003. In 2015 he was awarded the Art Directors and Designers of Canada Usherwood Lifetime Achievement Award. In 2018 he received The Order of Canada C.M.

Kramer's work was featured in the Smithsonian Institution and the Library of Congress. He has archives of his work in the collections of the Royal Ontario Museum, Toronto, and the Vignelli Center at Rochester Institute of Technology.
