= New Brunswick College of Craft and Design =

Arts college in Fredericton, Canada

- Type: Public
- Established: 1950
- Affiliation: CICan
- Dean: Anna Mathis
- Director: Jared Peters
- Academic staff: 70
- Students: 282
- Location: Fredericton, New Brunswick, Canada; 45.9628°N 66.6414°W
- Campus: Urban
- Website: www.nbccd.ca

The New Brunswick College of Craft and Design (NBCCD) is a public art college in Fredericton, New Brunswick, Canada. The college's campus is located in downtown Fredericton, near the Saint John River. The college offers several fine arts and design diploma programs.

The college was formed from the outgrowth of art education initiatives undertaken by the provincial government. The college was established as the New Brunswick School of Arts and Crafts in 1950. In 1980, the college relocated to its present downtown location. In 2010, the college was separated from the New Brunswick Community College system.

== History ==
In 1938, the New Brunswick government created an outreach training program in an attempt to supplement workers' income beyond traditional seasonal work in fishing, farming and forestry. This endeavour was the initial impetus for what would later become the New Brunswick College of Craft and Design. With a break during World War II, the program re-emerged with a location at Hut #43 at Exhibition Court in Fredericton and in 1946 Dr. Ivan Crowell was hired from McGill University. Crowell would have a major impact on the development of the province’s craft industry.

Dr. Crowell established a Handicraft Training Center at Exhibition Court in Fredericton (equipped to teach woodturning, weaving on floor and table looms, rug hooking, braiding and weaving, leather work, and cutting and polishing gemstones) and in 1950 a summer school at Fundy National Park called the New Brunswick School of Arts and Crafts.

Since then, the College has been located at the Palmer MacLellan Building on Argyle Street in the late 1960s, the Huts at the Old Army Barracks at St. Anne’s Point on Woodstock Road in 1970 under the leadership of Allan Crimmins and finally in 1980 the permanent location, then known as the Old Liquor Commission Warehouse on Queen Street under the direction of George Fry. On May 30, 2010, as part of the Provincial government’s action plan for post-secondary education, the College separated from the community college system, remaining under the umbrella of the Department of Post-Secondary Education, Training and Labour. In 2011, the College added the newly renovated Barracks Building which at one time housed the Fredericton Temperance Reform Club.

== Academics ==
NBCCD views its strength as its ability to prepare students for success in the workplace by having adaptable and transferable design making and entrepreneurial skills at their disposal. The college's programs include:

- 1-year Certificate Programs in Foundation Visual Arts (FVA) and Advanced Studio Practice
- 2-year Diplomas in 3D Digital Design, Ceramics, Fashion Design, Graphic Design, Jewellery/Metal Arts, Photography, Textile Design, and Wabanaki Visual Arts (WVA)
- 2+2 (4-year) Bachelor of Applied Arts (BAA) Degree with the University of New Brunswick (UNB)

The College features studio-based education with a focus on hands-on entrepreneurship. They offer a four-year Bachelor of Applied Arts (BAA) in partnership with the University of New Brunswick (UNB). The New Brunswick College of Craft and Design offers a range of programs from traditional craft studios to contemporary digital design, as well as a Wabanaki Visual Art Program, which features the history and traditional crafts of the Wolastoqey, Mi'Kmaq, and Passamaquoddy First Nations cultures in Atlantic Canada.

NBCCD is also home to non-credit courses, craft workshops called edVentures, and the George Fry Gallery.

=== Articulation Agreements ===
The four-year Bachelor of Applied Arts (BAA) articulation between the University of New Brunswick and the New Brunswick College of Craft & Design offers a combination of academic and practical study, aiming to promote the advanced reasoning, research, and writing skills of a traditional liberal arts education at UNB along with the hands-on experience of studio art courses offered by the New Brunswick College of Craft and Design.

The BAA is a four-year degree program, two years of which are taken at the New Brunswick College of Craft and Design (NBCCD) and the remaining two years (60 credit hours) at the University of New Brunswick Fredericton (UNBF). The two required years at NBCCD will generally consist of the Foundation Visual Arts Certificate and the first year of a Diploma. Students may start at either institution, may attend each school in alternate years, or complete the requirements of one before moving on to another.

=== International partnerships ===
The New Brunswick College of Craft and Design was one of eight Canadian colleges chosen to lead post-secondary initiatives in Brazil as part of the bilateral "Mulheres Mils" project. The partnership was designed to train disadvantaged Brazilian women, in northern and northeastern states of the country, in fashion, handicrafts, and other skills.

== Student life ==
The focus on entrepreneurship is aimed students wanting to develop commercial or artistic collections, work in the industry, or start a business. The program attracts a wide range of people. Typically, one third are aged older than 35. NBCCD classes have an average of 12 students, to help maintain focus on to one-on-one mentorship.

== See also ==
- Higher education in New Brunswick
- List of art schools
- List of colleges in New Brunswick
