= Thaddeus Holownia =

Photographer

Thaddeus Holownia RCA FRSC ONB
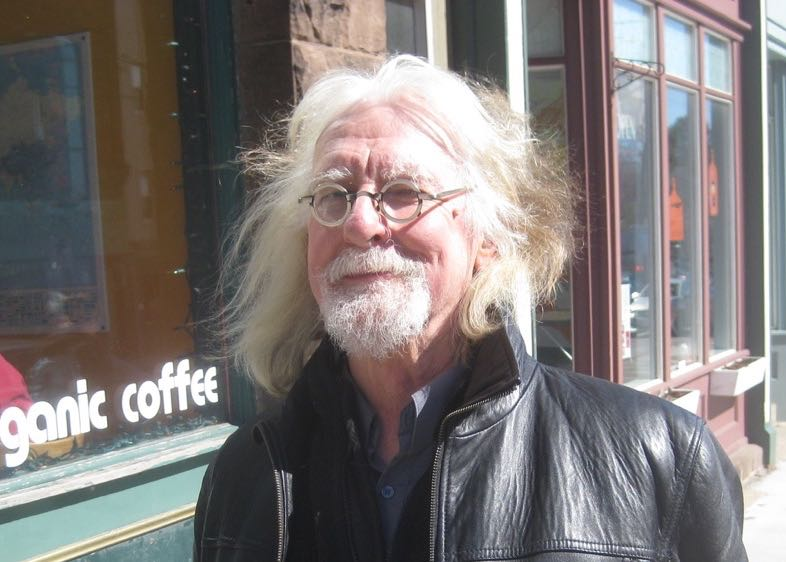
- Thaddeus Holownia in 2016
- Born: July 2, 1949 (age 77); Bury St Edmunds, England
- Education: University of Windsor
- Known for: Photographer
- Awards: member in 2000, Royal Canadian Academy of Arts, Canada Council for the Arts, American Institute of Graphic Arts, Ontario Arts Council, Social Sciences and Humanities Research Council, Fulbright Fellowship (2001)

Thaddeus Holownia RCA FRSC ONB (born July 2, 1949) is a British-born Canadian artist and professor. He taught photography at Mount Allison University and served as the head of the Fine Arts Department, retiring in 2018.

== Career ==
Born in England, Thaddeus Holownia emigrated to Canada with his family when he was five. He attended the University of Windsor, studying printmaking and communications and graduated in 1972. Initially part of Toronto's art scene, he worked as a film editor before working at the National Film Board of Canada and later joined the faculty of the Mount Allison University Fine Arts Department in 1977.

== Art work ==
In Holownia’s large-scale photographs, he uses the idea of heightened perception to explore the traces humankind leaves on the landscape. He often photographs the same sites and subjects over time, recording long-term transformations in detail. About his work, he echoes Thoreau's observation, "It's not what you look at that matters, it's what you see". He favours a large-format banquet camera. Holownia's pre-1989 work has been described as capturing the "slow violence" of environmental disaster. An early series Holownia shot in Toronto features people posing with cars in urban areas that had been abandoned in favour of car-friendly suburbs.

His photographs have been the subject of numerous exhibitions, including a 40-year retrospective, The Nature of Nature, The Photographs of Thaddeus Holownia 1976–2016, at the Art Gallery of Nova Scotia; The Terra Nova Suite, a 25 year survey of his work in Newfoundland & Labrador at the Provincial Gallery (The Rooms) in St. John's, Newfoundland; 24 Tree Studies for Henry David Thoreau at the Beaverbrook Art Gallery in Fredericton, New Brunswick, and the Heckscher Museum in Huntington, New York. His 1998 retrospective exhibition, Extended Vision: Photographs by Thaddeus Holownia 1978–1997, organized by the Canadian Museum of Contemporary Photography, traveled across Canada and to the Centro de la Imagen in Mexico City. His photographs have been included in numerous group exhibitions, including Monet’s Legacy: Series, Order and Obsession at the Hamburger Kunsthalle, Hamburg, Germany, and Car Culture at the Heckscher Museum in Huntington, New York. In 2020, his photographs of the stone lintels in Paris were exhibited at the Beaverbrook Art Gallery. The show titled Thaddeus Holownia: Lintels of Paris accompanied a book about the lintels published at the same time.

Holownia's photographs are in public collections such as the National Gallery of Canada, Ottawa and many eastern Canadian galleries, such as the Art Gallery of Nova Scotia, Halifax (27 works).

== Honours ==
In 2000, Holownia was elected to the Royal Canadian Academy of Arts and in 2001, he received a Fulbright Fellowship. Holownia has been the recipient of grants and awards from the Canada Council for the Arts, the Ontario Arts Council, the American Institute of Graphic Arts, the Royal Canadian Academy of Arts, and the Social Sciences and Humanities Research Council. In 2015, he was named to the Order of New Brunswick. In 2018, he was inducted into the Royal Society of Canada.

Thaddeus Holownia now lives in Jolicure, New Brunswick.
