= Saidye Bronfman Award =

Fine craft award

- Description: Canada's most prestigious award for excellence in fine crafts
- Country: Canada
- Presented by: Canada Council for the Arts

The Saidye Bronfman Award is a Canadian award for fine craft. It is one of the largest individual visual-arts prizes in Canada. The $25,000 annual prize is administered by the Canada Council for the Arts as one of the Governor General’s Awards in Visual and Media Arts. Each year the Canadian Museum of History acquires a work from the winning artist for its collection. The award was created in 1977 to honour the 80th birthday of Saidye Bronfman by The Samuel and Saidye Bronfman Family Foundation through a $1.5 million endowment.

== See also ==
List of Laureates
