= New Brunswick Museum =

New Brunswick Museum Musée du Nouveau-Brunswick
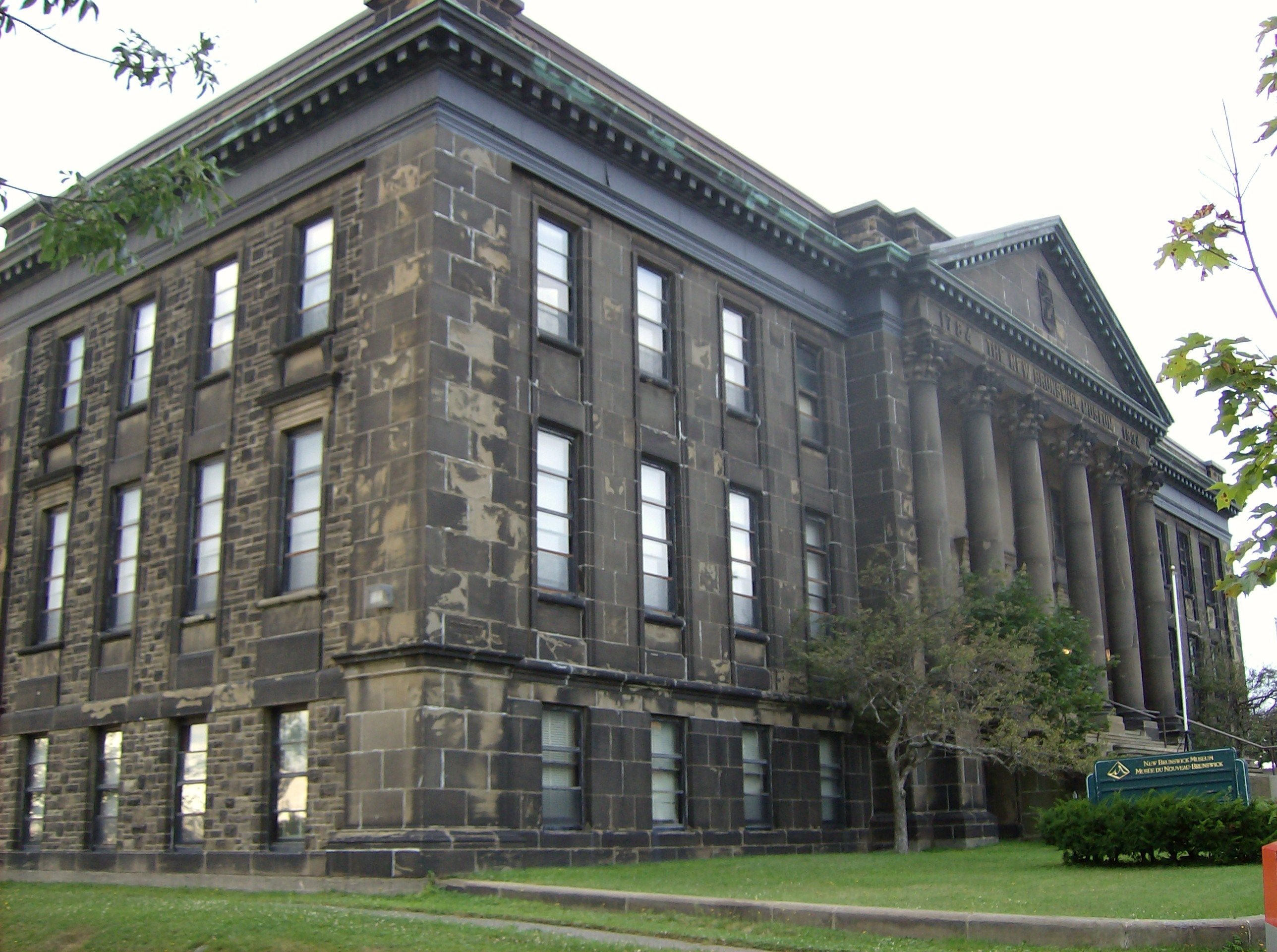
- Established: 1842
- Location: Saint John, New Brunswick, Canada
- Coordinates: 45.2729°N 66.0651°W
- Type: provincial museum
- Visitors: 32,584 (2017)
- Website: www.nbm-mnb.ca

The New Brunswick Museum, located in Saint John, New Brunswick, is Canada's oldest continuing museum. The New Brunswick Museum was incorporated as the "Provincial Museum" in 1929 and received its current name in 1930, but its history goes back much further. Its lineage can be traced back another 88 years to 1842 and to the work of Dr. Abraham Gesner.

== History ==
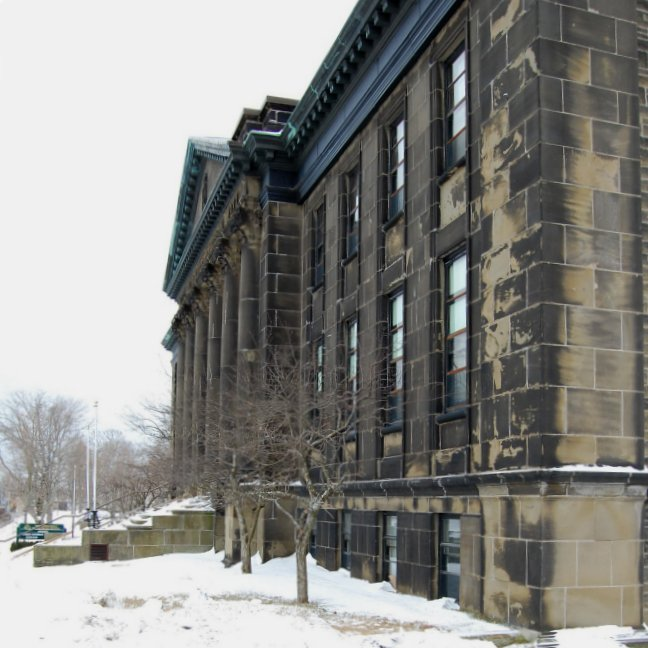
The New Brunswick Museum was opened on Douglas Avenue in 1934, the 150th anniversary of the founding of the province. In 1996, exhibitions were moved to Market Square. In 2023, it was announced that The Douglas Avenue facility would again become home to the New Brunswick Museum, with plans underway for a $150-million refurbishment and major addition.

On 5 April 1842, Abraham Gesner opened the Museum of Natural History, the precursor of the New Brunswick Museum, in one room of the Mechanics' Institute on Carleton Street, in Saint John. Income from his newly founded museum was not enough to solve Gesner's financial problems. In 1843, his collection passed on to his creditors who, in turn, donated it to the Saint John Mechanics' Institute.

Renamed the Mechanics' Institute Museum in 1846, an annual report dating from 1863 described it as, "a large and valuable collection of minerals, a great variety of zoological specimens, and many Chinese, Indian and other curiosities [that] frequently receives additions from foreign sea captains and others who get into their possession foreign articles of an attractive description."

When the Mechanics' Institute closed in 1890, the Natural History Society of New Brunswick acquired the collection and the museum was moved, first to the then new Market Building then, in 1906, to 72 Union Street. Under the care of its curator and later director, the entomologist Dr. William McIntosh, the museum's collections and activities expanded until a new building was essential. In 1934 a new provincial museum facility on Douglas Avenue was officially opened by Prime Minister R.B. Bennett.

As of 1942, the collections, building and properties of the museum officially became the property of the people of New Brunswick. Today, a provincial institution funded by the Province of New Brunswick, the New Brunswick Museum continues to collect, preserve, study and exhibit the Province's natural and cultural heritage. As well as having a remarkable natural sciences collection, the museum has expanded to include one of the largest collections of 19th-century decorative arts and Canadiana in the Atlantic provinces.

=== Expansion ===
By 1992, the museum had outgrown its Douglas Avenue location, and plans were made to develop new exhibition galleries in a central Saint John location. In April 1996, the New Brunswick Museum was opened at Market Square in leased space in uptown Saint John (45.2729°N 66.0651°W). The Market Square Exhibition Centre offered three floors and 60,000 square feet (6,000 m^{2}) of exhibition spaces and a wide range of public programs. The Collections Centre, the Archives and Research Library, and the Head Office continued to be situated at the Douglas Avenue location.

In 2017, it was announced by the New Brunswick Liberal government that a new centralized museum facility would be built in uptown Saint John. The new building would have combined the Douglas Avenue and Market Square facilities. In December 2018 a newly-elected provincial government cancelled the project as a cost-cutting measure.

In July 2023, it was announced that a revitalized New Brunswick Museum would be located in its original, 1934 home on Douglas Avenue in Saint John. Officials said they will incorporate a new design with the nearly century-old facility, which will be upgraded and preserved. Diamond Schmitt Architects was awarded the contract to design the new facility.

In December 2023, The New Brunswick Museum announced it had secured a new research and collections centre on Saint John's west side, as it prepared to break ground in 2024 on its estimated $150-million new home on Douglas Avenue.

Construction was set to begin around August 2024, with the project being valued at $130 million.

== Affiliations ==
The museum is affiliated with the Canadian Museums Association, the Canadian Heritage Information Network, and the Virtual Museum of Canada.
