= Domville Building =

Bank in Saint John, New Brunswick

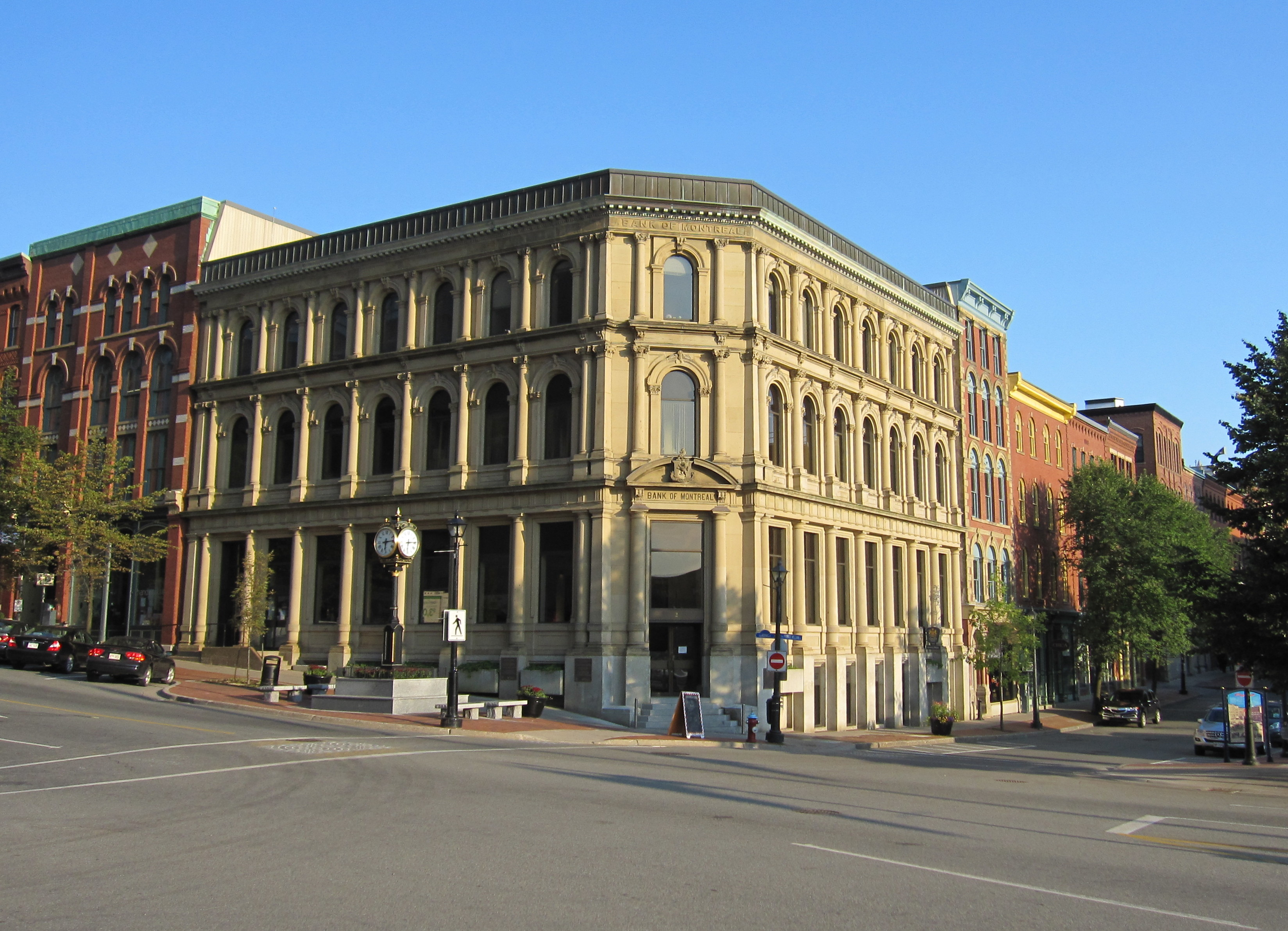
- Interactive map of the Domville Building area

General information
- Status: Bank
- Architectural style: Second Empire
- Location: Saint John, New Brunswick, 2 King Street, Canada
- Coordinates: 45.2727542°N 66.0621923°W
- Current tenants: Bank of Montreal
- Construction started: 1878

Design and construction
- Main contractor: Beatteay & Watters

New Brunswick Heritage Conservation Act
- Type: Municipal Heritage Preservation Act
- Designated: March 18, 1982
- Reference no.: 118

The Domville Building is a historic bank branch in Saint John, New Brunswick. Operated by the Bank of Montreal as one of its current branches, it is located on 2 King Street, at the southeast corner of King and Prince William Streets. Built in 1878 and used by the Bank of Montreal since its completion, it is a Second Empire style structure built using sandstone. The Domville Building is located within the Trinity Royal Heritage Conservation Area.

== History ==
The Domville Building was built in 1878. Named after Canadian Parliament member James Domville, it was one of Saint John's first major commercial buildings following the Great Fire in 1877. On August 5, 1878, the cornerstone for the Domville Building was laid and presented to Domville himself. It was set to be occupied by the Maritime Bank and the Bank of Montreal, but it would also be used as offices for the Canadian Pacific Railway, an insurance office, and as a bar and restaurant. The building has also been used to host political meetings. On March 18, 1982, the Domville Building was recognized as a historic building under New Brunswick's Municipal Heritage Preservation Act, with architecture featuring a Second Empire style built using sandstone. The building continues to be used by the Bank of Montreal as one of its branches.

== See also ==
- List of historic places in Saint John County, New Brunswick
