= Saint John Masonic Temple =

Masonic temple in New Brunswick, Canada

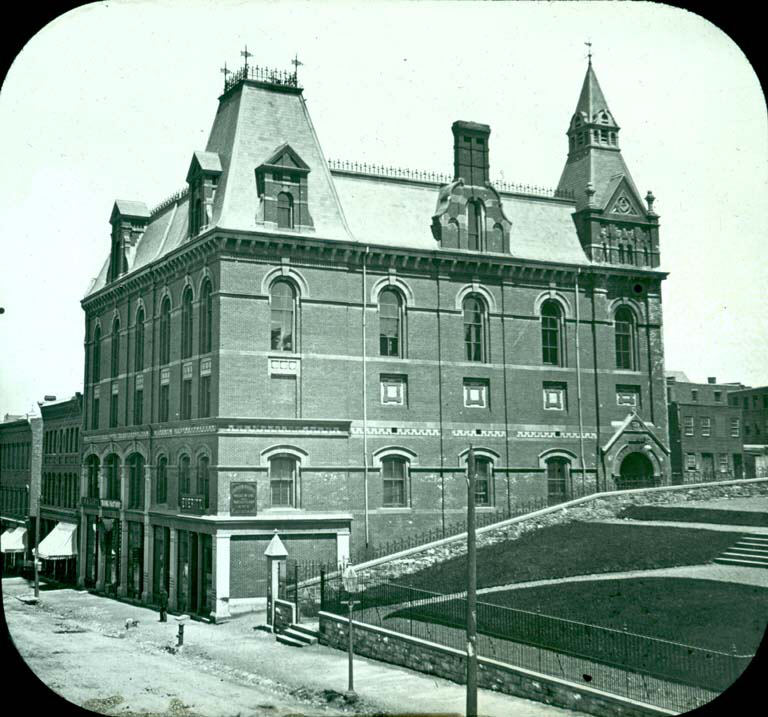
- Saint John Masonic Temple, c. 1900
- Interactive map of the Saint John Masonic Temple area

General information
- Architectural style: Italianate
- Location: Saint John, New Brunswick, 92 Germain Street, Canada
- Coordinates: 45.2724309°N 66.0603445°W
- Construction started: 1877
- Completed: 1881
- Cost: CA$80,000

Technical details
- Floor count: 4

Design and construction
- Architects: McKean & Fairweather
- Main contractor: Alexander Christie & Co. William L. Prince, Esq.

Website
- sjmt.ca

New Brunswick Heritage Conservation Act
- Type: Municipal Heritage Preservation Act
- Designated: March 18, 1982
- Reference no.: 284

The Saint John Masonic Temple is a historic masonic temple in Saint John, New Brunswick, Canada. One of Atlantic Canada's oldest lodges, the masonic temple is located on 92 Germain Street in Uptown Saint John. The brick building features an Italianate architectural style. It is four-storeys tall, with the street floor being used for commercial purposes. It is part of the Grand Lodge of New Brunswick. It is within the boundaries of the Trinity Royal Heritage Conservation Area.

== History ==
The Freemasonry community previously operated a masonic temple in Saint John until its destruction by the Great Fire of Saint John in 1877. Construction on a new masonic temple began following the fire, worked on by architects McKean & Fairweather, and contracted by Alexander Christie & Co. as well as William L. Prince, Esq. The building was completed in 1881, totaling CA$80,000 (equivalent to $3,034,910 in 2025).

Historically, the building was used to host Masonic Grand Lodge of New Brunswick meetings annually, including once in 1934 which included John Babington Macaulay Baxter, a former Premier of New Brunswick who served as the province's Grand Master at the time.

On the morning of January 26, 1929, the masonic temple was destroyed by fire, with damages estimating to be at $100,000 at the time. $55,000 of which was insured. Discussions on rebuilding the temple were made the following month, and efforts to rebuild it began being made starting in late May 1929 until being finished by November 26, 1930. On July 11, 1929, during the rebuilding process, Saint John Masonic Temple, Limited. was established under The Royal Gazette.

== See also ==
- List of historic places in Saint John County, New Brunswick

== Bibliography ==
- Bunting, William Franklin (1895). History of St. John's Lodge, F. & A. M. of Saint John, New Brunswick, Together with Sketches of All Masonic Bodies in New Brunswick, from A. D. 1784 to A. D. 1894. Saint John, N.B.: J. & A. McMillan.
