= New Brunswick Historical Society =

The New Brunswick Historical Society is a historical society based in Saint John, New Brunswick, Canada. Their mandate is specifically the research and documentation of the history of St. John County, New Brunswick and, to a lesser extent, Kings County, New Brunswick, although in the past few years this has extended to the whole province.

The society was founded in 1874, by Joseph Wilson Lawrence, a furniture maker of Saint John. The early society amassed a substantial library of titles and documents important to the province's history; most of it was destroyed in the Great Saint John Fire of 1877. Members of the society have included several published historians, notable public figures, and interested local citizens. The society publishes a quarterly PDF distributed to its membership.

In 1960, the society acquired a property in uptown Saint John known as the Merritt House, which had been occupied by the Merritt family since 1810. Since the acquisition, the house has served as the headquarters of the society, as well as the Loyalist House museum, which attempts to recreate the Georgian-era home of an affluent Loyalist Saint John family.

The society hosts regular events, ranging from brief talks in and around Loyalist House to a comprehensive free series called the Speaker's Talks, held once a month in various locations from October to April. Many of those talks are recorded and posted on its YouTube channel. Its current president is Dr. Greg Marquis, Professor of History, UNB, Saint John.

== See also ==
- Royal Nova Scotia Historical Society
- New Brunswick Genealogical Society
