= Trinity Anglican Church (Saint John, New Brunswick) =

Anglican parish church in Saint John, New Brunswick

- Trinity Anglican Church (Saint John, New Brunswick)
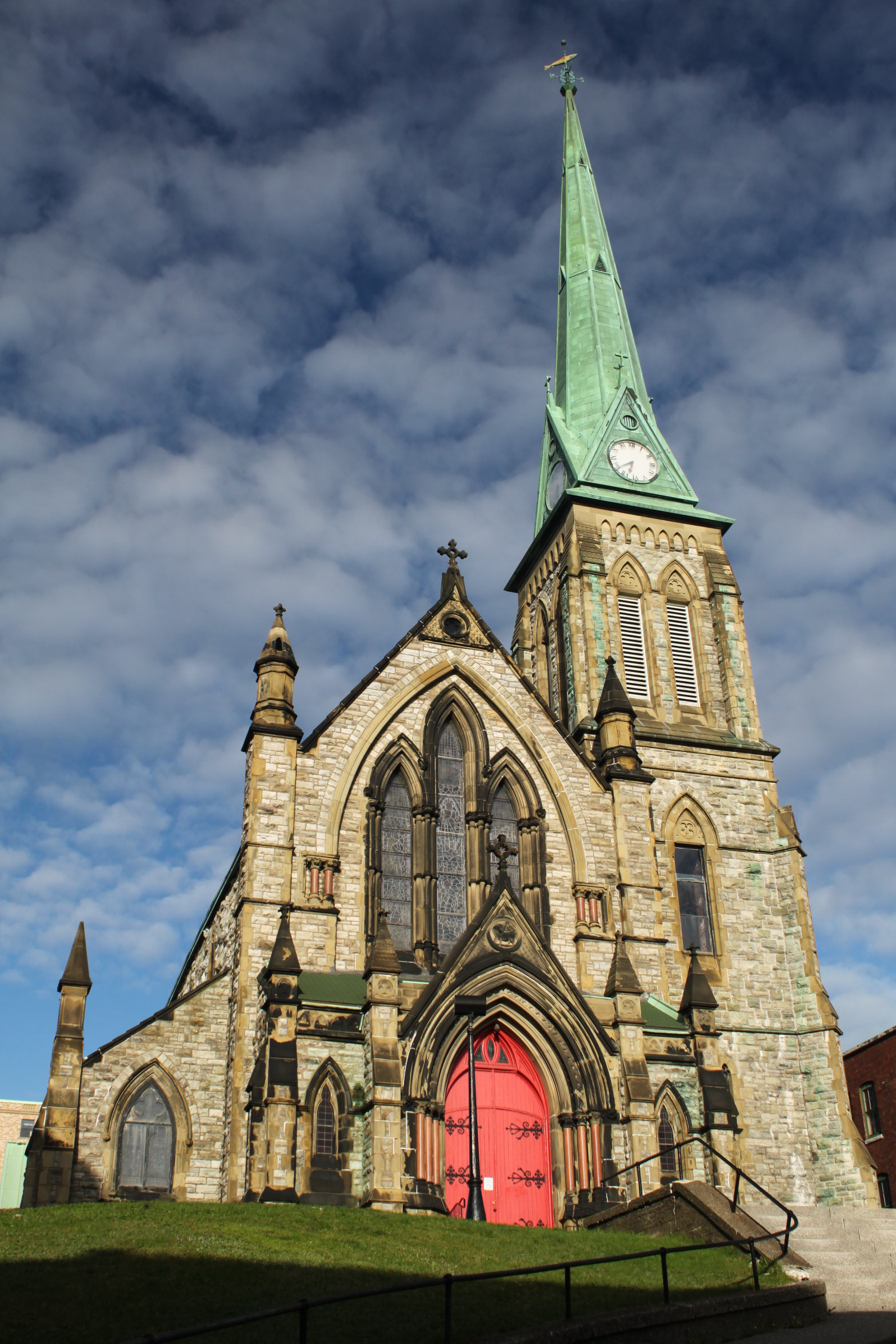
- The church in 2012
- Trinity Anglican Church
- 45°16′20″N 66°03′34″W
- Location: 115 Charlotte Street; Saint John, New Brunswick, Canada
- Denomination: Anglican Church of Canada
- Website: Official website

History
- Founded: 1783
- Dedication: Holy Trinity

Administration
- Province: Canada
- Diocese: Fredericton

Clergy
- Priest: Steven Scribner

Trinity Anglican Church is a parish of the Anglican Church of Canada located in uptown Saint John, New Brunswick at 115 Charlotte Street. The church stands within the Trinity Royal Heritage Conservation Area and is listed on both the provincial and national registers of historic places. The congregation traces its origins to the Loyalist period of the 1780s and was the first established Christian congregation in the city.

An earlier church building completed in 1791 was destroyed in the Great Fire of Saint John in 1877. The stone church was completed in 1880 as part of the city’s post-fire reconstruction.

== History ==
Following the arrival of United Empire Loyalists in 1783, the Anglican congregation initially worshipped in a building that also served as a court and seat of government. A wooden church was soon erected, and by 1791 the parish had moved to the present site. The early church was consecrated by Charles Inglis, the first Anglican bishop in North America.

The original 18th-century structure was destroyed in the Great Fire of Saint John in 1877. Construction of the present church began with the cornerstone laid in May 1879, and the building was opened for worship in 1880. Trinity Church forms part of a concentration of brick and stone buildings erected in Saint John during the late 1870s and early 1880s following the fire. The parish is part of the Anglican Diocese of Fredericton.

== Architecture ==
Trinity Anglican Church is a Gothic Revival stone church with a clock tower and spire. Other elements include pointed-arch windows, pinnacles, a tower clock, and a fish-shaped weather vane surmounting the spire. Interior features include granite pillars, sandstone arches, and a ceiling of black ash constructed by local shipwrights, reflecting Saint John’s shipbuilding traditions.

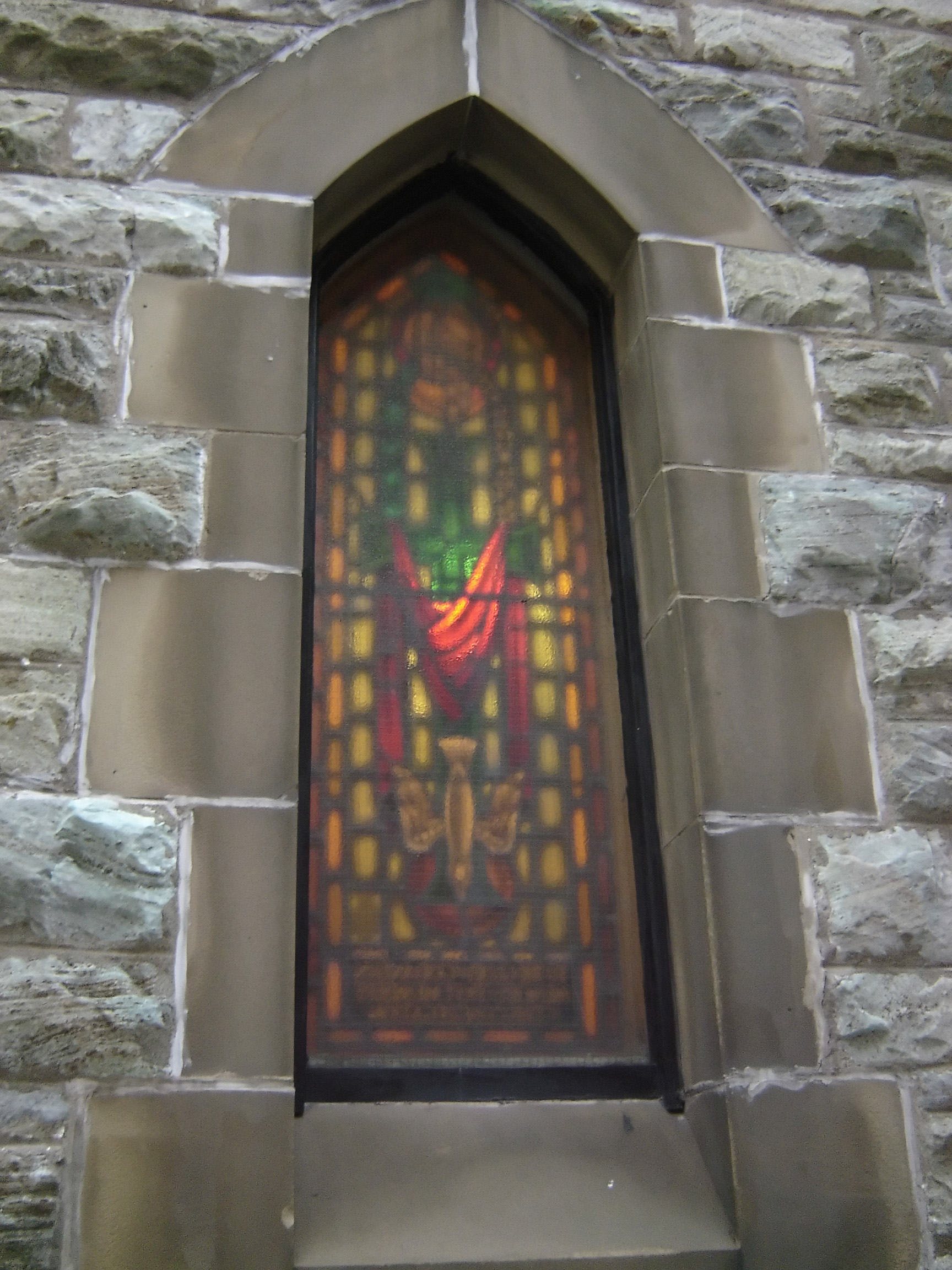
Stained glass

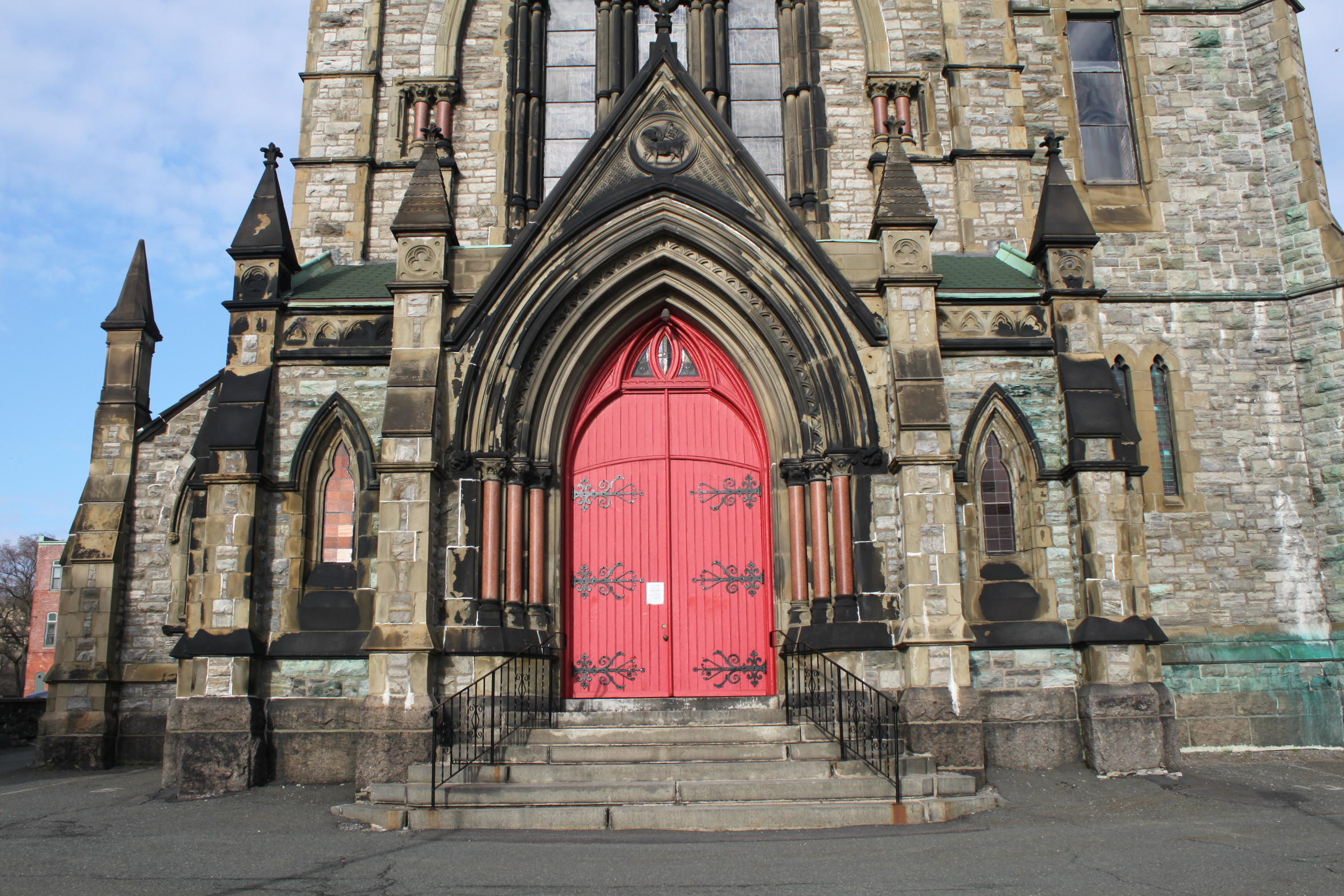
Entrance

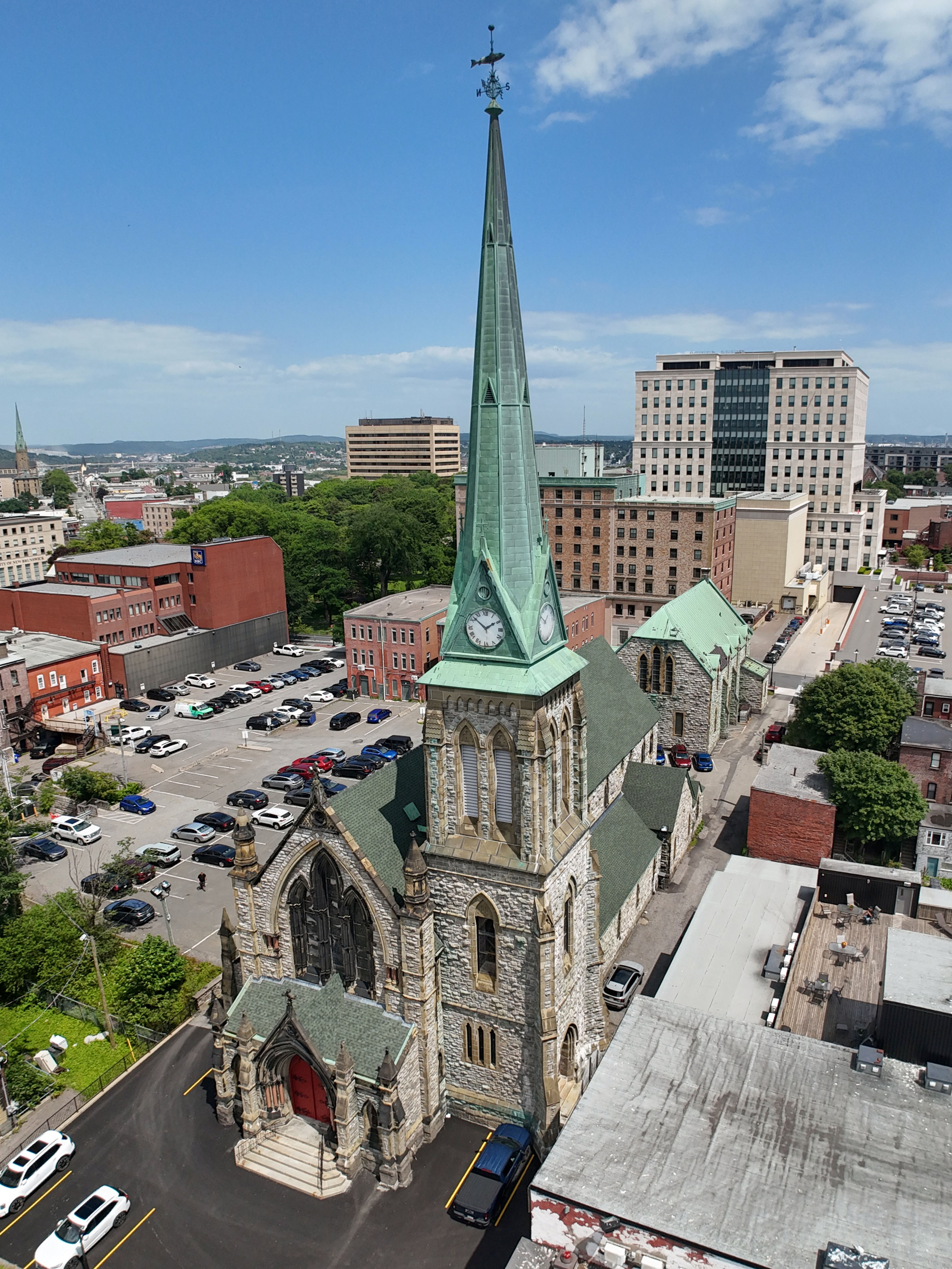
Exterior

== See also ==
- Trinity Royal Heritage Conservation Area
- Anglican Diocese of Fredericton
- Great Fire of Saint John
