= List of historic places in Saint John County, New Brunswick =

This article is a list of historic places in St. John County, New Brunswick entered on the Canadian Register of Historic Places, whether they are federal, provincial, or municipal. While the vast majority of listings are within the city of Saint John, there are a few in outlying rural portions of the county.

== List of historic places ==
Name	Address	Coordinates	Government recognition (CRHP №)	Wikidata ID	Image
ACME Construction Building	45 Canterbury Street; Saint John NB	45°16′18″N 66°03′40″W	Saint John municipality (10741)		Upload Photo
A&I Isaacs Building	80-82-84 Princess Street; Saint John NB	45°16′18″N 66°03′35″W	Saint John municipality (5671)		Upload Photo
Ainsley Apartments	237 Germain Street; Saint John NB	45°16′11″N 66°03′33″W	Saint John municipality (9050)		Upload Photo
Frank D. Alward Residence	125 Mount Pleasant Avenue; Saint John NB	45°17′02″N 66°03′47″W	Saint John municipality (14896)		Upload Photo
American Express Building	20-22 Canterbury Street; Saint John NB	45°16′21″N 66°03′40″W	Saint John municipality (11636)		Upload Photo
Ames-Holden McCready Footwear Company	089 Canterbury Street; Saint John NB	45°16′13″N 66°03′39″W	Saint John municipality (3028)		Upload Photo
Armstrong Building	074 Prince William Street; Saint John NB	45°16′20″N 66°03′43″W	Saint John municipality (1446)		Upload Photo
Armstrong and Bruce Building	167-173 Prince William Street; Saint John NB	45°16′12″N 66°03′42″W	Saint John municipality (9302)		Upload Photo
Armstrong Residence	59 Mecklenburg Street; Saint John NB	45°16′14″N 66°03′13″W	Saint John municipality (13901)		Upload Photo
Alex W. Baird Residence	275 Germain Street; Saint John NB	45°16′06″N 66°03′33″W	Saint John municipality (9137)		Upload Photo
George F. Baird Residence	269-271 Germain Street; Saint John NB	45°16′06″N 66°03′33″W	Saint John municipality (9135)		Upload Photo
Bank of New Brunswick Building	119-125 Prince William Street; 58-60 Water Street; Saint John NB	45°16′16″N 66°03′43″W	Saint John municipality (12142)	Q102215740	More images
Bardsley Building	36-38 King Street; Saint John NB	45°16′22″N 66°03′39″W	Saint John municipality (10738)		Upload Photo
Henry W. Barker Residence	219 Germain Street; Saint John NB	45°16′11″N 66°03′35″W	Saint John municipality (7688)		Upload Photo
James W. Barnes Residence	61-63 Orange Street; Saint John NB	45°16′19″N 66°03′13″W	Saint John municipality (11444)		Upload Photo
Thompson B. Barker Residence	215 Germain Street; Saint John NB	45°16′11″N 66°03′35″W	Saint John municipality (7687)		Upload Photo
Barrack Green Armoury	60 Broadview Avenue; Saint John NB	45°15′58″N 66°03′12″W	Federal (9705)	Q55206252	More images
Barrett Building	116-120 Germain Street; Saint John NB	45°16′19″N 66°03′36″W	Saint John municipality (2939)		Upload Photo
Edward Bates Apartments	82-88 Duke Street; Saint John NB	45°16′13″N 66°03′31″W	Saint John municipality (9185)		Upload Photo
Edward Bates Office	73 Duke Street; Saint John NB	45°16′13″N 66°03′23″W	Saint John municipality (9191)		Upload Photo
William Baxter Residence	135 Leinster Street; Saint John NB	45°16′26″N 66°03′07″W	Saint John municipality (17621)		Upload Photo
Beacon View	156 Sydney Street; Saint John NB	45°16′10″N 66°03′20″W	Saint John municipality (6747)		Upload Photo
Admiral Beatty Hotel	14 King Square South, 60-72 Charlotte Street; Saint John NB	45°16′22″N 66°03′30″W	Saint John municipality (9214)	Q122157285	More images
Thomas Bell Residence	204 Germain Street; Saint John NB	45°16′11″N 66°03′33″W	Saint John municipality (9067)		Upload Photo
T. William Bell Residence	182 Germain Street; Saint John NB	45°16′13″N 66°03′34″W	Saint John municipality (7255)		Upload Photo
Frank Bent Residence	101 Leinster Street; Saint John NB	45°16′25″N 66°03′11″W	Saint John municipality (14575)		Upload Photo
Bentley Street Archaeological Site	Bentley Street; Saint John NB	45°16′08″N 66°04′54″W	New Brunswick (7797)		Upload Photo
Berryman's Hall	131-141 Charlotte Street; Saint John NB	45°16′20″N 66°03′29″W	Saint John municipality (2101)		Upload Photo
Dr. Daniel Berryman's Office and Residence	127 Charlotte Street; Saint John NB	45°16′19″N 66°03′31″W	Saint John municipality (10108)		More images
Bible Society Building	115-117 Germain Street; Saint John NB	45°16′19″N 66°03′37″W	Saint John municipality (2762)		Upload Photo
Griffith Bishop Residence	77 Mecklenburg Street; Saint John NB	45°16′14″N 66°03′10″W	Saint John municipality (13652)		Upload Photo
Colonel Arbuthnot Blaine Residence	74 Duke Street; Saint John NB	45°16′12″N 66°03′32″W	Saint John municipality (9184)		Upload Photo
Robert Blair Residence	57 Orange Street; Saint John NB	45°16′19″N 66°03′14″W	Saint John municipality (11411)		Upload Photo
Frederick W. Blizard Residence	36-38 Orange Street; Saint John NB	45°16′18″N 66°03′18″W	Saint John municipality (11301)		Upload Photo
Blueberry Hill	5100 Westfield Road; Saint John NB	45°17′58″N 66°11′14″W	Saint John municipality (19346)		Upload Photo
Bonnell Dental Infirmary	145 Germain Street; Saint John NB	45°16′17″N 66°03′37″W	Saint John municipality (7522)		Upload Photo
Dr. Bonnell Residence	40-42 Queen Square South; Saint John NB	45°16′07″N 66°03′20″W	Saint John municipality (11189)		Upload Photo
Bostwick Officers' Club	203-205 Germain Street; Saint John NB	45°16′13″N 66°03′35″W	Saint John municipality (7533)		Upload Photo
Bowes Building	21 Canterbury Street; Saint John NB	45°16′20″N 66°03′41″W	Saint John municipality (1508)		Upload Photo
Boyer House	98 Princess Street; Saint John NB	45°16′18″N 66°03′33″W	Saint John municipality (9176)		Upload Photo
Nathaniel Brenan Residence	153 Canterbury Street; Saint John NB	45°16′07″N 66°03′37″W	Saint John municipality (9030)		Upload Photo
James W. Brittain Residence	260 Germain Street; Saint John NB	45°16′05″N 66°03′32″W	Saint John municipality (9145)		Upload Photo
Brodie Building	042 Princess Street; Saint John NB	45°16′16″N 66°03′41″W	Saint John municipality (2832)		Upload Photo
Charles Buchanan Residence	145 Orange Street; Saint John NB	45°16′21″N 66°03′02″W	Saint John municipality (11593)		Upload Photo
Buckley Building	082-086 Germain Street; Saint John NB	45°16′21″N 66°03′38″W	Saint John municipality (2995)		Upload Photo
John F. Bullock Residence	187 Germain Street; Saint John NB	45°16′14″N 66°03′36″W	Saint John municipality (7532)		Upload Photo
Burpee Building	60 Prince William Street; Saint John NB	45°16′21″N 66°03′44″W	Saint John municipality (1509)		Upload Photo
Bustin Building	093-099 Germain Street; Saint John NB	45°16′20″N 66°03′38″W	Saint John municipality (3064)		Upload Photo
Hugh Bustin Residence	18 Horsfield Street; Saint John NB	45°16′16″N 66°03′33″W	Saint John municipality (9177)		Upload Photo
James Byers Residence	11 Gooderich Street; Saint John NB	45°17′02″N 66°03′31″W	Saint John municipality (14746)		Upload Photo
Byron Residence	73-75 Clarendon Street; Saint John NB	45°16′29″N 66°04′47″W	Saint John municipality (11911)		Upload Photo
Cameron/Armstrong Residences	74-76 Queen Street; Saint John NB	45°16′08″N 66°03′28″W	Saint John municipality (10980)		Upload Photo
James Cameron Residence	154 Sydney Street; Saint John NB	45°16′10″N 66°03′20″W	Saint John municipality (11097)		
Carleton House	223 Germain Street; Saint John NB	45°16′11″N 66°03′35″W	Saint John municipality (9042)		Upload Photo
Carleton Martello Tower National Historic Site of Canada	454 Whipple Street; Saint John NB	45°15′08″N 66°04′36″W	Federal (9523, (5477)	Q5052452	More images
146-148 Carmarthen Street	146-148 Carmarthen Street; Saint John NB	45°16′17″N 66°03′16″W	Saint John municipality (14404)		Upload Photo
R. W. Carson Residence	28-30 Bentley Street; Saint John NB	45°16′06″N 66°04′51″W	Saint John municipality (12085)		Upload Photo
Cassidy Residence	160 Queen Street; Saint John NB	45°16′11″N 66°03′09″W	Saint John municipality (12567)		Upload Photo
Cathedral of the Immaculate Conception	91 Waterloo Street; Saint John NB	45°16′42″N 66°03′24″W	New Brunswick (19985), Saint John municipality (14321)	Q5052452	More images
Caverhill Hall	134-136 Sydney Street; Saint John NB	45°16′13″N 66°03′21″W	Saint John municipality (11076)	Q117825635	More images
Arthur S. Chesley Residence	99 Wentworth Street; Saint John NB	45°16′21″N 66°03′12″W	Saint John municipality (13902)		Upload Photo
John Chesley Residence	69 Clarendon Street; Saint John NB	45°16′29″N 66°04′48″W	Saint John municipality (11900)		Upload Photo
W. A. Chesley Residence	226 Douglas Avenue; Saint John NB	45°16′12″N 66°04′52″W	Saint John municipality (12047)		Upload Photo
Chipman Hill Properties	1, 5, 9 Chipman Hill; Saint John NB	45°16′27″N 66°03′47″W	New Brunswick (9377)		More images
Church of Saint Andrew and Saint David	164 Germain Street; Saint John NB	45°16′14″N 66°03′35″W	New Brunswick (1967)		
CIBC Building	44 King Street; Saint John NB	45°16′24″N 66°03′37″W	Saint John municipality (4142)		Upload Photo
Saint John City Market	47 Charlotte Street; Saint John NB	45°16′26″N 66°03′33″W	Federal (7482), New Brunswick (6228)	Q10522183	More images
Charles A. Clark Residence	156 Germain Street; Saint John NB	45°16′15″N 66°03′35″W	Saint John municipality (7572)		Upload Photo
William Walker Clark Residence	19 Horsfield Street; Saint John NB	45°16′16″N 66°03′33″W	Saint John municipality (10914)		Upload Photo
Clarke Residence	173-175 Duke Street; Saint John NB	45°16′16″N 66°03′19″W	Saint John municipality (12527)		Upload Photo
Arthur M. Clarke Residence	8 Duncraggan Court; Saint John NB	45°17′01″N 66°03′54″W	Saint John municipality (15044)		Upload Photo
Clinch Building	16-18 King Street; Saint John NB	45°16′22″N 66°03′42″W	Saint John municipality (1970)		Upload Photo
Commercial Palace	12-14 King Street; Saint John NB	45°16′22″N 66°03′42″W	Saint John municipality (1456)		Upload Photo
Copp Residence	97-99 Orange Street; Saint John NB	45°16′20″N 66°03′07″W	Saint John municipality (10773)		Upload Photo
Corbett Residence	274 Douglas Avenue; Saint John NB	45°16′03″N 66°04′54″W	Saint John municipality (6749)		Upload Photo
Robert Coupe Residence	147 Germain Street; Saint John NB	45°16′17″N 66°03′37″W	Saint John municipality (9296)		Upload Photo
CPR Building	40 King Street; Saint John NB	45°16′23″N 66°03′39″W	Saint John municipality (4141)		Upload Photo
CPR Telegraph Office	102-108 Prince William Street; Saint John NB	45°16′18″N 66°03′42″W	Saint John municipality (12203)		Upload Photo
Lorenzo Crosby Residence	176 Germain Street; Saint John NB	45°16′14″N 66°03′35″W	Saint John municipality (6161)		Upload Photo
William Cross Residence	220 Germain Street; Saint John NB	45°16′09″N 66°03′33″W	Saint John municipality (10793)		
Frances Cruikshank Residence	14 Mecklenburg Street; Saint John NB	45°16′12″N 66°03′19″W	Saint John municipality (13723)		Upload Photo
Robert Cruikshank Residence	27 Queen Square North; Saint John NB	45°16′11″N 66°03′23″W	Saint John municipality (11052)		Upload Photo
George S. Cushing Residence	21-23 Queen Square North; Saint John NB	45°16′11″N 66°03′23″W	Saint John municipality (11039)		Upload Photo
Daley Residence	261-263 Charlotte Street; Saint John NB	45°16′07″N 66°03′25″W	Saint John municipality (11091)		Upload Photo
Sinclair Davis Residence	264 Prince William Street; Saint John NB	45°16′04″N 66°03′38″W	Saint John municipality (7220)		Upload Photo
Dearborn Building	93 Prince William Street; Saint John NB	45°16′18″N 66°03′44″W	Saint John municipality (9305)		Upload Photo
Count DeBury Residence	2-4 Douglas Avenue; Saint John NB	45°16′29″N 66°04′40″W	Saint John municipality (14562)		Upload Photo
J. S. Boies Deveber Residence	105 Wright Street; Saint John NB	45°17′02″N 66°03′26″W	Saint John municipality (14961)		Upload Photo
Senator Dever Residence	5 Chipman Hill; Saint John NB	45°16′27″N 66°03′47″W	Saint John municipality (14825)		Upload Photo
Disbrow Building	72 Prince William Street; Saint John NB	45°16′20″N 66°03′43″W	Saint John municipality (1457)		Upload Photo
Domville Building	2 King Street; Saint John NB	45°16′21″N 66°03′43″W	Saint John municipality (1443)	Q102227909	More images
Louisa Donald Residence	11 Pagan Place; Saint John NB	45°16′05″N 66°03′34″W	Saint John municipality (10899)		Upload Photo
Doody Residence	17-19 Pagan Place; Saint John NB	45°16′05″N 66°03′35″W	Saint John municipality (10903)		Upload Photo
William Duke Complex	29 Harding Street; Saint John NB	45°16′06″N 66°03′28″W	Saint John municipality (10981)		Upload Photo
Eaton Residence	29 Horsfield Street; Saint John NB	45°16′16″N 66°03′32″W	Saint John municipality (9297)		Upload Photo
John F. Edgecomb Residence	12 Duncraggan Court; Saint John NB	45°17′00″N 66°03′57″W	Saint John municipality (15072)		Upload Photo
Col. Matthew Boyde Edwards Residence	31 Queen Square North; Saint John NB	45°16′11″N 66°03′22″W	Saint John municipality (11061)		Upload Photo
Fred P. Elkin Residence	144 Duke Street; Saint John NB	45°16′12″N 66°03′24″W	Saint John municipality (13672)		Upload Photo
Frederick P. Elkin Residence	107 Leinster Street; Saint John NB	45°16′26″N 66°03′09″W	Saint John municipality (14302)		Upload Photo
Ellis Residence	20 Queen Square South; Saint John NB	45°16′07″N 66°03′23″W	Saint John municipality (11170)		Upload Photo
George D. Ellis Residence	80 Orange Street; Saint John NB	45°16′19″N 66°03′11″W	Saint John municipality (11382)		Upload Photo
Engine House No.1	211-213 Charlotte Street; Saint John NB	45°16′12″N 66°03′28″W	Saint John municipality (9267)		Upload Photo
Pascal Emerson Building	056 King Street; Saint John NB	45°16′23″N 66°03′34″W	Saint John municipality (2119)		Upload Photo
R. B. Emerson Residence	190 Germain Street; Saint John NB	45°16′12″N 66°03′34″W	Saint John municipality (9056)		Upload Photo
Ewing Residence	66-68 Queen Street; Saint John NB	45°16′07″N 66°03′30″W	Saint John municipality (10979)		Upload Photo
Finch Residence	249 Douglas Avenue; Saint John NB	45°16′11″N 66°04′54″W	Saint John municipality (12016)		Upload Photo
First Church of Christ, Scientist	263 Germain Street; Saint John NB	45°16′07″N 66°03′33″W	Saint John municipality (9111)		Upload Photo
Emerson Fisher Building	087 Canterbury Street; Saint John NB	45°16′13″N 66°03′39″W	Saint John municipality (3030)		Upload Photo
George Fisher Residence	161 Carmarthen Street; Saint John NB	45°16′12″N 66°03′15″W	Saint John municipality (14415)		Upload Photo
William Shives Fisher Residence	78 Orange Street; Saint John NB	45°16′19″N 66°03′12″W	Saint John municipality (11379)		Upload Photo
Frank Flewwelling House	149 Douglas Avenue; Saint John NB	45°16′20″N 66°04′52″W	Saint John municipality (11931)		Upload Photo
Judge Forbes Residence	47 Duke Street; Saint John NB	45°16′12″N 66°03′36″W	Saint John municipality (10881)		Upload Photo
Fort Charnisay National Historic Site of Canada	Under Route 1 Saint John NB	45°15′53″N 66°04′26″W	Federal (13465)		More images
Fort Howe National Historic Site of Canada	near Main and Metcalf Streets; Saint John NB	45°16′35″N 66°04′22″W	Federal (13001)	Q960026	More images
Fort La Tour National Historic Site of Canada	124 Chesley Drive; Saint John NB	45°16′22″N 66°04′21″W	Federal (17522), New Brunswick (5728)		More images
Foster Residence	8 Queen Street; Saint John NB	45°16′06″N 66°03′38″W	Saint John municipality (10831)		Upload Photo
John Foster Family Grocery	240-246 Prince William Street; Saint John NB	45°16′06″N 66°03′39″W	Saint John municipality (6108)		Upload Photo
Fred Fowler Residence	112 Leinster Street; Saint John NB	45°16′25″N 66°03′09″W	Saint John municipality (14599)		Upload Photo
Foxwell Residence	87 Duke Street; Saint John NB	45°16′13″N 66°03′31″W	Saint John municipality (9194)		Upload Photo
William J. Fraser Building	105-107 Princess Street; Saint John NB	45°16′19″N 66°03′32″W	Saint John municipality (9158)		Upload Photo
Furlong's Liquor Store	001 Princess Street; Saint John NB	45°16′17″N 66°03′44″W	Saint John municipality (2990)		
Thomas Furlong Residence	120 Coburg Street; Saint John NB	45°16′43″N 66°03′31″W	Saint John municipality (14743)		Upload Photo
Daniel J. Gallagher Residence	27-29 Duke Street; Saint John NB	45°16′12″N 66°03′39″W	Saint John municipality (9096)		Upload Photo
Tremain W. Gard Apartments	148-152-154 Germain Street; Saint John NB	45°16′16″N 66°03′35″W	Saint John municipality (7570)		Upload Photo
Gardner Building	66 Prince William Street; Saint John NB	45°16′21″N 66°03′43″W	Saint John municipality (1496)		Upload Photo
General Electric Building	101-107 Germain Street; Saint John NB	45°16′20″N 66°03′37″W	Saint John municipality (4638)		Upload Photo
Germain Street Baptist Church	228 Germain Street; Saint John NB	45°16′08″N 66°03′32″W	Saint John municipality (9094)		Upload Photo
Gillis Residence	43 Duke Street; Saint John NB	45°16′12″N 66°03′37″W	Saint John municipality (6052)		Upload Photo
Gilmour Building	68 King Street; Saint John NB	45°16′23″N 66°03′35″W	Saint John municipality (10746)		Upload Photo
William F. Goddard Residence	155-157 Orange Street; Saint John NB	45°16′22″N 66°03′00″W	Saint John municipality (11617)		Upload Photo
Frank Godsoe Residence	90-92 Leinster Street; Saint John NB	45°16′25″N 66°03′12″W	Saint John municipality (14838)		Upload Photo
Patrick Gorman Residence	149-157 Charlotte Street; Saint John NB	45°16′18″N 66°03′30″W	Saint John municipality (6164)		Upload Photo
Edward F. Greary Residence	84 Sydney Street; Saint John NB	45°16′18″N 66°03′23″W	Saint John municipality (11190)		Upload Photo
Gregory Residence	266 Prince William Street; Saint John NB	45°16′03″N 66°03′38″W	Saint John municipality (7549)		Upload Photo
J. Fraser Gregory Residence	297 Douglas Avenue; Saint John NB	45°16′02″N 66°04′57″W	Saint John municipality (12030)		Upload Photo
Frederick P. Gregory Residence	20 Horsfield Street; Saint John NB	45°16′16″N 66°03′33″W	Saint John municipality (10938)		Upload Photo
Gunter Residence	109 Mount Pleasant Avenue; Saint John NB	45°17′01″N 66°03′48″W	Saint John municipality (14846)		Upload Photo
Ernest Hagerman Residence	26-30 Horsfield Street; Saint John NB	45°16′16″N 66°03′32″W	Saint John municipality (6734)		Upload Photo
Rupert G. Haley Residence	221 Germain Street; Saint John NB	45°16′11″N 66°03′35″W	Saint John municipality (7981)		Upload Photo
Hall & Fairweather Building	105-107 Prince William Street; Saint John NB	45°16′17″N 66°03′43″W	Saint John municipality (9299)		Upload Photo
Thomas H. Hall Residence	54 Orange Street; Saint John NB	45°16′18″N 66°03′15″W	Saint John municipality (11354)		Upload Photo
Hanington and Hanington Law Office	127-129 Prince William Street; Saint John NB	45°16′15″N 66°03′42″W	Saint John municipality (9301)		Upload Photo
Augustus H. Hanington Residence	148 Sydney Street; Saint John NB	45°16′11″N 66°03′20″W	Saint John municipality (11083)		Upload Photo
9 Harding Street	9 Harding Street; Saint John NB	45°16′05″N 66°03′31″W	Saint John municipality (10537)		Upload Photo
Charles E. Harding Residence	21-23 Horsfield Street; Saint John NB	45°16′16″N 66°03′33″W	Saint John municipality (9168)		Upload Photo
John H. Harding Complex	50-52 Queen Street; Saint John NB	45°16′07″N 66°03′32″W	Saint John municipality (10950)		
John H. Harding Residence	242-244 Germain Street; Saint John NB	45°16′07″N 66°03′32″W	Saint John municipality (9143)		Upload Photo
Harkness Residence	227 Duke Street; Saint John NB	45°16′17″N 66°03′11″W	Saint John municipality (12526)		Upload Photo
Samuel Hatfield Building	252-254 Princess Street; Saint John NB	45°16′22″N 66°03′10″W	Saint John municipality (14595)		Upload Photo
Henry Hatheway Residence	134 Orange Street; Saint John NB	45°16′21″N 66°03′03″W	Saint John municipality (11524)		Upload Photo
Walter Hawker Residence	260 Prince William Street; Saint John NB	45°16′04″N 66°03′38″W	Saint John municipality (7535)		Upload Photo
Hayward House	32 Queen Square South; Saint John NB	45°16′07″N 66°03′21″W	Saint John municipality (11187)		Upload Photo
Hayward & Warwick Building	85 Princess Street; Saint John NB	45°16′18″N 66°03′34″W	Saint John municipality (5687)		Upload Photo
Hayward & Warwick Warehouse	91 Princess Street; Saint John NB	45°16′18″N 66°03′34″W	Saint John municipality (5670)		Upload Photo
Hayward's Warehouse	52-54 Canterbury Street; Saint John NB	45°16′19″N 66°03′39″W	Saint John municipality (7246)		Upload Photo
Harvey P. Hayward Residence	268 Princess Street; Saint John NB	45°16′22″N 66°03′08″W	Saint John municipality (13673)		
John Henderson Residence	140 Mecklenburg Street; Saint John NB	45°16′15″N 66°03′00″W	Saint John municipality (14364)		Upload Photo
Joseph Henderson Residence	133 Carmarthen Street; Saint John NB	45°16′15″N 66°03′16″W	Saint John municipality (12765)		Upload Photo
Hilyard Residence	222 Douglas Avenue; Saint John NB	45°16′13″N 66°04′52″W	Saint John municipality (12045)		Upload Photo
HMCS Brunswicker	Barrack Green Armoury site Saint John NB	45°15′54″N 66°03′14″W	Federal (15924)		Upload Photo
HMS Plumper Shipwreck	the seafloor on the coast of the Bay of Fundy between Pt. Lepreau and Dipper Harbour; Musquash NB	45°05′30″N 66°24′46″W	New Brunswick (7796)		Upload Photo
Holder's Sail-Making Shop	100 Water Street; Saint John NB	45°16′12″N 66°03′43″W	Saint John municipality (9588)		Upload Photo
Holman Building	46-52 King Street; Saint John NB	45°16′23″N 66°03′35″W	Saint John municipality (5336)		Upload Photo
Holman Residence	16 Queen Street; Saint John NB	45°16′06″N 66°03′37″W	Saint John municipality (10833)		Upload Photo
Donald MacGregor Hope Residence	6 Duncraggan Court; Saint John NB	45°17′00″N 66°03′53″W	Saint John municipality (14844)		Upload Photo
Hume Hopgood Residence	138 Orange Street; Saint John NB	45°16′21″N 66°03′01″W	Saint John municipality (11542)		Upload Photo
Hunter Building	14-18 Canterbury Street; Saint John NB	45°16′21″N 66°03′40″W	Saint John municipality (5591)		Upload Photo
Daniel Hutchinson Residence	149 Canterbury Street; Saint John NB	45°16′08″N 66°03′37″W	Saint John municipality (7689)		Upload Photo
Imperial Theatre	24 King Square South; Saint John NB	45°16′24″N 66°03′27″W	Federal (4217), Saint John municipality (9293)	Q3527482	More images
Dr. Inches' Office	179 Germain Street; Saint John NB	45°16′15″N 66°03′36″W	Saint John municipality (9298)		Upload Photo
Intercolonial Railway Ticket Office	97 Prince William Street; Saint John NB	45°16′18″N 66°03′44″W	Saint John municipality (9548)		Upload Photo
Isaacs Residence	21 Orange Street; Saint John NB	45°16′18″N 66°03′20″W	Saint John municipality (10737)		Upload Photo
Henry Jack Residence	36 Queen Square South; Saint John NB	45°16′07″N 66°03′21″W	Saint John municipality (10740)		Upload Photo
Jarvis Building	118-120 Prince William Street; Saint John NB	45°16′16″N 66°03′42″W	Saint John municipality (7513)		Upload Photo
Edward L. Jewett Residence	13 Queen Square North; Saint John NB	45°16′11″N 66°03′26″W	Saint John municipality (11036)		Upload Photo
Thomas Johnson Residence	120-122 Orange Street; Saint John NB	45°16′20″N 66°03′05″W	Saint John municipality (11342)		Upload Photo
James Johnston Residence	152 Douglas Avenue; Saint John NB	45°16′20″N 66°04′48″W	Saint John municipality (11943)		Upload Photo
John Johnston Building	101-103 Princess Street; Saint John NB	45°16′19″N 66°03′33″W	Saint John municipality (9156)		Upload Photo
Jones Building	30 Canterbury Street; Saint John NB	45°16′20″N 66°03′40″W	Saint John municipality (6130)		Upload Photo
Everett B. Jones Residence	186 Douglas Avenue; Saint John NB	45°16′17″N 66°04′50″W	Saint John municipality (11953)		Upload Photo
Robert Keltie Jones Residence	12 Mecklenburg Street; Saint John NB	45°16′12″N 66°03′19″W	Saint John municipality (13722)		Upload Photo
Sidney M. Jones Residence	166 Mount Pleasant Ave; Saint John NB	45°17′04″N 66°03′43″W	Saint John municipality (15068)		Upload Photo
Arnold Kee House	204 Pitt Street; Saint John NB	45°16′12″N 66°03′01″W	Saint John municipality (14301)		Upload Photo
George Kincaide Residence	129-131 Leinster Street; Saint John NB	45°16′26″N 66°03′07″W	Saint John municipality (14834)		Upload Photo
58 King Street	58 King Street; Saint John NB	45°16′23″N 66°03′36″W	Saint John municipality (5575)		Upload Photo
Hon. George E. King Residence	66 Orange Street; Saint John NB	45°16′18″N 66°03′13″W	Saint John municipality (11377)		Upload Photo
William Kirk's Boot-making Shop	286-290 Prince William Street; Saint John NB	45°16′02″N 66°03′37″W	Saint John municipality (14561)		Upload Photo
Knodell Building	010 Grannan Lane; Saint John NB	45°16′20″N 66°03′42″W	Saint John municipality (3001)		
Frederick Knodell Residence	156-158 Orange Street; Saint John NB	45°16′21″N 66°03′00″W	Saint John municipality (11559)		Upload Photo
Knowles Residence	112 Orange Street; Saint John NB	45°16′20″N 66°03′06″W	Saint John municipality (11302)		Upload Photo
Knox & Thompson Building	92-94 Princess Street; Saint John NB	45°16′18″N 66°03′33″W	Saint John municipality (9164)		Upload Photo
James Knox Residence	160 Sydney Street; Saint John NB	45°16′09″N 66°03′20″W	Saint John municipality (11267)		Upload Photo
Lawrence Lambert Residence	170 Sydney Street; Saint John NB	45°16′08″N 66°03′19″W	Saint John municipality (9294)		Upload Photo
Fred Langan Residence	27 Horsfield Street; Saint John NB	45°16′16″N 66°03′32″W	Saint John municipality (10915)		Upload Photo
Charles H. Leonard Residence	122 Carmarthen Street; Saint John NB	45°16′19″N 66°03′16″W	Saint John municipality (11404)		Upload Photo
E. Leonard & Sons Building	62 Water Street; Saint John NB	45°16′15″N 66°03′44″W	Saint John municipality (11897)		Upload Photo
Leslie Building	86-88 Prince William Street; Saint John NB	45°16′19″N 66°03′43″W	Saint John municipality (7245)		Upload Photo
Lieberman and Bernstein Residence	67-69 Orange Street; Saint John NB	45°16′20″N 66°03′13″W	Saint John municipality (11447)		Upload Photo
Lindsay & Hegan Residence	267 Charlotte Street; Saint John NB	45°16′06″N 66°03′27″W	Saint John municipality (9272)		Upload Photo
Lingley Printing Establishment	31-33 Canterbury Street; Saint John NB	45°16′19″N 66°03′40″W	Saint John municipality (7587)		Upload Photo
Thomas Linton Residence	25 Gooderich Street; Saint John NB	45°17′03″N 66°03′32″W	Saint John municipality (17622)		Upload Photo
Frederick W. Lobb Residence	159-161 Orange Street; Saint John NB	45°16′22″N 66°02′59″W	Saint John municipality (11635)		Upload Photo
William Albert Lockhart Residence	96 Leinster Street; Saint John NB	45°16′25″N 66°03′11″W	Saint John municipality (12763)		Upload Photo
Lordly Residence	7 Alexandra Street; Saint John NB	45°16′13″N 66°04′48″W	Saint John municipality (12037)		Upload Photo
Loyalist House National Historic Site of Canada	120 Union Street; Saint John NB	45°16′29″N 66°03′40″W	Federal (10691), Saint John municipality (14597)	Q6694458	More images
M R F N Building	011 Canterbury Street; Saint John NB	45°16′21″N 66°03′41″W	Saint John municipality (1497)		Upload Photo
MacDonald Residence	198 Wentworth Street; Saint John NB	45°16′11″N 66°03′07″W	Saint John municipality (13714)		Upload Photo
MacLaren Residence	75 Coburg Street; Saint John NB	45°16′40″N 66°03′33″W	Saint John municipality (14904)		Upload Photo
Magee Apartment Building	109 Germain Street; Saint John NB	45°16′19″N 66°03′37″W	Saint John municipality (5679)		Upload Photo
John Magee Residence	29 Mecklenburg Street; Saint John NB	45°16′13″N 66°03′17″W	Saint John municipality (13733)		Upload Photo
Robert Magee Residence	24 Queen Street; Saint John NB	45°16′06″N 66°03′26″W	Saint John municipality (10842)		Upload Photo
William Magee's Grocery	143-147 Charlotte Street; Saint John NB	45°16′18″N 66°03′31″W	Saint John municipality (9226)		Upload Photo
Magnusson Residence	49-53 Orange Street; Saint John NB	45°16′19″N 66°03′15″W	Saint John municipality (11405)		Upload Photo
Major Building	99-103 Prince William Street; Saint John NB	45°16′17″N 66°03′44″W	Saint John municipality (12093)		Upload Photo
Andrew Malcolm's Warehouse	110-112 Water Street; Saint John NB	45°16′12″N 66°03′42″W	Saint John municipality (6743)		Upload Photo
Dr. James Manning Residence	158 Germain Street; Saint John NB	45°16′15″N 66°03′35″W	Saint John municipality (7573)		Upload Photo
David Mason Residence	130 Orange Street; Saint John NB	45°16′20″N 66°03′03″W	Saint John municipality (11474)		Upload Photo
Masonic Temple	88-96 Germain Street; Saint John NB	45°16′21″N 66°03′37″W	Saint John municipality (6073)		Upload Photo
Henry Maxwell Residence	265 Charlotte Street; Saint John NB	45°16′06″N 66°03′27″W	Saint John municipality (9270)		Upload Photo
McArthur Apartments	197 Germain Street; Saint John NB	45°16′14″N 66°03′33″W	Saint John municipality (6109)		
McAvenney's Dentist Office	169-173 Charlotte Street; Saint John NB	45°16′16″N 66°03′30″W	Saint John municipality (9295)		Upload Photo
John A. McAvity Residence	58 Orange Street; Saint John NB	45°16′18″N 66°03′14″W	Saint John municipality (11374)		Upload Photo
Shillington McCavour Apartments	79-81 Duke Street; Saint John NB	45°16′13″N 66°03′32″W	Saint John municipality (9193)		Upload Photo
McColl Frontenac Service Station	74-76 Princess Street; Saint John NB	45°16′17″N 66°03′35″W	Saint John municipality (7569)		Upload Photo
Bernard McDermott Residence	129 Broad Street; Saint John NB	45°16′03″N 66°03′06″W	Saint John municipality (15070)		Upload Photo
Arthur McDonald Residence	108 Douglas Avenue; Saint John NB	45°16′23″N 66°04′46″W	Saint John municipality (11937)		Upload Photo
McGourty Residence	235 Queen Street; Saint John NB	45°16′13″N 66°02′58″W	Saint John municipality (14305)		Upload Photo
McInerney Residence	55 Mount Pleasant Avenue; Saint John NB	45°16′57″N 66°03′50″W	Saint John municipality (14847)		Upload Photo
McKean Residence	224-226 Princess Street; Saint John NB	45°16′21″N 66°03′15″W	Saint John municipality (13674)		Upload Photo
John S. McLaren Residence	16 Queen Square South; Saint John NB	45°16′06″N 66°03′24″W	Saint John municipality (11105)		Upload Photo
McLaughlin Building	122-130 Germain Street; Saint John NB	45°16′18″N 66°03′36″W	Saint John municipality (7566)		Upload Photo
Daniel J. McLaughlin Residence	271 Charlotte Street; Saint John NB	45°16′06″N 66°03′27″W	Saint John municipality (9292)		Upload Photo
Hon. Hugh McLean Residence	24 Horsfield Street; Saint John NB	45°16′16″N 66°03′33″W	Saint John municipality (9178)		Upload Photo
George McLeod Residence	71 Orange Street; Saint John NB	45°16′20″N 66°03′12″W	Saint John municipality (11463)		Upload Photo
J. & A. McMillan Building	98-100 Prince William Street; Saint John NB	45°16′18″N 66°03′42″W	Saint John municipality (12202)		Upload Photo
John McMillan Residence	206 Germain Street; Saint John NB	45°16′11″N 66°03′33″W	Saint John municipality (9075)		Upload Photo
McPartland Residence	175-181 Prince William Street; Saint John NB	45°16′12″N 66°03′42″W	Saint John municipality (12193)		Upload Photo
McRobbie Residence	6 Queen Square South; Saint John NB	45°16′06″N 66°03′25″W	Saint John municipality (11100)		Upload Photo
Wetmore Merritt Residence	180 Germain Street; Saint John NB	45°16′13″N 66°03′35″W	Saint John municipality (6136)		Upload Photo
Millar Residence	231 Princess Street; Saint John NB	45°16′22″N 66°03′14″W	Saint John municipality (12284)		Upload Photo
Usher H. Miller Residence	25 Alexandra Street; Saint John NB	45°16′13″N 66°04′48″W	Saint John municipality (12039)		Upload Photo
Millican Residence	70 Summer Street; Saint John NB	45°16′57″N 66°03′39″W	Saint John municipality (14942)		Upload Photo
Edward Mooney Property	75 Orange Street; Saint John NB	45°16′20″N 66°03′12″W	Saint John municipality (11450)		Upload Photo
Michael F. Mooney Property	79 Orange Street; Saint John NB	45°16′20″N 66°03′11″W	Saint John municipality (11466)		Upload Photo
Patrick J. Mooney Property	77 Orange Street; Saint John NB	45°16′20″N 66°03′12″W	Saint John municipality (11465)		Upload Photo
John E. Moore Residence	211 Germain Street; Saint John NB	45°16′12″N 66°03′35″W	Saint John municipality (7588)		Upload Photo
Dr. J. H. Morrison Residence	161-163-165 Germain Street; Saint John NB	45°16′16″N 66°03′36″W	Saint John municipality (7531)		Upload Photo
James Morrison Residence	15 Orange Street; Saint John NB	45°16′18″N 66°03′21″W	Saint John municipality (11246)		Upload Photo
Motor Car & Equipment Garage	112 Princess Street; Saint John NB	45°16′18″N 66°03′30″W	Saint John municipality (5466)		Upload Photo
Patrick Mullaly House	56 Clarendon Street; Saint John NB	45°16′28″N 66°04′47″W	Saint John municipality (11912)		Upload Photo
Robert Murray Residence	19 Harding Street; Saint John NB	45°16′06″N 66°03′29″W	Saint John municipality (9211)		Upload Photo
Nelson Residence	60 Pitt Street; Saint John NB	45°16′27″N 66°03′06″W	Saint John municipality (14742)		Upload Photo
Charles T. Nevins Residence	30 Queen Street; Saint John NB	45°16′06″N 66°03′35″W	Saint John municipality (10897)		Upload Photo
Alex Nicholas Residence	146-148 Orange Street; Saint John NB	45°16′21″N 66°03′01″W	Saint John municipality (11555)		Upload Photo
George Nixon Building	84-88 King Street; Saint John NB	45°16′24″N 66°03′34″W	Saint John municipality (10912)		Upload Photo
Number 2 Mechanics' Volunteer Company Engine House National Historic Site of Canada	24 Sydney Street; Saint John NB	45°16′25″N 66°03′25″W	Federal (13472), New Brunswick (6274)		More images
Old Centenary Methodist Church	95 Wentworth Street; Saint John NB	45°16′23″N 66°03′12″W	Saint John municipality (14564)		Upload Photo
Old Dominion Bank Building	76-78 Prince William Street; Saint John NB	45°16′20″N 66°03′43″W	Saint John municipality (12201)		Upload Photo
Old Post Office	115 Prince William Street; Saint John NB	45°16′16″N 66°03′42″W	Saint John municipality (9300)		Upload Photo
Old Provincial Building	55 Canterbury Street; Saint John NB	45°16′18″N 66°03′40″W	Saint John municipality (5669)		Upload Photo
Old City Hall	116 Prince William Street; Saint John NB	45°16′16″N 66°03′42″W	Saint John municipality (10799)		
Olive Residence	138 Princess Street; Saint John NB	45°16′19″N 66°03′27″W	Saint John municipality (14402)		Upload Photo
Orange Hall	119-121 Germain Street; Saint John NB	45°16′18″N 66°03′37″W	Saint John municipality (7514)		Upload Photo
O'Regan's Liquors	107-113 Charlotte Street; Saint John NB	45°16′21″N 66°03′32″W	Saint John municipality (11667)		Upload Photo
Palatine Building	122-124 Prince William Street; Saint John NB	45°16′15″N 66°03′42″W	Saint John municipality (8387)		Upload Photo
Judge Palmer's Residence	29 Queen Square North; Saint John NB	45°16′11″N 66°03′22″W	Saint John municipality (11059)		
Parrtown Place	28-32 King Street; Saint John NB	45°16′22″N 66°03′40″W	Saint John municipality (6121)		Upload Photo
Partridge Island Light Tower	Partridge Island; Saint John County NB	45°14′18″N 66°03′15″W	Federal (13264)		Upload Photo
Partridge Island Quarantine Station National Historic Site of Canada	Partridge Island; Saint John County NB	45°14′13″N 66°03′19″W	Federal (12721)		More images
Sidney Paterson Residence	13 Horsfield Street; Saint John NB	45°16′16″N 66°03′34″W	Saint John municipality (10733)		Upload Photo
Patterson Building	87-91 Germain Street; Saint John NB	45°16′21″N 66°03′38″W	Saint John municipality (7241)		Upload Photo
Hamilton Patterson Residence	137 Duke Street; Saint John NB	45°16′15″N 66°03′24″W	Saint John municipality (13692)		Upload Photo
Paul Residence	136 Orange Street; Saint John NB	45°16′21″N 66°03′02″W	Saint John municipality (11540)		Upload Photo
Harold Perley Residence	8 Pagan Place; Saint John NB	45°16′04″N 66°03′33″W	Saint John municipality (10905)		Upload Photo
Charles Peters Residence	91 Leinster Street; Saint John NB	45°16′25″N 66°03′13″W	Saint John municipality (13675)		
Edwin Peters Residence	188 Germain Street; Saint John NB	45°16′12″N 66°03′34″W	Saint John municipality (6757)		Upload Photo
Frederick A. Peters Residence	200 Germain Street; Saint John NB	45°16′11″N 66°03′33″W	Saint John municipality (9066)		Upload Photo
James Peters Jr. Residence	40 Coburg Street; Saint John NB	45°16′34″N 66°03′34″W	Saint John municipality (14574)		Upload Photo
Rev. Henry Pope Residence	118 Orange Street; Saint John NB	45°16′20″N 66°03′05″W	Saint John municipality (11341)		Upload Photo
Postal Station A	126-40 Prince William Street; Saint John NB	45°16′15″N 66°03′42″W	Federal (7377)		Upload Photo
Postal Station A Annex	65 Canterbury Street; Saint John NB	45°16′12″N 66°03′41″W	Federal (1380)		Upload Photo
Potts Residence	161-163 Charlotte Street; Saint John NB	45°16′17″N 66°03′30″W	Saint John municipality (9227)		Upload Photo
Powers Building	79-81 Princess Street; Saint John NB	45°16′18″N 66°03′35″W	Saint John municipality (6754)		Upload Photo
Capt. Joseph Prichard Residence	84-86 Orange Street; Saint John NB	45°16′19″N 66°03′10″W	Saint John municipality (11285)		Upload Photo
Prince William Streetscape National Historic Site of Canada	Prince William Street; Saint John NB	45°16′03″N 66°03′37″W	Federal (7674)		More images
Puddington Residence	213 Germain Street; Saint John NB	45°16′12″N 66°03′35″W	Saint John municipality (7686)		Upload Photo
Pugsley Building	110-114 Prince William Street; Saint John NB	45°16′17″N 66°03′42″W	Saint John municipality (10524)		Upload Photo
James Pullen's Paint Shop	14-16 Horsfield Street; Saint John NB	45°16′16″N 66°03′34″W	Saint John municipality (10734)		Upload Photo
Queen Hotel	109-113 Princess Street; Saint John NB	45°16′19″N 66°03′32″W	Saint John municipality (9162)		Upload Photo
Frank Rankine Residence	210 Germain Street; Saint John NB	45°16′10″N 66°03′34″W	Saint John municipality (9079)		Upload Photo
Henry Rankine Residence	212 Germain Street; Saint John NB	45°16′10″N 66°03′33″W	Saint John municipality (9084)		Upload Photo
William E. Raymond Residence	157-159 Germain Street; Saint John NB	45°16′16″N 66°03′36″W	Saint John municipality (7524)		Upload Photo
Thomas Regan Residence	10 Orange Street; Saint John NB	45°16′17″N 66°03′21″W	Saint John municipality (11287)		Upload Photo
Catherine Reid's Boarding House	17 Horsfield Street; Saint John NB	45°16′16″N 66°03′33″W	Saint John municipality (9147)		Upload Photo
Detective John Ring Residence	122 Pitt Street; Saint John NB	45°16′20″N 66°03′03″W	Saint John municipality (11469)		Upload Photo
Edward Rising Residence	62 Queen Street; Saint John NB	45°16′07″N 66°03′30″W	Saint John municipality (10977)		Upload Photo
Risk Boarding House	110 Carmarthen Street; Saint John NB	45°16′20″N 66°03′17″W	Saint John municipality (13922)		Upload Photo
Ritchie Building	46 Princess Street; Saint John NB	45°16′16″N 66°03′40″W	Saint John municipality (10830)		
Robert Ritchie Residence	259-261 Germain Street; Saint John NB	45°16′07″N 66°03′33″W	Saint John municipality (9052)		Upload Photo
Riverview Memorial Park	285 Douglas Avenue; Saint John NB	45°16′05″N 66°04′58″W	Saint John municipality (12028)		Upload Photo
George Robertson Residence	216 Germain Street; Saint John NB	45°16′09″N 66°03′33″W	Saint John municipality (9093)		Upload Photo
Struan Robertson Residence	254-256 Germain Street; Saint John NB	45°16′06″N 66°03′32″W	Saint John municipality (9144)		Upload Photo
William F. Robson Residence	96 Sydney Street; Saint John NB	45°16′17″N 66°03′22″W	Saint John municipality (11283)		Upload Photo
Roderick Residence	55 Orange Street; Saint John NB	45°16′19″N 66°03′14″W	Saint John municipality (11409)		Upload Photo
Rodgers Residence	265-267 Germain Street; Saint John NB	45°16′06″N 66°03′33″W	Saint John municipality (9112)		Upload Photo
William P. Rourke Property	151 Orange Street; Saint John NB	45°16′21″N 66°03′01″W	Saint John municipality (11618)		Upload Photo
Royal Bank of Canada Building	22 King Street; Saint John NB	45°16′23″N 66°03′41″W	Saint John municipality (7251)		Upload Photo
Joseph Ruddock Residence	248 Douglas Avenue; Saint John NB	45°16′10″N 66°04′53″W	Saint John municipality (12057)		
Ryan Residence	80 Sydney Street; Saint John NB	45°16′18″N 66°03′23″W	Saint John municipality (12747)		Upload Photo
Saint Andrews Kirk	164 Germain Street; Saint John NB	45°16′14″N 66°03′35″W	Saint John municipality (6094)		More images
Saint John County Court House National Historic Site of Canada	20 Sydney Street; Saint John NB	45°16′29″N 66°03′27″W	Federal (7547)		More images
Saint John Daily News Building	56 Canterbury Street; Saint John NB	45°16′19″N 66°03′39″W	Saint John municipality (10743)		Upload Photo
Saint John Harbour Defensive Network	Perimeter of Saint John Harbour; Saint John NB	45°16′14″N 66°04′11″W	New Brunswick (10054)		Upload Photo
Saint John Municipal Airport, Millidgeville	5 Daniel Street; Saint John NB	45°17′49″N 66°06′08″W	New Brunswick (18081)		Upload Photo
St. John's Anglican Church / Stone Church National Historic Site of Canada	85 Carleton Street; Saint John NB	45°16′33″N 66°03′45″W	Federal (4448)		More images
St. Vincent de Paul Society Building	146 Waterloo Street; Saint John NB	45°16′43″N 66°03′19″W	Saint John municipality (14322)		Upload Photo
Harold Schofield Residence	151 Canterbury Street; Saint John NB	45°16′07″N 66°03′37″W	Saint John municipality (7980)		Upload Photo
John Sealy Residence	104 Leinster Street; Saint John NB	45°16′25″N 66°03′10″W	Saint John municipality (13713)		Upload Photo
Seaman's Mission	154-158 Prince William Street; Saint John NB	45°16′13″N 66°03′41″W	Saint John municipality (7563)		Upload Photo
Shaarei Zedek Synagogue/Calvin Church - Saint John Jewish Community Centre	76 Carleton Street; Saint John NB	45°16′33″N 66°03′42″W	New Brunswick (5907)		Upload Photo
William Shaw Residence	168 Waterloo Street; Saint John NB	45°16′45″N 66°03′18″W	Saint John municipality (14363)		Upload Photo
William Hilyard Shaw Residence	40 Duke Street; Saint John NB	45°16′12″N 66°03′37″W	Saint John municipality (9099)		Upload Photo
Dr. Mason Sheffield's Office	116 Princess Street; Saint John NB	45°16′18″N 66°03′31″W	Saint John municipality (9181)		Upload Photo
Simonds Building	40 Water Street; Saint John NB	45°16′17″N 66°03′44″W	Saint John municipality (10532)		Upload Photo
Smalley's Jewellery	91 Prince William Street; Saint John NB	45°16′18″N 66°03′44″W	Saint John municipality (9303)		Upload Photo
Haley and Smith Residence	50 Orange Street; Saint John NB	45°16′18″N 66°03′16″W	Saint John municipality (11343)		Upload Photo
Frederick G. Spencer Residence	41 Orange Street; Saint John NB	45°16′19″N 66°03′18″W	Saint John municipality (11270)		Upload Photo
Francis Spittel Residence	89 Duke Street; Saint John NB	45°16′13″N 66°03′31″W	Saint John municipality (9195)		Upload Photo
John Sproul Residence	33 Queen Street; Saint John NB	45°16′07″N 66°03′35″W	Saint John municipality (10889)		Upload Photo
James Dewolf Spurr Residence	184 Germain Street; Saint John NB	45°16′13″N 66°03′34″W	Saint John municipality (7265)		Upload Photo
Standard Building	80-82 Prince William Street; Saint John NB	45°16′19″N 66°03′43″W	Saint John municipality (6160)		Upload Photo
Stanley Apartments	20 Queen Street; Saint John NB	45°16′06″N 66°03′37″W	Saint John municipality (10840)		Upload Photo
Samuel Stevens Complex	11-13 Harding Street; Saint John NB	45°16′06″N 66°03′30″W	Saint John municipality (9199)		Upload Photo
Fannie Stewart Residence	172-174 Sydney Street; Saint John NB	45°16′08″N 66°03′19″W	Saint John municipality (11282)		Upload Photo
Stockton Building	92-96 Prince William Street; Saint John NB	45°16′18″N 66°03′42″W	Saint John municipality (9304)		Upload Photo
E. T. Sturdee Residence	186 Germain Street; Saint John NB	45°16′12″N 66°03′34″W	Saint John municipality (9054)		Upload Photo
Joseph Sulis Residence	283-285 Germain Street; Saint John NB	45°16′05″N 66°03′33″W	Saint John municipality (9142)		Upload Photo
Harold Sullivan Residence	160-162 Orange Street; Saint John NB	45°16′21″N 66°02′59″W	Saint John municipality (11560)		Upload Photo
Herman Sullivan Residence	152-154 Orange Street; Saint John NB	45°16′21″N 66°03′00″W	Saint John municipality (11556)		Upload Photo
Sun Building	39 Canterbury Street; Saint John NB	45°16′19″N 66°03′40″W	Saint John municipality (10800)		Upload Photo
Superintendent's Residence	Fundy National Park of Canada; Saint John County NB	45°35′32″N 64°57′05″W	Federal (10055)		Upload Photo
Ada and Mary Tapley Residence	134-136 Pitt Street; Saint John NB	45°16′18″N 66°03′03″W	Saint John municipality (14306)		Upload Photo
Daniel Tapley Residence	233 Douglas Avenue; Saint John NB	45°15′12″N 66°04′54″W	Saint John municipality (12014)		Upload Photo
David Tapley Residence	127 Douglas Avenue; Saint John NB	45°16′22″N 66°04′51″W	Saint John municipality (11928)		Upload Photo
Charles Taylor Residence	8 Queen Square South; Saint John NB	45°16′06″N 66°03′24″W	Saint John municipality (9553)		Upload Photo
Frederick S. Thompson Residence	160 Germain Street; Saint John NB	45°16′15″N 66°03′35″W	Saint John municipality (7575)		Upload Photo
John Thomson Residence	217 Germain Street; Saint John NB	45°16′11″N 66°03′35″W	Saint John municipality (7443)		More images
Robert Thomson Residence	2 Mecklenburg Street; Saint John NB	45°16′12″N 66°03′20″W	Saint John municipality (11082)		Upload Photo
Trinity Anglican Church	115 Charlotte Street; Saint John NB	45°16′20″N 66°03′31″W	Saint John municipality (6135)		More images
Howard Troop Residence	70 Orange Street; Saint John NB	45°16′18″N 66°03′13″W	Saint John municipality (10766)		Upload Photo
Frank Tufts Residence	26-30 Queen Square South; Saint John NB	45°16′07″N 66°03′22″W	Saint John municipality (11186)		Upload Photo
Turner Residence	279 Princess Street; Saint John NB	45°16′23″N 66°03′07″W	Saint John municipality (14308)		
Joshua Turner Residence	277 Princess Street; Saint John NB	45°16′23″N 66°03′08″W	Saint John municipality (14307)		
Union Club	123-125 Germain Street; Saint John NB	45°16′18″N 66°03′37″W	Saint John municipality (7512)		Upload Photo
United Garage	90 Duke Street; Saint John NB	45°16′13″N 66°03′30″W	Saint John municipality (9291)		Upload Photo
Vanwart Brothers Building	201-209 Charlotte Street; Saint John NB	45°16′13″N 66°03′29″W	Saint John municipality (9266)		Upload Photo
Vassie's Corner	20 King Street; Saint John NB	45°16′22″N 66°03′41″W	Saint John municipality (1445)	Q102227960	More images
William Vassie Residence	28 Mecklenburg Street; Saint John NB	45°16′12″N 66°03′17″W	Saint John municipality (13732)		Upload Photo
William Vassie Residence	269 Charlotte Street; Saint John NB	45°16′06″N 66°03′27″W	Saint John municipality (9274)		Upload Photo
Vaughan Residence	41 Duke Street; Saint John NB	45°16′12″N 66°03′37″W	Saint John municipality (5680)		Upload Photo
Walter S. Vaughan Residence	107 Orange Street; Saint John NB	45°16′21″N 66°03′06″W	Saint John municipality (11402)		Upload Photo
Vroom and Arnold Building	160 Prince William Street; Saint John NB	45°16′13″N 66°03′41″W	Saint John municipality (7520)		Upload Photo
Ham S. Wah Chinese Laundry	38 Sydney Street; Saint John NB	45°16′23″N 66°03′24″W	Saint John municipality (13842)		Upload Photo
Walker Building	47-51 Canterbury Street; Saint John NB	45°16′18″N 66°03′40″W	Saint John municipality (10801)		Upload Photo
George Warwick Residence	34 Orange Street; Saint John NB	45°16′18″N 66°03′18″W	Saint John municipality (11299)		Upload Photo
Washington's Restaurant	101-105 Charlotte Street; Saint John NB	45°16′21″N 66°03′32″W	Saint John municipality (10774)		Upload Photo
Waterbury and Jenkins Residence	147-149 Orange Street; Saint John NB	45°16′21″N 66°03′01″W	Saint John municipality (11598)		Upload Photo
Alexander Watson Residence	105 Wentworth Street; Saint John NB	45°16′21″N 66°03′12″W	Saint John municipality (14303)		Upload Photo
Herman F. Weizel Residence	23-25 Orange Street; Saint John NB	45°16′18″N 66°03′19″W	Saint John municipality (11249)		Upload Photo
George Weldon Residence	22 Queen Square South; Saint John NB	45°16′07″N 66°03′23″W	Saint John municipality (11174)		Upload Photo
Wetmore's Drugstore	125-127 Queen Street; Saint John NB	45°16′11″N 66°03′15″W	Saint John municipality (14262)		Upload Photo
Allen Wetmore Residence	175 Canterbury Street; Saint John NB	45°16′05″N 66°03′36″W	Saint John municipality (9041)		Upload Photo
Frank White Residence	262 Prince William Street; Saint John NB	45°16′04″N 66°03′38″W	Saint John municipality (7545)		Upload Photo
Whittaker Residence	150-152 Sydney Street; Saint John NB	45°16′11″N 66°03′20″W	Saint John municipality (11084)		Upload Photo
Thomas P. Williams Residence	9-11 Orange Street; Saint John NB	45°16′18″N 66°03′21″W	Saint John municipality (11212)		Upload Photo
Amon Wilson Residence	27 Queen Street; Saint John NB	45°16′07″N 66°03′35″W	Saint John municipality (10885)		Upload Photo
LeBaron Wilson Building	72-76 Germain Street; Saint John NB	45°16′22″N 66°03′37″W	Saint John municipality (6118)		Upload Photo
Wolastoq National Historic Site of Canada	Entire watershed of Saint John River central and western New Brunswick, parts of southeastern Quebec NB	45°15′38″N 66°05′16″W	Federal (18954)	Q18402136	More images
Woodburn Residence	101-103 Orange Street; Saint John NB	45°16′21″N 66°03′06″W	Saint John municipality (11400)		Upload Photo
John Yeats Residence	9 Chipman Hill; Saint John NB	45°16′26″N 66°03′46″W	Saint John municipality (14744)		Upload Photo

== See also ==
- List of historic places in New Brunswick
- List of National Historic Sites of Canada in New Brunswick
