= Caverhill Hall =

Residence in Saint John, New Brunswick

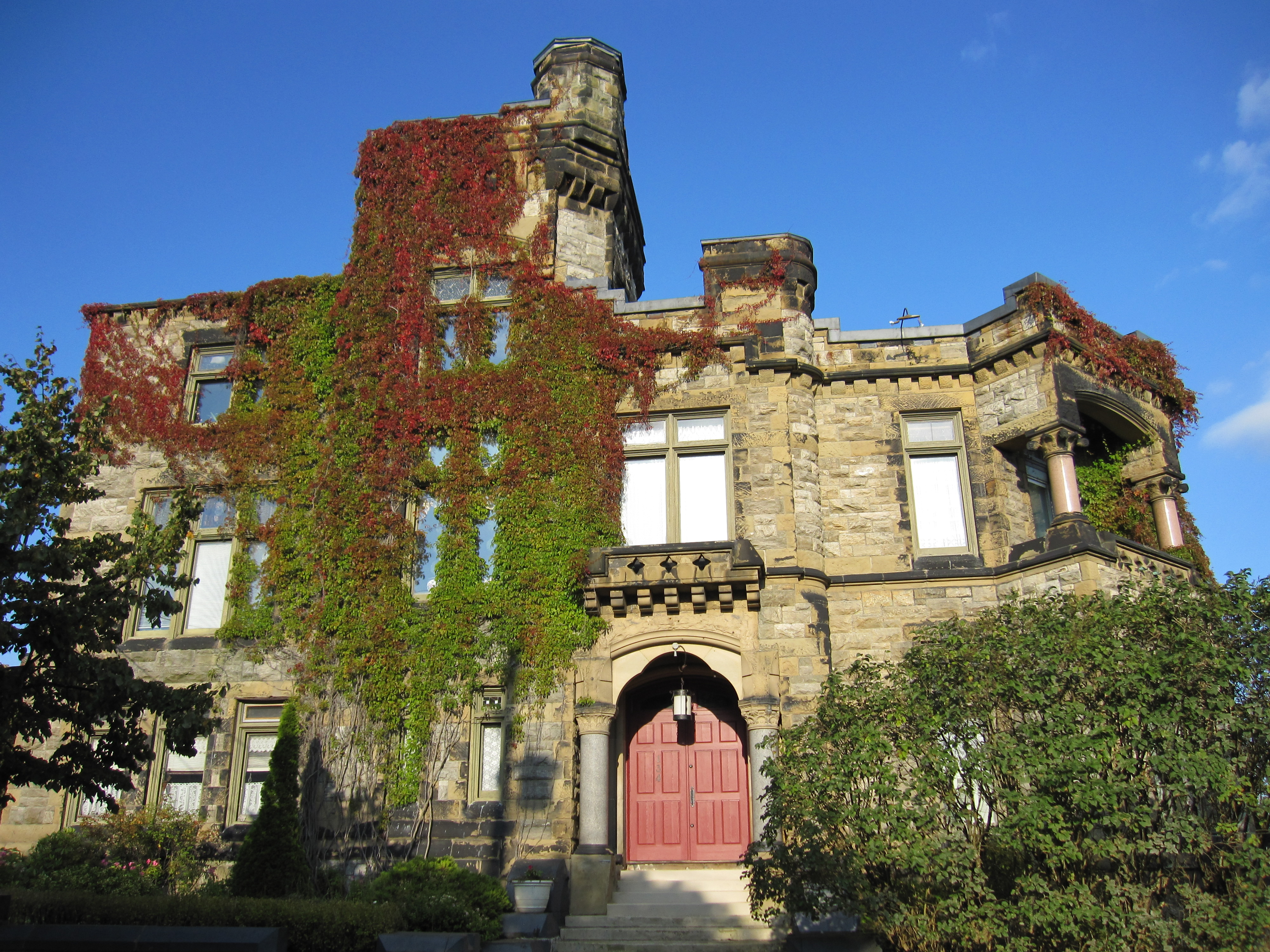
- Caverhill Hall in 2011
- Interactive map of the Caverhill Hall area

General information
- Architectural style: Baronial Style
- Location: Saint John, New Brunswick, 134 Sydney Street, Canada
- Coordinates: 45.2703225°N 66.0557219°W
- Construction started: 1884

Design and construction
- Architect: John J. Brown
- Main contractor: Edward Brass

New Brunswick Heritage Conservation Act
- Type: Municipal Heritage Preservation Act
- Designated: March 18, 1982
- Reference no.: 703

Caverhill Hall is a historic, castle-like residence in Saint John, New Brunswick, Canada. It is located on 134 Sydney Street, at the corner of Sydney and Mecklenburg Streets. Caverhill Hall was built in 1884 for Simeon Jones, the Mayor of Saint John. Caverhill Hall was built using limestone and features a Baronial Style of architecture. It is within the boundaries of the Trinity Royal Heritage Conservation Area.

== History ==
Caverhill Hall was built in 1884 for Simeon Jones, who served as the Mayor of Saint John at the time. It would later be inherited by his son, Robert Keltie Jones, who offered the residence to be used to host George V and Mary of Teck during their 1901 tour, which the government accepted. Caverhill Hall became a soldier's club during the First World War, and was used as a headquarters for Military District No. 7 for a few years thereafter. In late 1922, it was placed under a five-year lease to Saint John, opening as the St. John Health Centre. After World War II, Caverhill Hall was used for over two decades as the Royal Canadian Air Force Social Club, a recreational spot for the Royal Canadian Air Force. It was also used as a nightspot, where it was called the 1880. In 2012, Caverhill Hall was sold for CA$399,900 after being a listed property for five years. The original asking price was about $800,000.

== See also ==
- List of historic places in Saint John County, New Brunswick
