= Barbour's General Store =

Former museum and tourist hub in New Brunswick, Canada (demolished in 2023)

Coordinates: 45.272516°N 66.062542°W

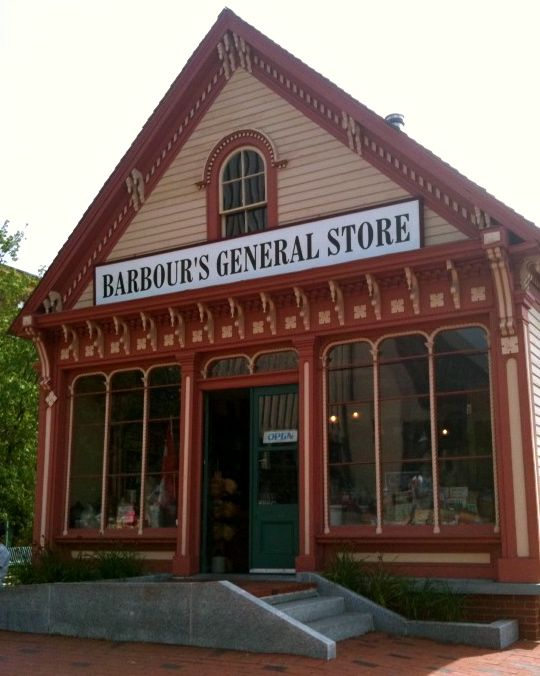
Barbour's General Store Museum in Saint John, New Brunswick.

Barbour's General Store was a museum and tourist hub in Saint John, New Brunswick. It was an authentic 19th-century general store building, preserved and used to recreate a Victorian-era educational experience for visitors. It was located at the intersection of King Street and Prince William Street just outside the Trinity Royal Historic Conservation Area in the city's uptown. On August 22, 2015 the shop was re-opened to the public as a functioning business and local information centre. On June 13, 2023 the building was proposed to demolish after a fire in January 2022. It was dismantled in July 2023.

== History ==
The museum was founded in 1967. The store itself was originally built in the mid-1800s, in Sheffield, New Brunswick. It operated as a general store from the 1860s to the 1940s. The building was relocated to Saint John in the late 1960s, and was towed down the Saint John River. The preservation of the building, and the recreation of the general store with historic artifacts, was funded by the G.E. Barbour Company, for which it is now named.

The idea for the museum came to local businessman Ralph Brenan, who worked for G.E. Barbour. He was dismayed to discover that his granddaughter did not know what coal was, or many other common items from his own childhood. He sought to remedy the lack of awareness of local history for his granddaughter and other children of the area by establishing a museum in the centre of Saint John. On January 25, 2022, the building was severely damaged by a fire. Due to the incident the store closed and later was demolished in June 2023.

== Features ==
The general store was recreated with historic artifacts that would have been seen on the shelves of a local shop of the era. Goods such as clothing, shoes, hats, preserved tobacco, medicines, household items such as tools, lamps, boardgames and irons were on display, as well as local items such as Surprise Soap, made in the nearby town of St. Stephen, and Crosby's Molasses, made in Saint John.

== See also ==
- Saint John, New Brunswick
- Trinity Royal Historic Preservation Area
- List of National Historic Sites of Canada in New Brunswick
