= Loyalist House =

Museum in Saint John, New Brunswick

Coordinates: 45°16′28.65″N 66°3′40.58″W

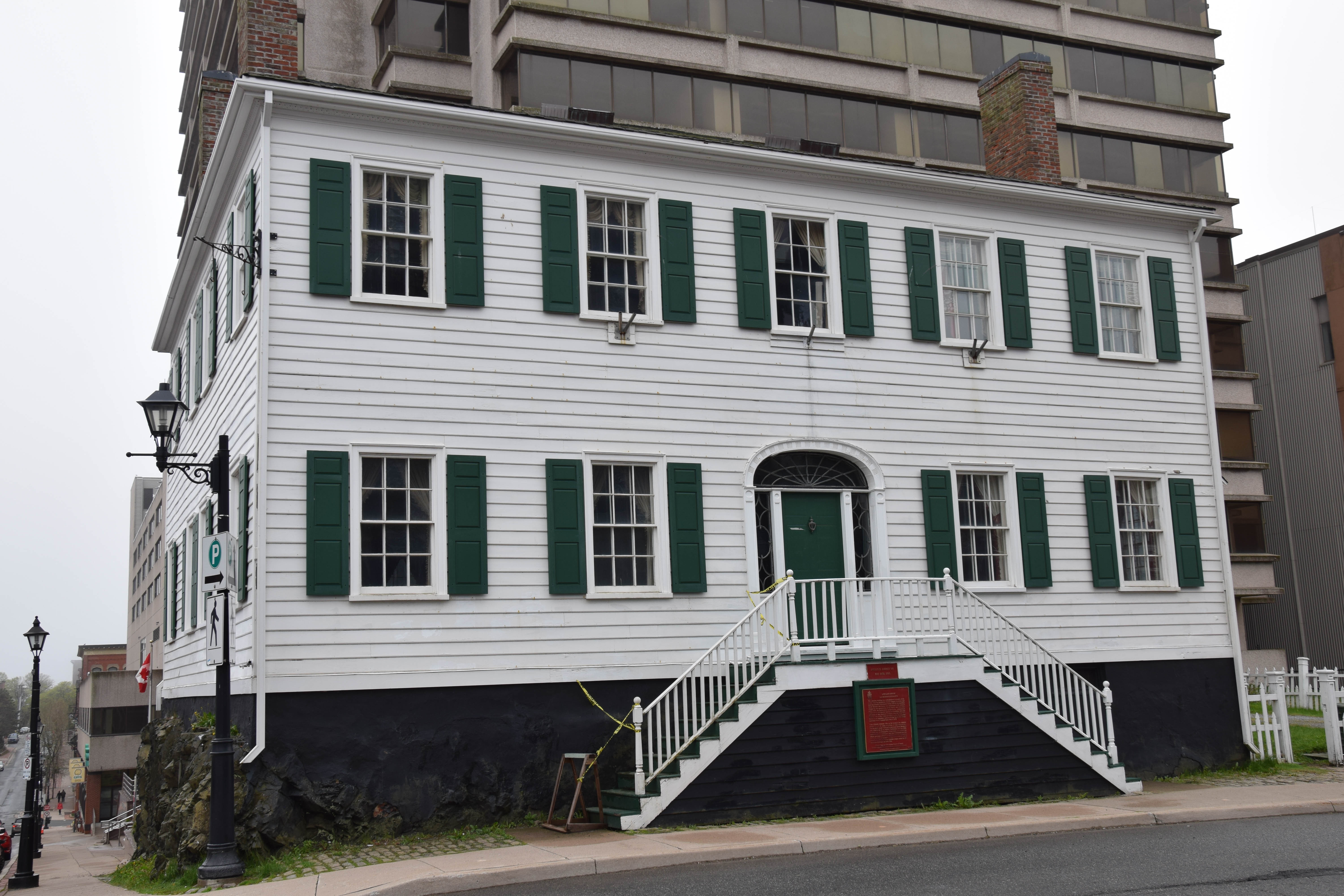
- The facade as seen from the north side of Union Street
- Interactive map of Loyalist House
- Location: New Brunswick, Canada
- Nearest city: Saint John
- Built: 1810-1817
- Original use: Private residence
- Current use: Museum
- Architectural style: Federal Architecture
- Governing body: New Brunswick Historical Society
- Website: https://loyalist-house.nbhs-shnb.ca/

National Historic Site of Canada
- Designated: 1961

Loyalist House is a museum and National Historic Site located in uptown Saint John, New Brunswick, Canada. It was the home of the prosperous Merritt family, who occupied it from its completion in 1817 until 1958. It was taken over by the New Brunswick Historical Society in 1961. Its address is 120 Union Street.

== History ==
The Merritt family were United Empire Loyalists, originally from Rye, New York. In May 1783, along with approximately 6,000 other loyalists, they landed at Parrtown, Nova Scotia (what is now the south end of the City of Saint John in the Province of New Brunswick), having fled the American Revolution. The patriarch of the Saint John Merritts, Thomas Merritt (1729–1821), lived with his wife and seven children in Parrtown. New Brunswick was partitioned from Nova Scotia in 1784, and Parrtown, on the east side of Saint John Harbour, and Carleton, on the west side, were formed into the City in 1785. Despite being initially of "modest circumstances," the family soon became prominent in the city, with the second generation amassing great wealth.

David Daniel Merritt, the third of Thomas' sons and a wealthy shopkeeper, purchased the Loyalist House property, on which construction began in 1810. The house took until 1817 to complete, likely due to the War of 1812. The property was, at that time, just within the city limits, Union street being the city's northern border until 1889. As a consequence, the area surrounding the property was sparsely populated, allowing the Merritts to keep livestock well into the later half of the century. While the house was originally at street level, as the city expanded the streets were dug down to lessen the strain on the draught horses coming up Germain Street. This created the house's elevated look, as seen in the photo above.

The family owned the house until 1961, and lived in it on and off until the death of Louis Merritt Harrison, in 1958. The house was then occupied by Mr. Harrison's housekeeper until the sale of the property to K C Irving and an associate in 1961, at which point the New Brunswick Historical Society opened the house as a museum.

== Architecture ==
Loyalist House is often claimed to be the oldest structurally unaltered building in Saint John; most of its contemporaries having been destroyed in the Great Fire of 1877. The house was built in the New England Federalist style, in keeping with the cultural background of its owners. The structure consists of two-and-a-half storeys, with the western half having been built on a stone and mortar cellar.

The two main floors, which comprised the family living quarters, are identical in layout and almost completely symmetrical. They contained the living and dining rooms, the kitchen, the study, four bedrooms and numerous family and servant halls. The features of the living area include a main and servants' staircase, centralized bell system, four chimneys with two fireplaces each, and thirty one large windows. It was fitted with gas lighting, though the system was later disabled by the family and there is little that remains of it today.

The top floor was used as servants' quarters, containing five rooms. There is speculation that one of these rooms was a servants' dining room and lounge. The adjacent room, which is small and houses numerous shelves, is joined to it by a window as if it were a bar. While this floor features numerous skylights added by the later Merritts, originally it would have had no windows.

Also on the property is a carriage house. Originally double its current length, it housed the Merritt's carriage, sleigh, and livestock. The Loyalists used a heated frying pan to keep them warm in the night.

In 2017, Loyalist House underwent a $600,000 refurbishment.

== Museum ==
The Loyalist House museum comprises most of the two main floors of the house, with other areas used as office space and storage. It is furnished with multiple examples of high-quality Georgian and Victorian furniture, supplied from the collections of the New Brunswick Historical Society, the New Brunswick Museum, and Kings Landing Historical Settlement. It is open during regular business hours from late June until the beginning of September, though it remains open for cruise ships well into autumn, usually until the end of October. The museum is traditionally open for the day on Loyalist Day, May 18. Guided tours of the house are available at all times, with particular emphasis on the Merritt family and the lives of wealthy Saint Johners in the 19th century.

== Affiliations ==
The Loyalist House Museum through the NBHS/ShNB is a member of the Association Heritage New Brunswick/l’ Association Patrimoine Nouveau-Brunswick and in the Saint John/Fundy Zone of the association and affiliated with numerous heritage organizations throughout New Brunswick, as well as the federal and provincial governments.

== See also ==
- Saint John, New Brunswick
- Carleton Martello Tower
- Fort Howe
- The New Brunswick Museum
- Kings Landing Historical Settlement
- United Empire Loyalist
- Loyalist Man
