= Barrack Green Armoury =

Armoury in Saint John, New Brunswick

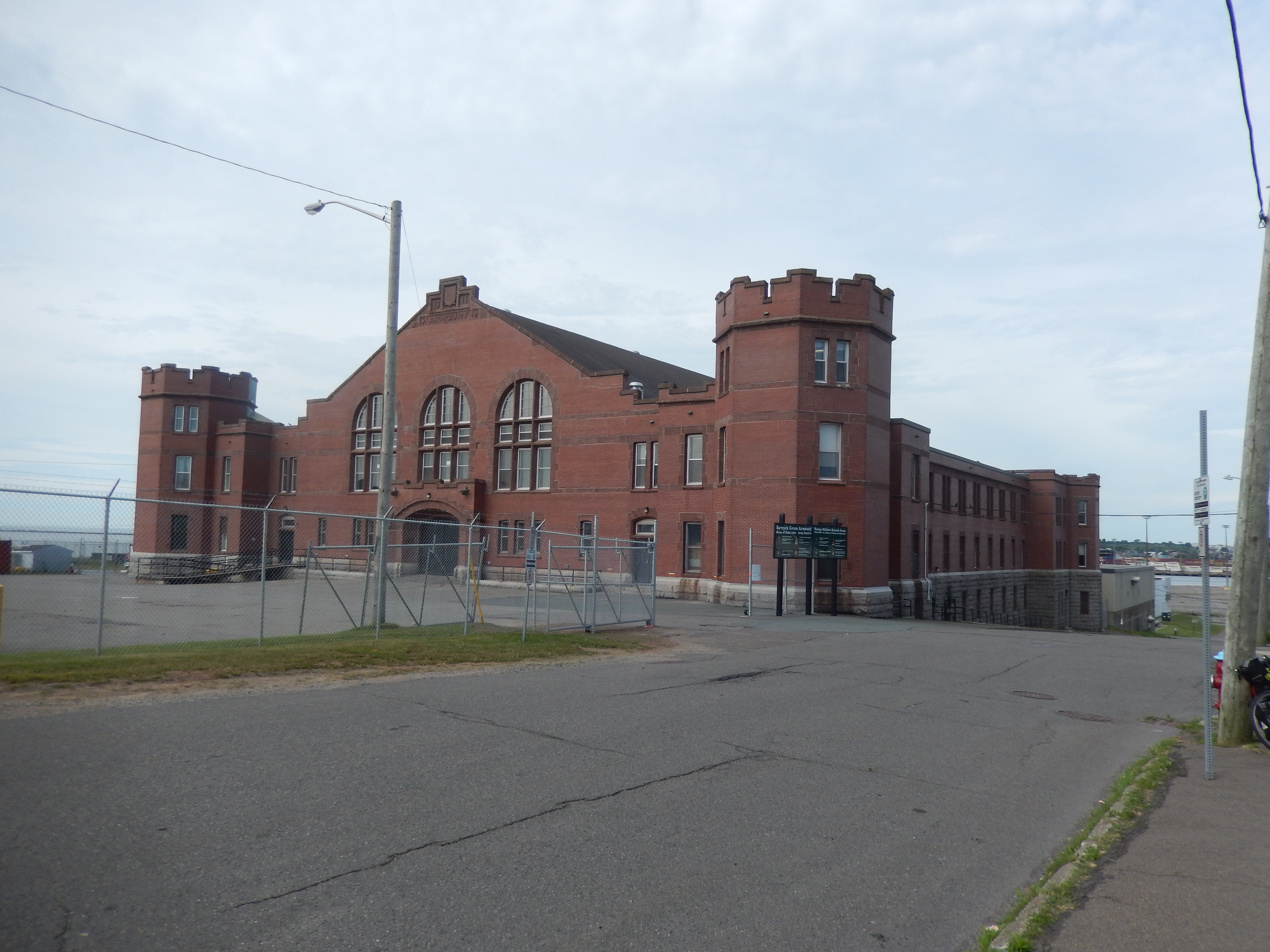
- Barrack Green Armoury in 2016
- Interactive map of the Barrack Green Armoury area

General information
- Location: Saint John, New Brunswick, 60 Broadview Avenue, Canada
- Coordinates: 45°15′57″N 66°3′12″W
- Construction started: 1911
- Completed: 1912

Design and construction
- Architect: David Ewart

Barrack Green Armoury is an historic Canadian armoury in Saint John, New Brunswick. Built between 1911 and 1912, the armoury was recognized as a Federal Heritage Building in 1991. It is used by the 3rd Field Artillery Regiment, RCA, 37 Service Battalion, the 37 Signal Regiment, the 722 Communication Squadron and the Royal New Brunswick Regiment.

== History ==
Designed by architect David Ewart, Barrack Green Armoury was constructed from 1911 to 1912. Sam Hughes, the then-Minister of Militia and Defence, led an enhancement project leading to the armoury's construction.

On May 9, 1991, Barrack Green Armoury was recognized as a Federal Heritage Building. During the 2009 swine flu pandemic, Barrack Green Armoury was used by the Horizon Health Network as a temporary clinic. The armoury has a historic gun, which was dedicated during a ceremony in 2011. In 2018, the armoury received reports of sexual harassment against a reservist who was stationed there from 2014 to 2015.

== See also ==
- List of armouries in Canada
- List of historic places in Saint John County, New Brunswick
