= Loyalist Man =

Coordinates: 45.258425°N 66.088522°W

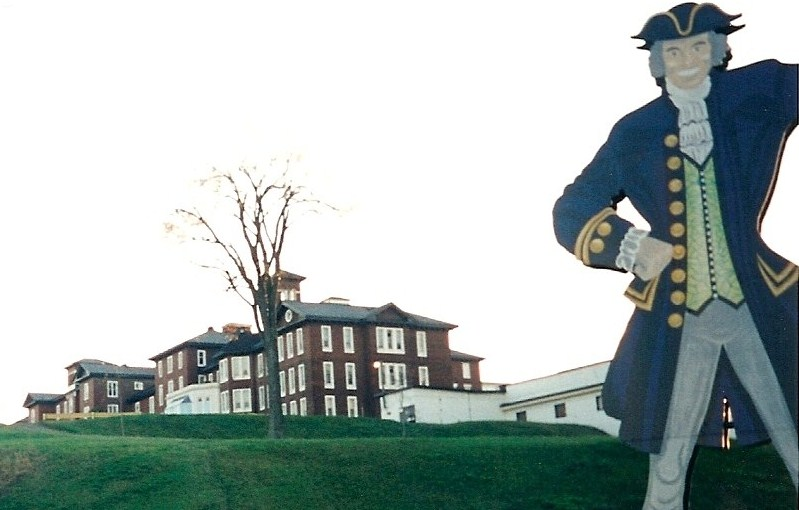
The Loyalist Man in 1999

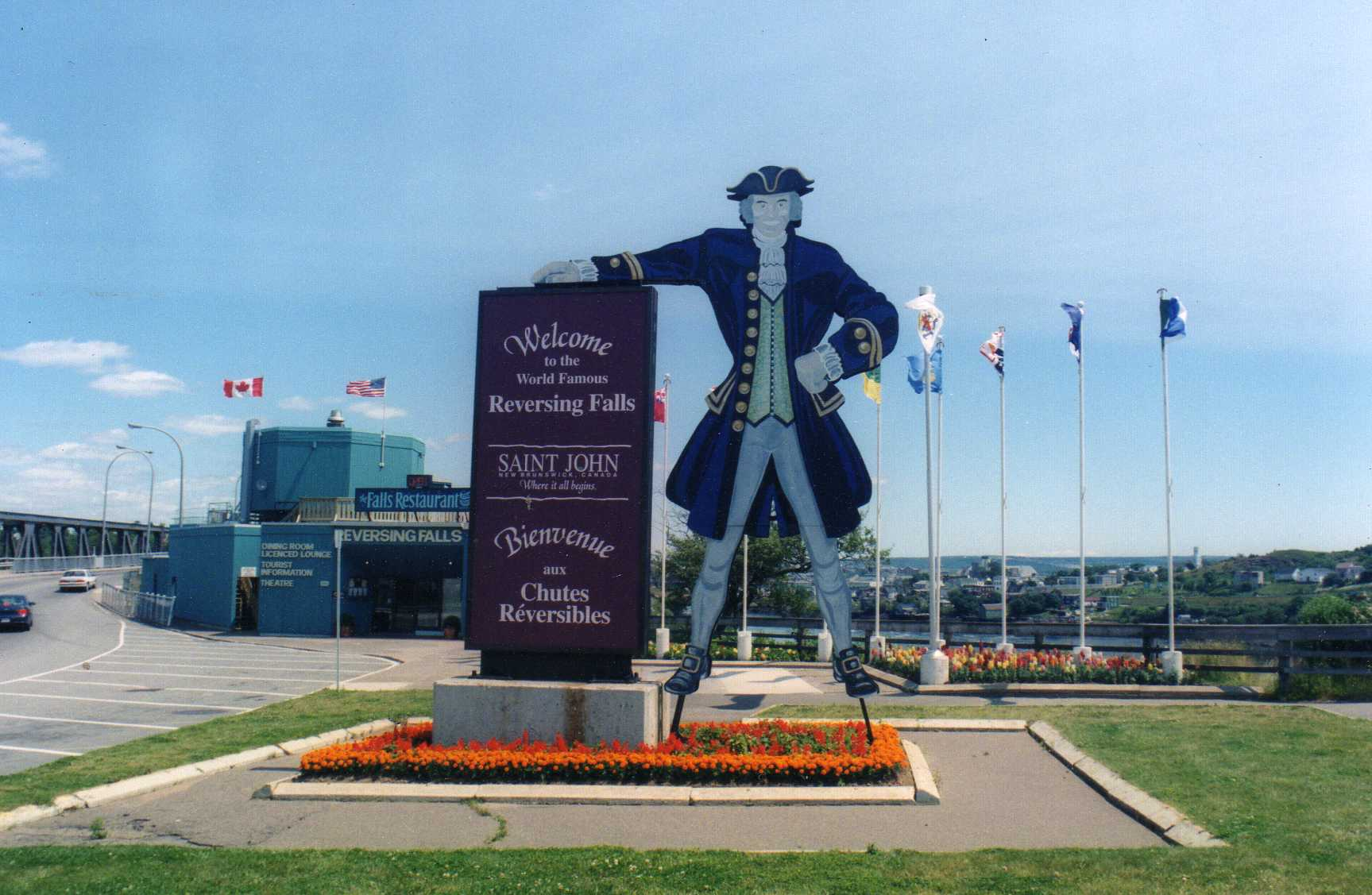
The Loyalist Man in 2002

The Loyalist Man is an iconic sign located near the Reversing Falls in Saint John, New Brunswick, Canada. The figure was conceived of by Jim Stackhouse and painted by Ron Howard. It represents a Loyalist soldier from the American Revolution, as many of Saint John's early settlers were Loyalists. The sign was first displayed in the 1950s though it has been taken out of use on occasion. It was originally created to encourage residents to shop at local stores. In 2005 the city replaced it with a "generic explorer figure" in an attempt to refurbish the city's image but it eventually returned. In 2014 the sign was removed temporarily for repairs after it lost a leg. The City of Saint John has used the image on other signs, pins and various marketing materials over the years. Loyalist Man was also featured as a superheroic character in the Interaction School of Performing Arts' The Saint John History Mystery, as portrayed by Elijah Wilcott.
