= Trinity Royal Heritage Conservation Area =

Coordinates: 45.272°N 66.060°W

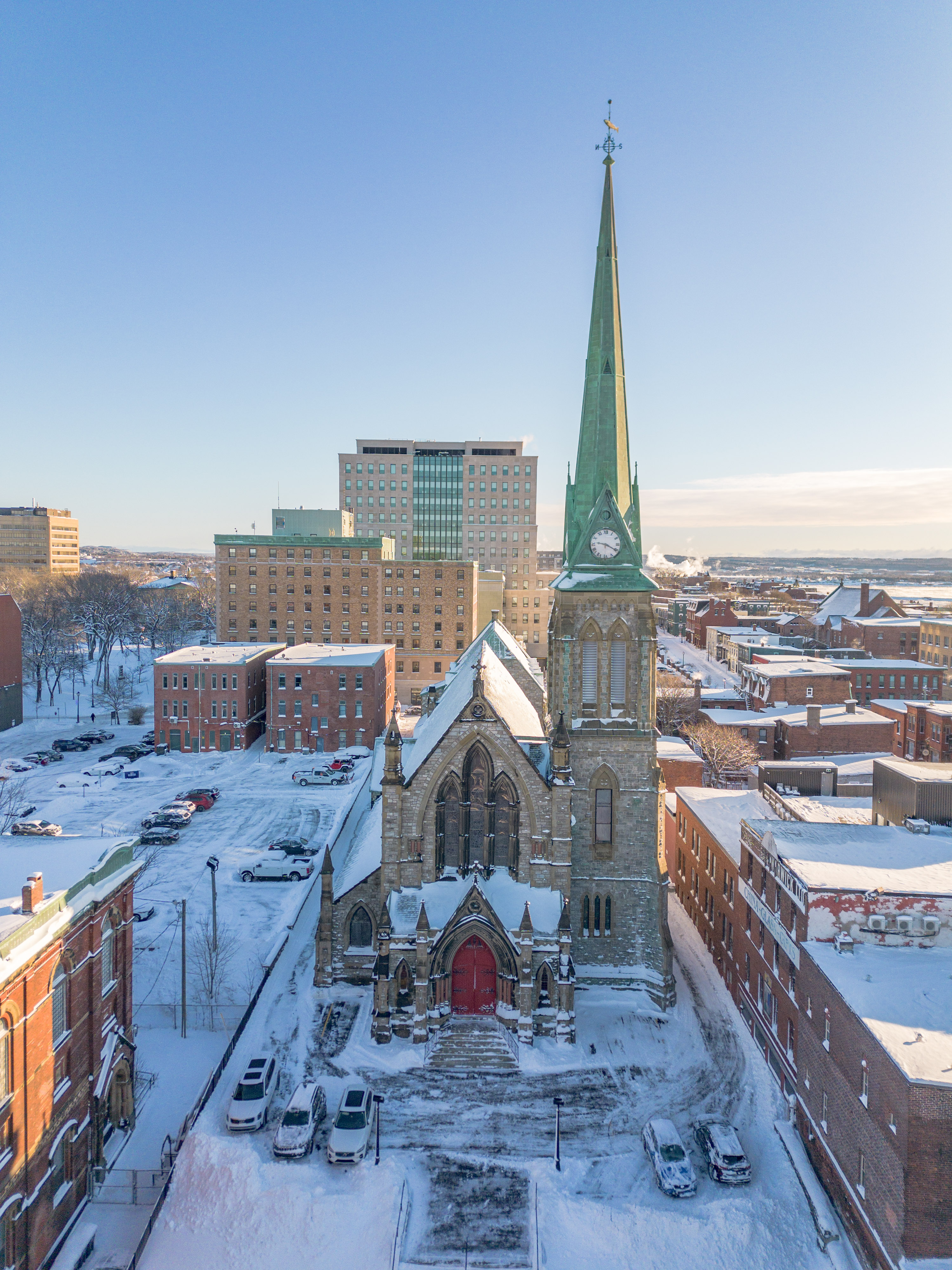
Trinity Anglican Church in 2026

The Trinity Royal Heritage Conservation Area is a historic district in Saint John, New Brunswick's uptown. The City of Saint John designated the area as the city's first heritage conservation area in 1982; it has since expanded in area. Surrounding the Trinity Anglican Church, the area includes several National Historic Sites of Canada within its boundaries. Much of the area consists of Victorian brick buildings raised after The Great Fire of Saint John, New Brunswick that destroyed much of the city's central peninsula in 1877.

== Area ==
The Trinity Royal Heritage Conservation Area has more than a dozen blocks, relatively small, containing late Victorian buildings that house shops, restaurants, pubs, art galleries, other businesses, and private homes.

It is bounded by King Street, Water Street (beside a cruise ship terminal), Queen Street, Charlotte Street, and includes the adjacent Sydney Street. Within these boundaries, it includes the following streets: Prince William, Canterbury, Germain, Queen Square North and Queen Square South, Princess, Duke, Harding, and Horsfield, as well as Grannan Lane.

Although the nearby streets also include a large number of late Victorian buildings, the Trinity Royal area was the focus of conservation efforts as it contains many ornate brick commercial buildings, historic churches, other public buildings such as the Saint John High School, and public green spaces including the Loyalist Burial Ground, Queen's Square and King's Square.

== National Historic Sites of Canada ==
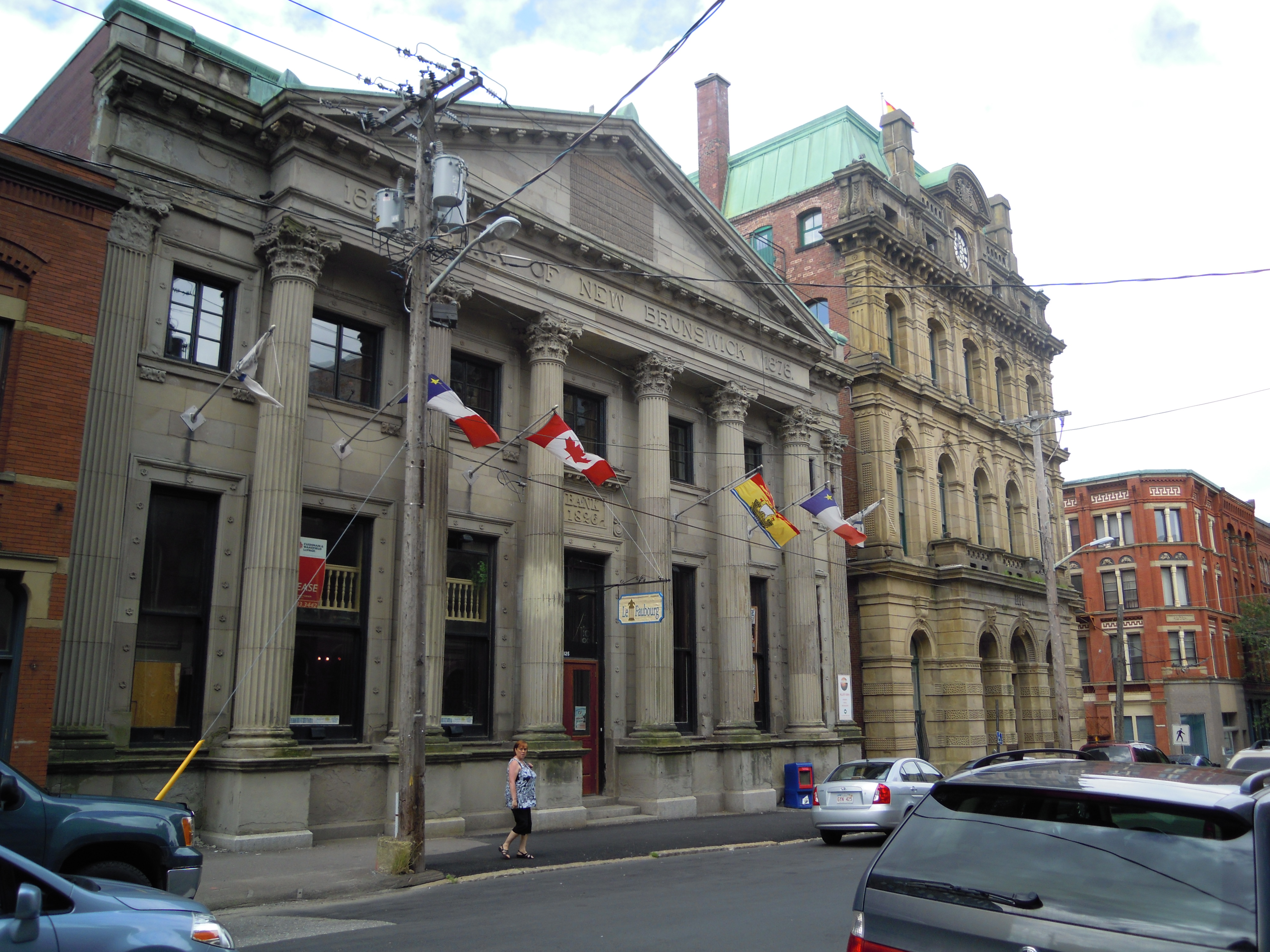
The Bank of New Brunswick building in the Trinity Royal Heritage Conservation Area.

The area includes the following designated National Historic Sites of Canada:

- Bank of New Brunswick Building
- Trinity Anglican Church
- Imperial Theatre
- Saint John County Courthouse
- Number 2 Mechanics' Volunteer Company Engine House
- Prince William Streetscape

Other historic sites not in the Heritage Conservation Area, but within walking distance, are the Saint John City Market, Loyalist House, 1 Chipman Hill, and St. John's Anglican Church / Stone Church.

Also nearby are Saint John City Hall, the New Brunswick Museum, Barbour's General Store, Market Square, and Brunswick Square.

== See also ==
- List of National Historic Sites of Canada in New Brunswick
- Saint John, New Brunswick
