= Great Fire of Saint John =

Urban fire

Coordinates: 45.259°N 66.070°W

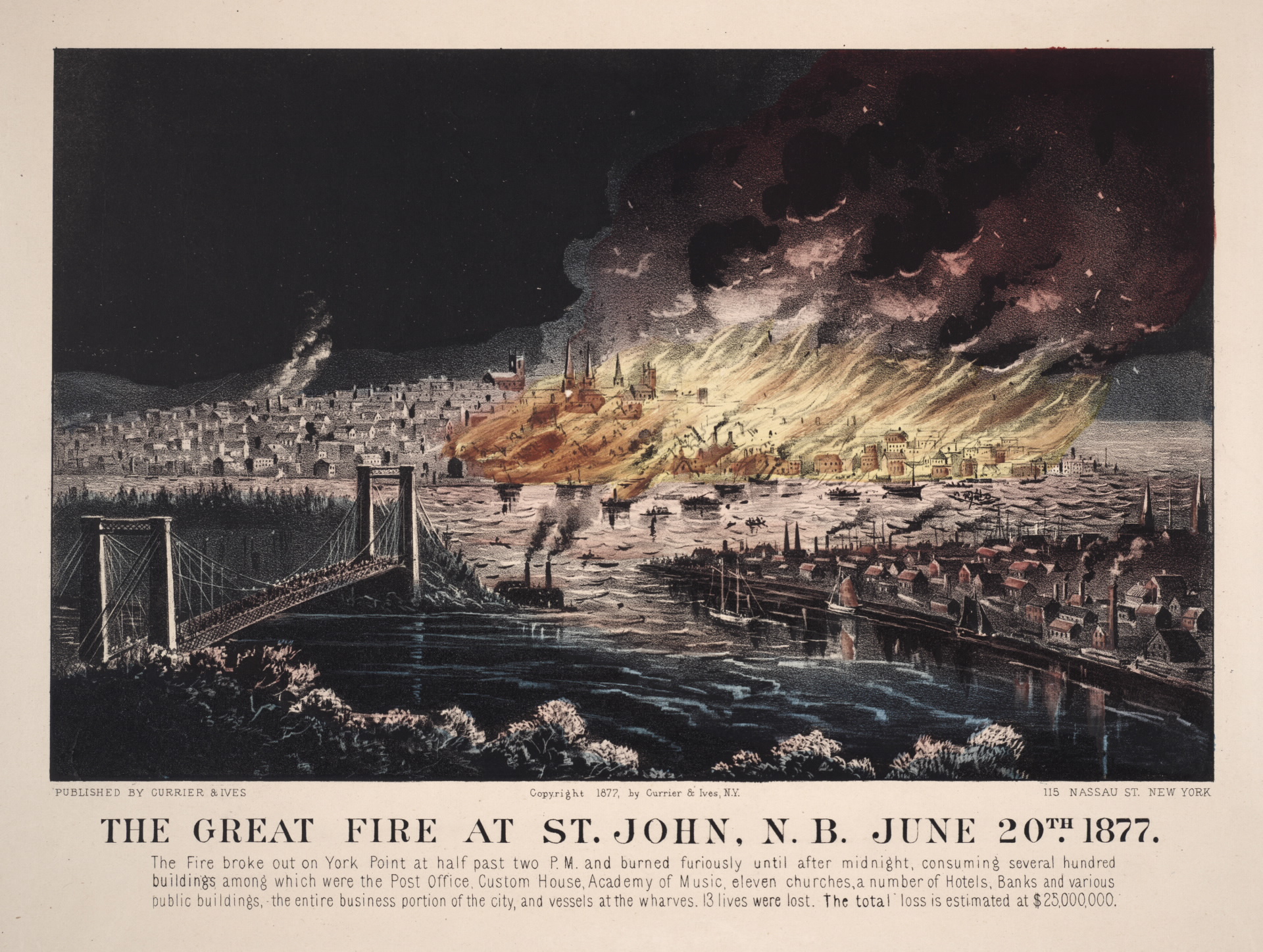
- Date: June 20–22, 1877; 2:30 p.m. (lasted 40~ hours)

Impacts
- Deaths: 18-19
- Structures lost: 1,612 homes
- Cost: $27 million ($868 million in 2025 dollars)

Ignition
- Cause: Loose sparks

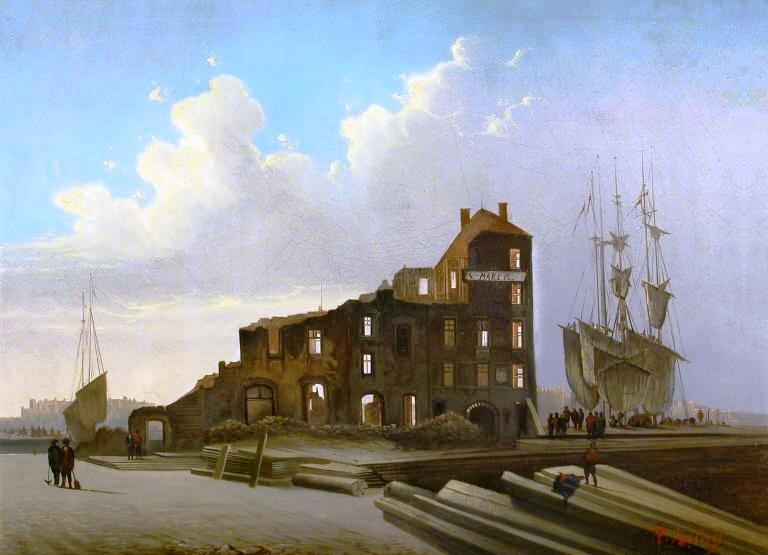
Painting of the fire's aftermath. Aftermath of Fire at Saint John, N.B., 1877, R. Silroy, oil on canvas, 56.5 × 78 cm

The Great Fire of Saint John was an urban fire that devastated much of Saint John, New Brunswick in June 1877, destroying two-fifths of the city. At the time Saint John had a population in the mid-30,000s—up from just over 30,000 in the 1871 census—and was one of the largest cities in the Dominion of Canada.

The city’s dense Victorian era core, composed largely of dense, multi-unit wooden buildings packed closely together, reflected decades of rapid growth but also made it highly vulnerable to fire. When the blaze swept through on June 20, 1877, it destroyed more than 1,600 structures and left about 13,000 people homeless, a devastating impact that underscored both the city’s size and the tightly built character of its urban landscape.

== Fire ==
On June 16, 1877, according to a schoolboy known only as "Harry", an elderly First Nations chief spoke to a number of boys, telling them to warn their parents to move away before Saint John is destroyed on June 19.

At 2:30 in the afternoon of June 20, 1877, a spark fell in Henry Fairweather's storehouse in the York Point Slip area. Nine hours later the fire had destroyed over 80 hectares (200 acres) and 1,612 structures including eight churches, six banks, fourteen hotels, eleven schooners and four wood boats. The fire had killed approximately 19 people, and injured many more people. Approximately 13,000 people were left homeless as a result of the fire. The fire continued to burn for approximately 40 hours. No photographs exist of the fire. However, some survivors' accounts of the blaze tell that the fire came so close to the harbour that it looked like the water was on fire.

== Relief and Recovery ==
Relief efforts began within hours of the fire’s containment, as thousands of residents found themselves without homes, possessions, or access to basic necessities. Temporary shelters were established in public squares, churches, and surviving school buildings, where displaced families received food, clothing, and medical assistance. Municipal authorities, overwhelmed by the scale of the crisis, issued urgent appeals for help to neighbouring communities. Within days, supplies began arriving from towns throughout New Brunswick and Nova Scotia, followed soon by larger aid shipments from central Canada, New England, and the United Kingdom. Donations included tents, blankets, building materials, and funds collected through public subscription campaigns, many of which were organized by civic groups, church societies, and benevolent associations.

The city formed a Relief and Aid Committee to distribute resources and coordinate support for the thousands of homeless residents. One of its early priorities was stabilizing access to food and water, as the destruction of warehouses, bakeries, and municipal infrastructure created immediate shortages. The committee also supervised the establishment of temporary employment programs to help labourers who had lost their workplaces in the fire. These initiatives were supplemented by volunteer efforts, including soup kitchens and clothing drives, which operated throughout the summer of 1877. Although the outpouring of support prevented widespread hunger or disease, conditions in the makeshift camps remained difficult, and the relief system was frequently strained by the sheer volume of need.

Reconstruction began almost immediately, but progressed in stages. Clearing debris from more than 200 acres of destroyed urban terrain occupied municipal crews for weeks, and damaged sections of the water system and telegraph network required urgent repair. In response to both public pressure and practical necessity, the city enacted new building regulations that encouraged or mandated the use of brick and stone in business districts, widened several streets, and introduced requirements intended to reduce future fire risk. These changes, along with the economic stimulus provided by construction contracts, helped accelerate the city’s recovery. Many commercial buildings were rebuilt within a year, while larger civic structures—such as churches, schools, and court facilities—took longer to replace. The reconstruction period left a lasting mark on Saint John’s architectural character, particularly in the areas now designated as part of the Trinity Royal heritage district.

Although the city regained much of its commercial capacity by the early 1880s, the fire had long-term social effects that shaped the community for decades. The displacement of thousands of residents temporarily altered neighbourhood patterns, and some families relocated permanently to suburbs that expanded in the years after the disaster. Insurance disputes, widespread property loss, and the uneven distribution of aid also contributed to economic hardship among working-class families. Nevertheless, the collaborative relief efforts and ambitious rebuilding program came to be viewed by local historians as a defining moment of civic solidarity. The recovery from the Great Fire not only restored Saint John’s economic vitality but also influenced future approaches to urban planning, public safety, and disaster response in the region.

== Aftermath and legacy ==
Saint John's Trinity Royal Heritage Conservation Area was built out of the ashes of the fire.

== See also ==
- History of firefighting
- List of fires in Canada
- List of disasters in Canada
