= List of tallest buildings in Saint John, New Brunswick =

Tall buildings in Saint John, New Brunswick
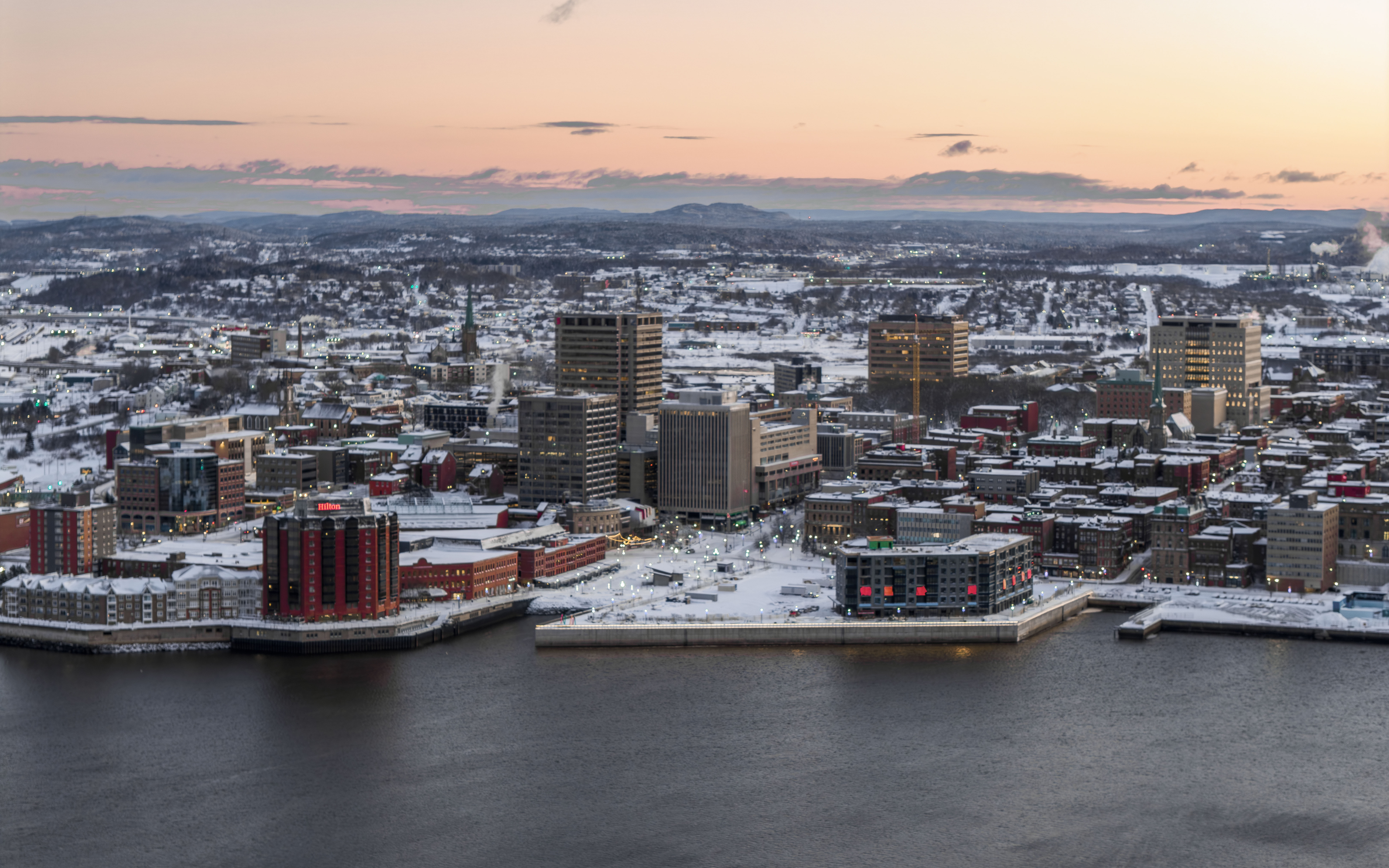
- Aerial view of Saint John in 2026
- Population: Metropolitan Area Population 142k
- Cities included: Saint John, Musquash Grand Bay-Westfield, Rothesay, Quispamsis
- Tallest building: Brunswick Square Office Tower (1976)
- Tallest building height: 80.8 m (265 ft)
- Tallest structure: Coleson Cove FGD Stack
- Tallest structure height: 183 m (600 ft)

Number of tall buildings (2026)
- 10 stories or more: 10
- Taller than 50 m (164 ft): 5
- Taller than 75 m (246 ft): 1

This is a list of the tallest buildings in Saint John, New Brunswick. Saint John is a city on the Fundy coast of New Brunswick and is the first incorporated city in Canada. It is the second largest city in the province of New Brunswick.

As of 2026, Saint John contains 5 buildings that stand taller than 50 m (164 ft) and 14 high-rise buildings that exceed 30 m (98 ft) in height. The tallest building in the city is the 19-storey, 81 m (266 ft) Brunswick Square. This building is tied with Assumption Place in Moncton for the tallest building in New Brunswick. In addition, Brunswick Square is the second largest office building by floor space in all of Atlantic Canada, after the Maritime Centre in Halifax. The second-tallest building in the city is the J.D Irving Building standing at 61 m (200 ft) tall with 12 storeys.

In June 2016, Irving Oil began construction on a new headquarters in Uptown Saint John, next to the imperial theatre. This building is 11 storeys and 59 m (194 ft) in height, making it the city's third tallest building. The tallest building under construction in Saint John is the Fundy Quay Buildings, with four proposed buildings the South-west building was finished in early 2026, the North-Western Building will be 19 floors, the North-East Building is unknown as of 2026 and the South-East Building will also be 6 floors. If constructed, The Fundy Quay Buildings will be the single largest residential construction project ever undertaken in New Brunswick.

A new 11-storey residential high-rise, 99 King, is under construction as of 2026. Upon completion, it would be the first residential high-rise built in the city in over 30 years.

== Tallest buildings ==
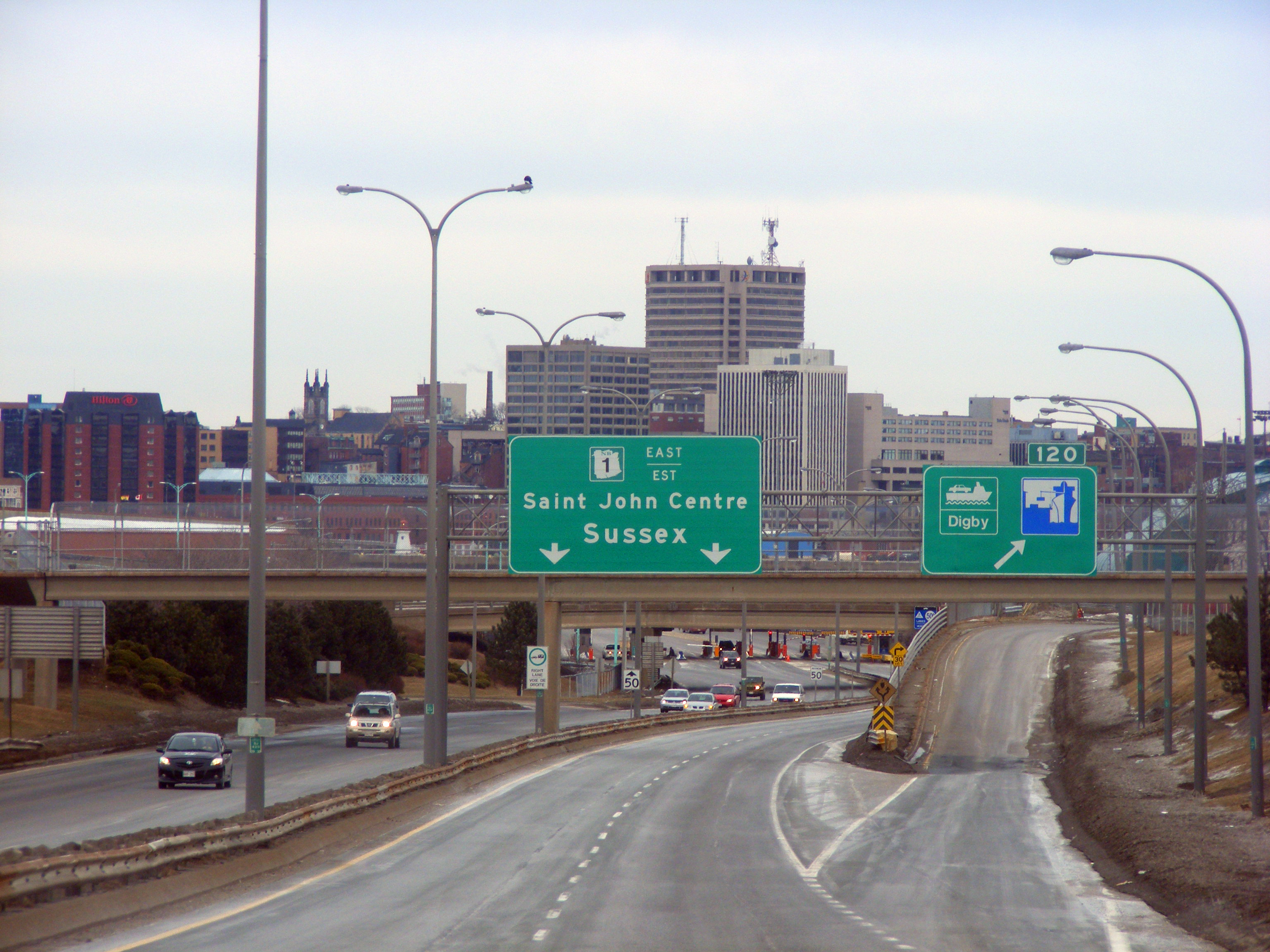
View from New Brunswick Route 1, looking north-east.

This list ranks buildings in Saint John that stand at least 25 metres (82ft) tall, based on CTBUH height measurement standards. This includes spires and architectural details but does not include antenna masts. Some structures are included but for only reference purposes this includes structures like the Coleson Cove Generating Station.

Rank	Building	Image	Height	Floors	Completed	Address	Notes/Type of Building
N.A	Coleson Cove FGD Stack		183 m (600 ft)	N.A	2004	4077 King William Road	Tallest structure in all of Saint John and tallest structure in all of New Brunswick.
N.A	Courtney Bay Smokestacks		106.7 m (350 ft)	N.A	1962	509 Bayside Drive	Second tallest structure in Saint John and third tallest in New Brunswick.
1	Brunswick Square Office Tower		81 m (266 ft)	19	1976	1 Germain Street	Largest office building in New Brunswick by floor space (47,476.4 square metres (511,032 sq ft)), as well as the second largest in Atlantic Canada. Tied with Assumption Place in Moncton for the tallest building in New Brunswick.
2	Cathedral of the Immaculate Conception		70.1 metres (230 ft)	N/A	1855 (1871 Spire)	91 Waterloo Street	Gothic Style Cathedral first mass in Christmas 1855.
N.A	Port of Saint John		69.8 m (229 ft)	N/A	N/A	N/A	
N.A	Irving Paper		65.8 m (216 ft)	N/A	N/A	509 Bayside Drive	
3	Trinity Anglican Church		64 m (210 ft)	N/A	1880	115 Charlotte Street	Gothic Revival Church with 12 bells.
N.A	Irving Pulp and Paper Mill		61.9 m (203 ft)	N/A	1951	408 Mill Road	
4	Irving Building		61 m (200 ft)	12	1981 (Upper 3 Floors 1988)	300 Union Street	Office Building with an estimated workforce of 750 people.
5	Irving Oil Home Office		59 m (194 ft)	11	2019	10 King Sq S	Headquarter building of Irving Oil.
6	Brunswick House		57.9 m (190 ft)	14	1967	44 Chipman Hill	Office building with (9,569 square metres (103,000 sq ft)) of space.
7	99 King Street		55 m (180 ft)	11	2026	99 King Street	Apartment building topped out in 2026 August.
8	Saint John City Hall		54.9 m (180 ft)	15	1970	15 Market Sq	Office building with (15,329 square metres (165,000 sq ft)) of space.
N.A	Irving Oil Refinery		48.6 m (159.4 ft)	N.A	1960	340 Loch Lomond Road	Largest Oil Refinery in all of Canada.
9	Brentwood Tower		47 m (154 ft)	15	1973	310 Woodward Ave	Tallest building in the neighborhood of Millidgeville. The building contains 186 rooms.
10	Saint John Regional Hospital		43 m (141 ft)	6	1982	400 University Ave	Hospital built to replace the old General Hospital.The Chimney stands at 66 m (216 ft)
11	Saint John Harbourfront Hotel		41.5 m (136 ft)	11	1984	75 Smythe Street	Hotel with 192 rooms.
12	Market Square Tower		39.6 m (130 ft)	12	1984	1 Union Street	Apartment Building containing 147 rooms
13	Stephenson Tower		36.3 m (119 ft)	11	1970s	40 Stephenson Tower Dr	Apartment Building containing 100 rooms
14	Stone Church		36 m (118 ft)	N/A	1825	87 Carleton Street	Also known has St John's Church.
15	Admiral Beatty Complex		35.6 m (116 ft)	8	1925	14 King Sq S	Former hotel now called Admiral Beatty Complex.
16	Holy Trinity Church		35 m (114 ft)	N/A	1892	348 Rockland Street	Church
17	Prince Edward Square Apartments		32.3 m (106 ft)	10	1973	20 Prince Edward Street	Apartment Building with 98 rooms
18	Irving Wallboard		32.2 m (106 ft)	N/A	2007	30 Jervis Ln	Warehouse owned by J.D Irving.
19	Brunswick Square Shopping Mall		30.9 m (101.3 ft)	6	1976	39 King Street	Shopping Mall attached to Brunswick Square Office Tower.
20	Mercantile Centre		30 m (98 ft)	7	1992	55 Union Street	Office Building
21	Chateau Saint John		29.8 m (97 ft)	7	2009	369 Rockland Rd	Hotel
22	St. Joseph's Hospital		29.4 m (97 ft)	8	1914	130 Bayard Dr	First Hospital built in Saint John.
23	Fort Howe Hotel & Convention Centre		29.3 m (96 ft)	9	1970	55 Magazine Street	Apartment Building with 153 rooms
24	Postal Station A		29.2 m (95 ft)	6	1904	2 Princess Street	Government Building
25	Harbourfront Residences at Three Sisters		29.1 m (95 ft)	8	2012	230 Water Street	Apartment Complex
26	Brunswick Drive Apartments		29 m (95 ft)	9	1970s	656 Brunswick Dr	Apartment Building
27	Harbour Building		28.7 m (94 ft)	8	1881	133 Prince William Street	Office Building
28	Customs House		28.3 m (92.8 ft)	7	1880s	189 Prince William Street	Government Building
29	Crowne Plaza Saint John		28.1 m (92.2 ft)	8	1983	10 Portland Street	Hotel
30	St. Luke's Anglican Church		27.5 m (90 ft)	N/A	1880	369 Main Street	Wooden Gothic Revival
31	Peel Plaza Parking Garage		27.2 m (89.2 ft)	N/A	2009	75 Carleton Street	Parking Garage
32	Church of St. John Baptist & St. Clement		27.1 m (88.9 ft)	N/A	1861	162 Waterloo Street	Church
33	Westmorland Grove Apartments		27 m (88 ft)	9	1970s	155 Mystery Lake Rd	Apartment Building
34	Harbour Bridge		26.6 m (87 ft)	N/A	1968	N/A	Bridge
35	Holiday Inn Express Saint John Harbour Side		25.6 m (83 ft)	8	1979	400 Main Street	Hotel
36	Harbour Station		25 m (82 ft)	2	1993	99 Station Street	Sports center with 8100 seats.
37	The Wentworth		25 m (82 ft)	7	2021	95 Wentworth Street	Apartment Building

== Tallest Structures in Saint John ==
Tallest Structures in Saint John.
Rank	Building	Image	Height	Floors	Completion	Notes	Ref
1	Coleson Cove FGD Stack		183 m (600 ft)	N/A	2004	Tallest Structure in Saint John.	
2	Courtney Bay Smoke Stakes		106.7 m (350 ft)	N/A	1962		
3	Port of Saint John		69.8 m (229 ft)	N/A	N/A		
4	Irving Paper		65.8 m (216 ft)	N/A	N/A		
5	Irving Pulp And Paper Mill		61.9 m (203 ft)	N/A	1951		
6	Irving Oil Refinery		Up to 48.6 m (159.4 ft)	N/A	1960		

== List of tallest buildings under construction and proposed in Saint John ==
Rank	Building Name	Images	Height	Floors	Construction Started	Status	Type of Building	Notes	Ref
1	Fundy Quay NE		70 m (230 ft)	19	2023	Under Construction	Office/residential mix	When completed this building will be the largest residential building in Saint John.	
2=	Fundy Quay SE		60 m (197 ft)	16	N/A	Under Construction	Office/residential mix	The second building of the Fundy Quay complex.	
2=	Fundy Quay NW		60 m (197 ft)	16	N/A	Under Construction	Office/residential mix	The third building of the Fundy Quay complex.	
4	300 Sydney Street		33–38 m (108–125 ft)	11	N.A	Proposed	Apartment building	Unknown height if constructed it will be tallest south of the Irving Oil Home Office.	

== List of Tallest Buildings for their time (Not including churches) ==
Years It Was Tallest	Building Name	Images	Height	Floor Count	Type of Building
1881-1925	Harbour Building		28.7 m (94 ft)	8	Office Building
1925-1967	Admiral Beatty Hotel		35.6 m (116 ft)	8	Former Hotel
1967-1976	Brunswick House		57.9 m (190 ft)	14	Office Building
1976–Present	Brunswick Square Office Tower		80.8 m (265 ft)	19	Office Building

== Other important structures ==
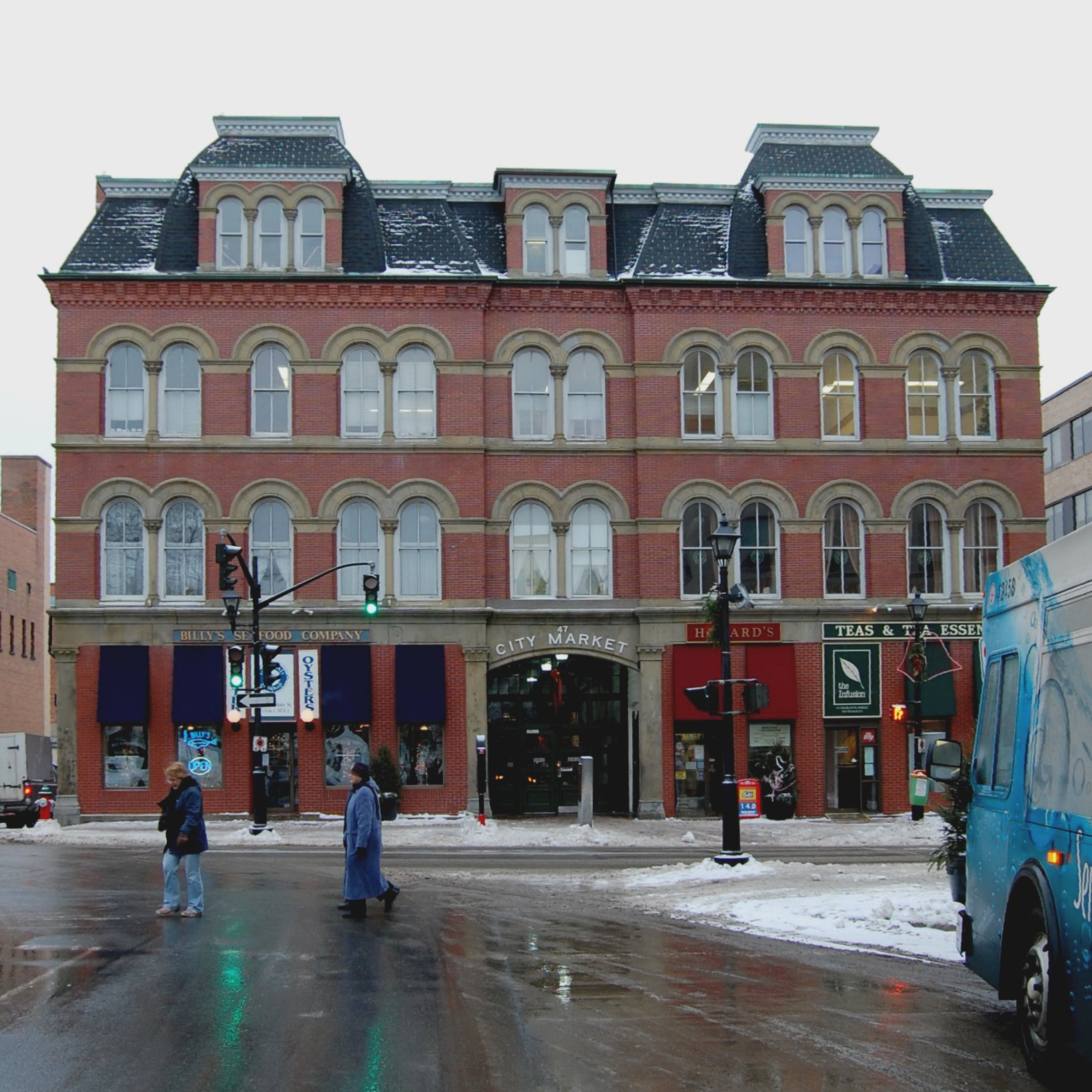
The Saint John City Market building from Charlotte Street.

=== City Market ===
The Saint John City Market is the oldest continuing farmer's market in Canada, with a charter dating from 1785. Located in Saint John, New Brunswick and completed in 1876, the current market building has a unique roof structure that resembles an inverted ship's keel. Made of wooden trusses, the structure was reportedly built by unemployed ship carpenters of the day. Also, the floor slopes with the natural grade of the land. The architecture is in the Second Empire style.

Some of the businesses in the market have been operating continuously there for more than 100 years. Facing onto Kings Square, the market is connected to the city's indoor pedway system.

The market was designated a National Historic Site of Canada in 1986.

=== Courtenay Bay Generating Station ===
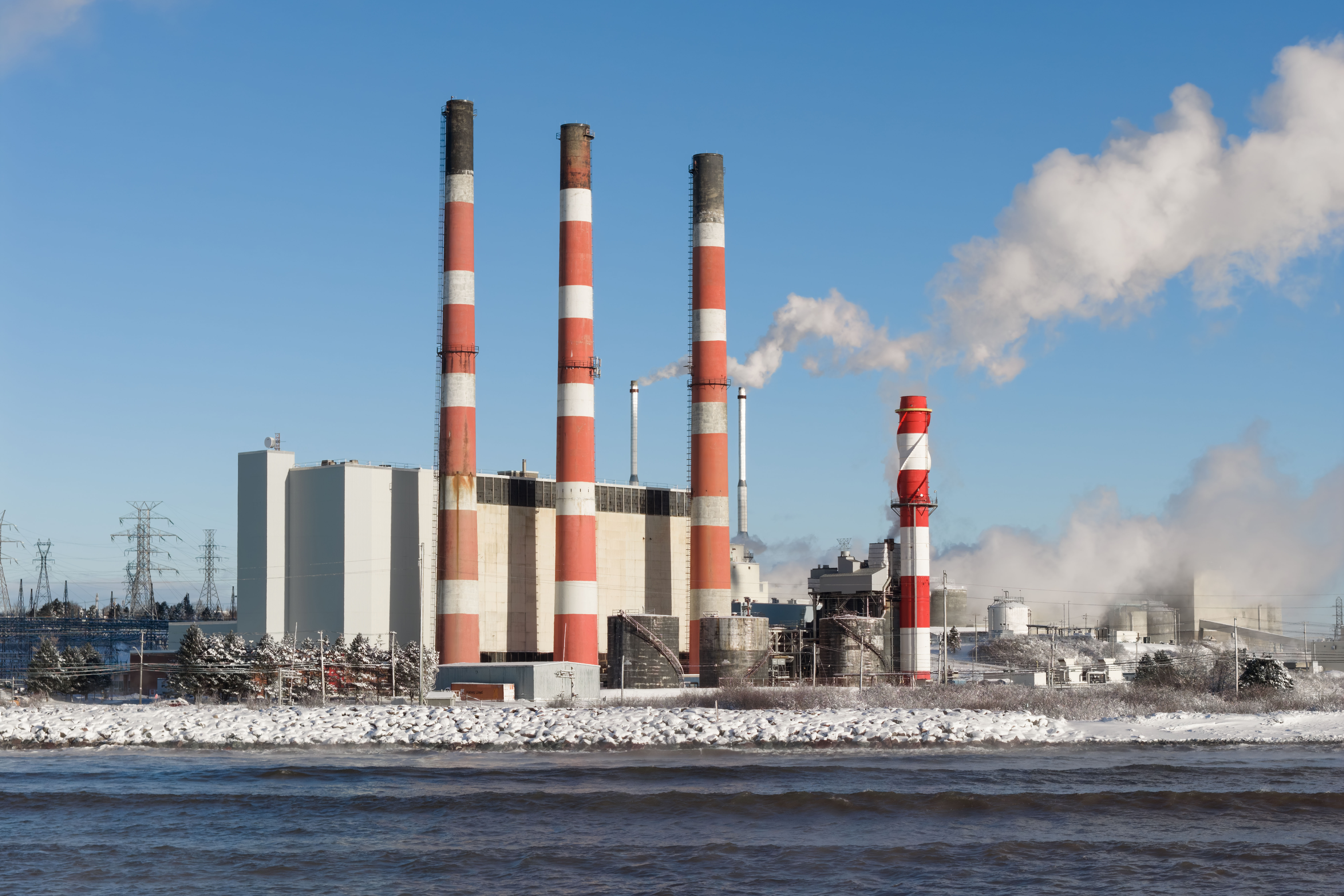
Photograph of the former smokestacks integrated into Bayside Generating Station

The Courtenay Bay Generating Station was an oil-fired power station owned by NB Power that entered service in 1960 and provided baseload electricity for the province. The station was retired in the late 1990s and repurposed as a gas-fired generating station. The original smokestacks remain standing.

== See also ==
- List of tallest buildings in Atlantic Canada
- Canadian architecture
