= Saint John City Hall =

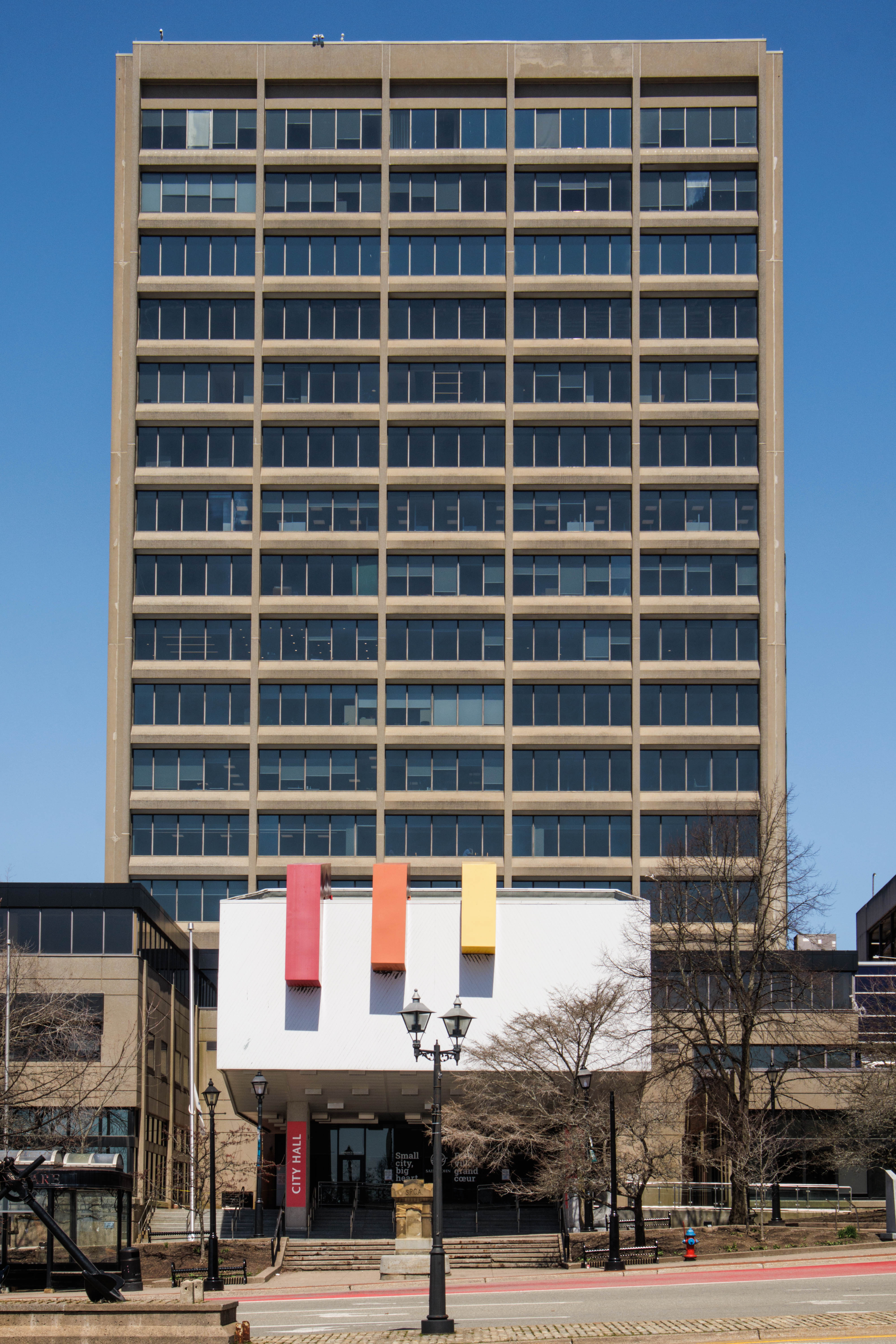
- Saint John City Hall in 2025
- Interactive map of the Saint John City Hall area

General information
- Type: Government offices
- Location: 15 Market Square; Saint John, New Brunswick; E2L 1E8
- Coordinates: 45.273644°N 66.0631137°W
- Completed: 1971

Saint John City Hall is the home of the municipal government in the city of Saint John, New Brunswick, the meeting place of the Saint John City Council, and the office of the Mayor of Saint John. It was built in 1971 and is located at 15 Market Square in uptown Saint John. The building was constructed by Toronto-based Corporation Eighteen Ltd. at a cost of $6 million (equivalent to $47.14 million in 2025). The third floor of the city hall has indoor connection to various buildings in the city, including the Saint John City Market, Market Square, the Saint John Free Public Library, and the Brunswick Square. Additionally, the City Hall's tower building features 180,000 square feet of office space.

== History ==
Saint John's first City Hall was made out of wood. Built in 1797, it is located about where the current city Hall Stands. After the Great Fire of Saint John in 1877, the next City Hall was built in 1878. The building, now known as Old City Hall, was located on 116 Prince William Street and was used as the City Hall until the completion of the current City Hall in 1971.

The current City Hall, built by private Toronto-based development company Corporation Eighteen Ltd., was built at a cost of $6 million (equivalent to $47.14 million in 2025) and featured 17 stories, though it now only has 16. Claude Roussel's design of three aluminum columns painted red, orange and yellow at the exterior entrance of the City Hall was chosen, much to the dismay of some members of the public as well as Saint John Mayor Bob Lockhart, who called the design a "disaster and a personal disappointment."

On June 21, 1977, a fire was started at the ground floor of the City Hall, which had been used as the city jail at the time. The fire, which had been started by a prisoner, killed 21 men who were trapped in confinement.

In 2018, the City Hall's tower building was bought by Historica Developments CEO Keith Brideau, Alex Elias and Dr. David Elias for $3 million. In 2020, renovations were made to the City Hall.

== See also ==
- Saint John
- Saint John City Council
