= J.D. Irving Building =

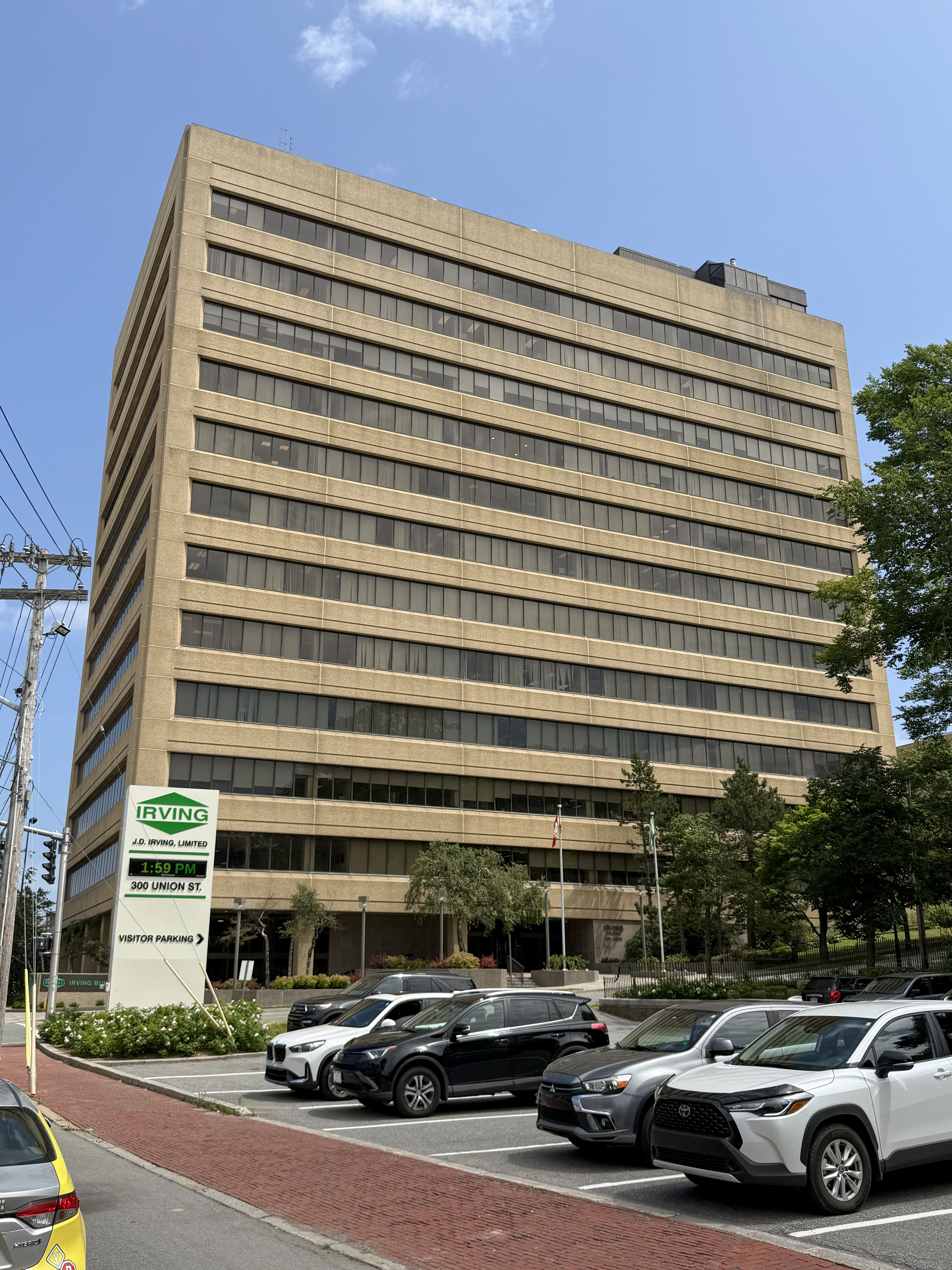
- J.D Irving Building in 2025
- Interactive map of the J.D. Irving Building area

General information
- Location: 300 Union Street, Saint John, New Brunswick, Canada
- Coordinates: 45.2753°N 66.0554°W
- Current tenants: J.D. Irving Limited, JDI Logistics, Atlantic Towing, Kent Headquarters
- Year built: 1977
- Groundbreaking: 1977
- Construction started: 1977
- Completed: 1988
- Opened: 1992

Height
- Height: 61 m (200 ft)

Technical details
- Floor count: 12
- Floor area: 232,000 square feet

J.D Irving Building is a twelve-storey office tower located at 300 Union Street in uptown Saint John, New Brunswick, Canada. The building serves as the corporate headquarters for J.D Irving Limited (JDI), one of Atlantic Canada's largest and most diversified family-owned companies.

== History ==
=== Construction ===
The J.D. Irving Building was constructed in two distinct phases under the structural engineering direction of J.W Cowie Engineering Limited, working with the architectural firm Dumaresq & Byrne Ltd of Halifax. Phase I, a nine-storey steel-framed office building, was completed in 1981, featuring a moment-resisting space frame that supports all gravity and lateral wind loads. Phase II involved the addition of three storeys to the original structure, with construction of this vertical expansion completed in 1988, bringing the building to its current twelve storey height and standing at 61 m (200 ft). The structural system incorporates steel columns supported by deep reinforced precast concreate piles driven to bedrock, with composite floor systems utilizing "Nelson" studs welded to steel beams.

=== After construction ===
The site at 300 Union Street has been the corporate home of J.D. Irving, Limited for decades with the company's roots tracing back to its founding in 1882. Upon completion of Phase I in 1981, the building consolidated JDI's corporate operations in uptown Saint John. The ground floor of the building originally housed the SMT (SMT Eastern) bus terminal, serving as a transportation hub for the city.

== Tenants ==
The building is home to numerous Irving-affiliated companies and divisions, including Irving Pulp & Paper Division, which maintains its headquarter at 300 Union Street. Divisions operating from the building include Irving Consumer Products, Cavendish Farms (food processing), Kent Building Supplies (retail), and Atlantic Wallboard Limited. The J.D Irving Building tenants span across many things like forestry, transportation, shipbuilding, retail, and food processing.

== See also ==
- Irving Oil Home Office
