= Manchester, Robertson & Allison =

Department store in Saint John, Canada

Coordinates: 45.2733°N 66.0609°W

Manchester Robertson Allison Ltd.
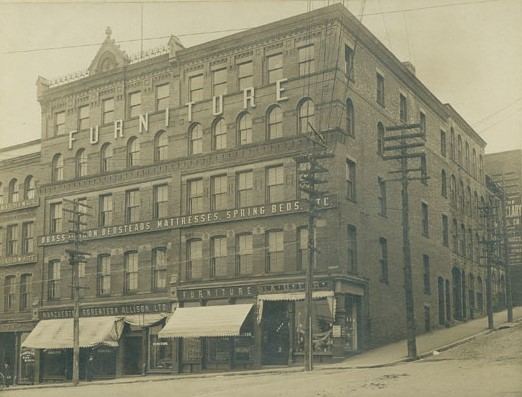
- Company type: Subsidiary
- Industry: Retail
- Founded: 1866; 160 years ago
- Founders: James Manchester; James F. Robertson; Joseph Allison
- Defunct: 1973; 53 years ago
- Fate: Demolished and replaced by the Brunswick Square
- Headquarters: Saint John, New Brunswick, Canada
- Products: dry goods, furniture, clothing, general merchandise
- Number of employees: 500 (1973)

Manchester, Robertson & Allison (colloquially often abbreviated as MRA's) was a large department store in Saint John, New Brunswick, Canada. Founded in 1866 by James Manchester, James F. Robertson and Joseph Allison, the store, which contained several departments, was in business until closing in 1973 and being replaced by the Brunswick Square.

== History ==
In 1866, Manchester Roberson Allison Ltd. was founded in Saint John, New Brunswick, Canada, being named after the surnames of the three founders: James Manchester, James F. Robertson and Joseph Allison. Their first store, located on Prince William Street, was opened on April 3, 1866, initially selling general merchandise and dry goods. They additionally hired a clerk and two boys. As the business grew, they would move into a larger place in Market Square the following year. They would start becoming known as MRA's, and expanded the business on to King Street by 1873, selling dry goods, clothing and a variety of furniture in different departments. According to New Brunswick history author David Goss, MRA's was the location of "Santa's first store appearance in Canada" in 1887, and "his arrival caused such an uproar the police had to be called to disperse the crowd." Manchester, Robertson & Allison would use buildings they purchased on Prince William Street in 1916 as warehouse facilities. Founding member Robertson would serve as president until his death in 1921. The business would also advertise the Port of Saint John in newspapers, where they self-proclaimed themselves as "The Maritimes' Largest Dry Goods House". They would also transition from being private to becoming a corporation in 1928, as well as quit wholesaling.

In 1941, the business would incorporate M.R.A. Holdings Ltd., serving as a holding company for Manchester Robertson Allison Ltd.'s capital stock. By 1948, the store in Saint John featured 45 departments as well as 135,000 square feet (12,500 m^{2}) of floor space on King and Germain Streets. Around the following year, the store was acquired by English chain owner Harry Brooks who implemented a credit policy resulting in controversy among competitor businesses. M.R.A. Holdings Ltd., which additionally own a couple of furniture companies by this point, was purchased by the Saint-John based Eastern Securities Company in 1958. Four years later, the holding company amalgamated New Way Furniture Company into Manchester Robertson Allison Limited. Among Manchester Robertson Allison Ltd.'s serving directors included Philip Oland, who also served as CEO of Moosehead Breweries.

In 1973, after 107 years of business, Manchester, Robertson & Allison closed. Later claimed by The Bangor Daily News as being the last independent department store in the country, The location of the business was set to be demolished in preparation for a $42 million urban renewal development, replacing the store with the Brunswick Square building complex, featuring retail space, an office tower as well as a hotel. M.R.A. Holdings Ltd. was among the sponsors for this project. At the time of its closure, the business employed 200 people full-time, as well as an additional 300 part-time.
