= Market Square (Saint John) =

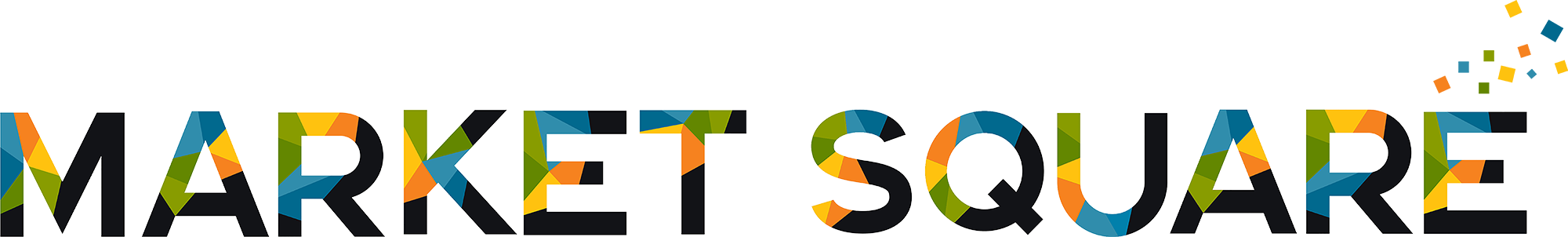
- Location: Saint John, New Brunswick, Canada
- Coordinates: 45.2730°N 66.0651°W
- Address: 1 Market Square, Saint John, NB E2L 4Z6
- Opened: 1983
- Owner: Fundy Harbour Group, previously owned by Hardman Group (1999-2026)
- Floors: 2
- Parking: 550 Underground Parking Stalls
- Website: marketsquaresj.com

Market Square is a mixed-use complex located in the waterfront area of Uptown Saint John, New Brunswick, Canada. It was opened in 1983.

== History ==
Market Square sits at the head of the Market Slip, the historic landing site for the United Empire Loyalists in May 1783. At the time, the slip had been known as Upper Cove. In 1830, the first market building for the city was constructed at Market Square at the head of Market Slip.

Redevelopment attempts for Market Square began in the early 1970s, but initially failed due to financing issues. It officially opened in 1983. Since 1999, it has been owned by Hardman Group until October 2026--when Fundy Harbour Group became new owners of this historic building.

== Notable tenants ==
Among the tenants located at Market Square includes the central branch of the Saint John Free Public Library. Between 1996 and 2022, it also hosted the New Brunswick Museum before closing following leakage. The museum is set to relocate to its original Douglas Avenue site. Other tenants include the constituency office for Saint John—Kennebecasis MP Wayne Long, CHNI-FM, the Saint John Trade and Convention Centre, four restaurants/bars, and the newly renovated Boardwalk.
