= Saint John City Hall fire =

1977 building fire in New Brunswick, Canada

Coordinates: 45.2732°N 66.0629°W

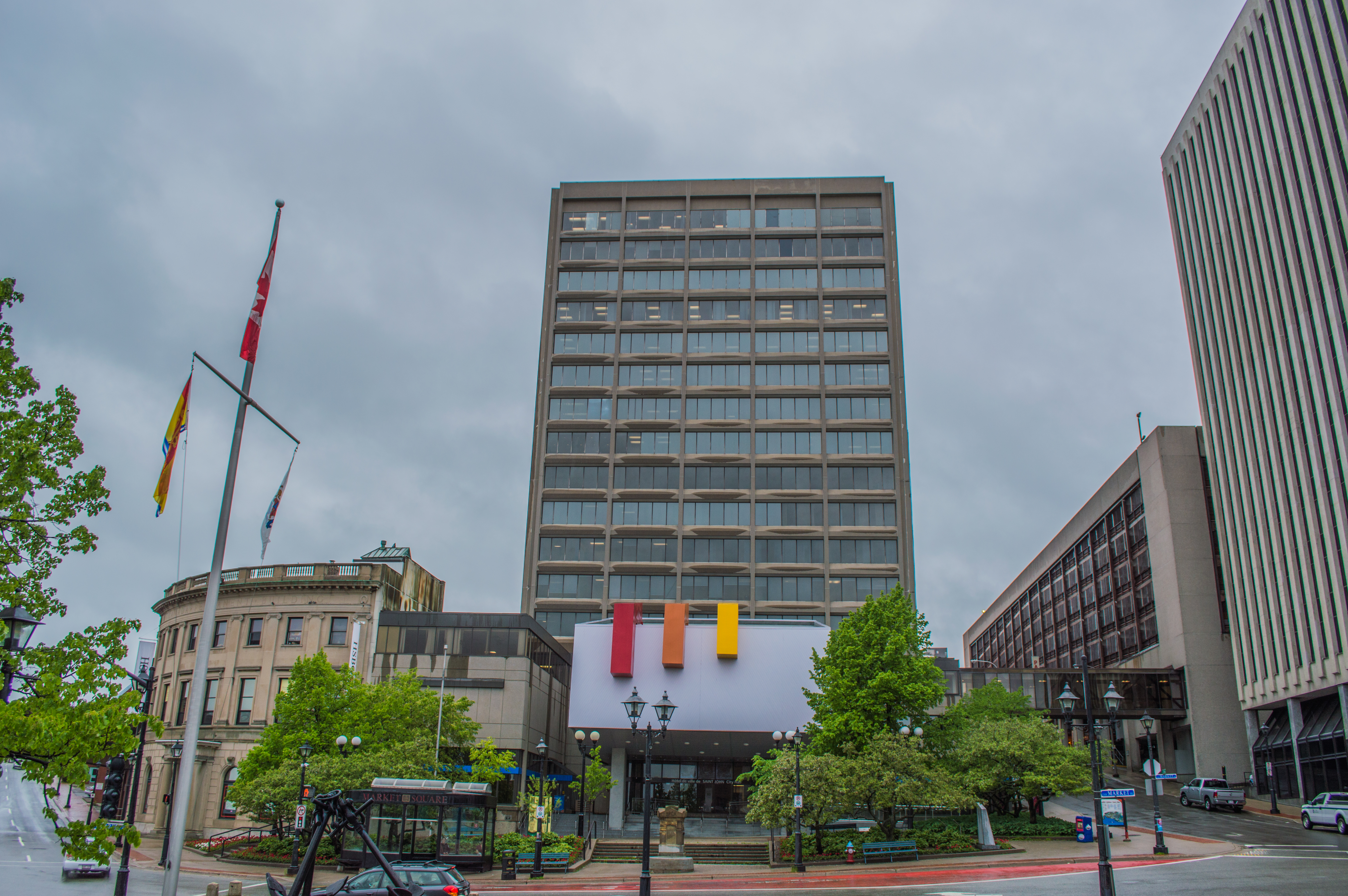
The Saint John City Hall in 2013

The Saint John City Hall fire also known as the Saint John jail fire was a building fire which occurred in Saint John, New Brunswick's city lockup on June 21, 1977 — which at that time was located on the ground floor of the Saint John City Hall. The fire, which had been started by prisoner John Edward Kenney, aged 27, killed 21 men who were trapped in confinement. The fire caused outrage as many of the people who were killed were jailed for minor offences. Further scorn was also directed at elements of the lockup's design such as the padding in the cells, which many claimed was highly flammable. Kenney somehow caused the fire despite being searched twice for matches by police officers.
