= Brunswick Square (building complex) =

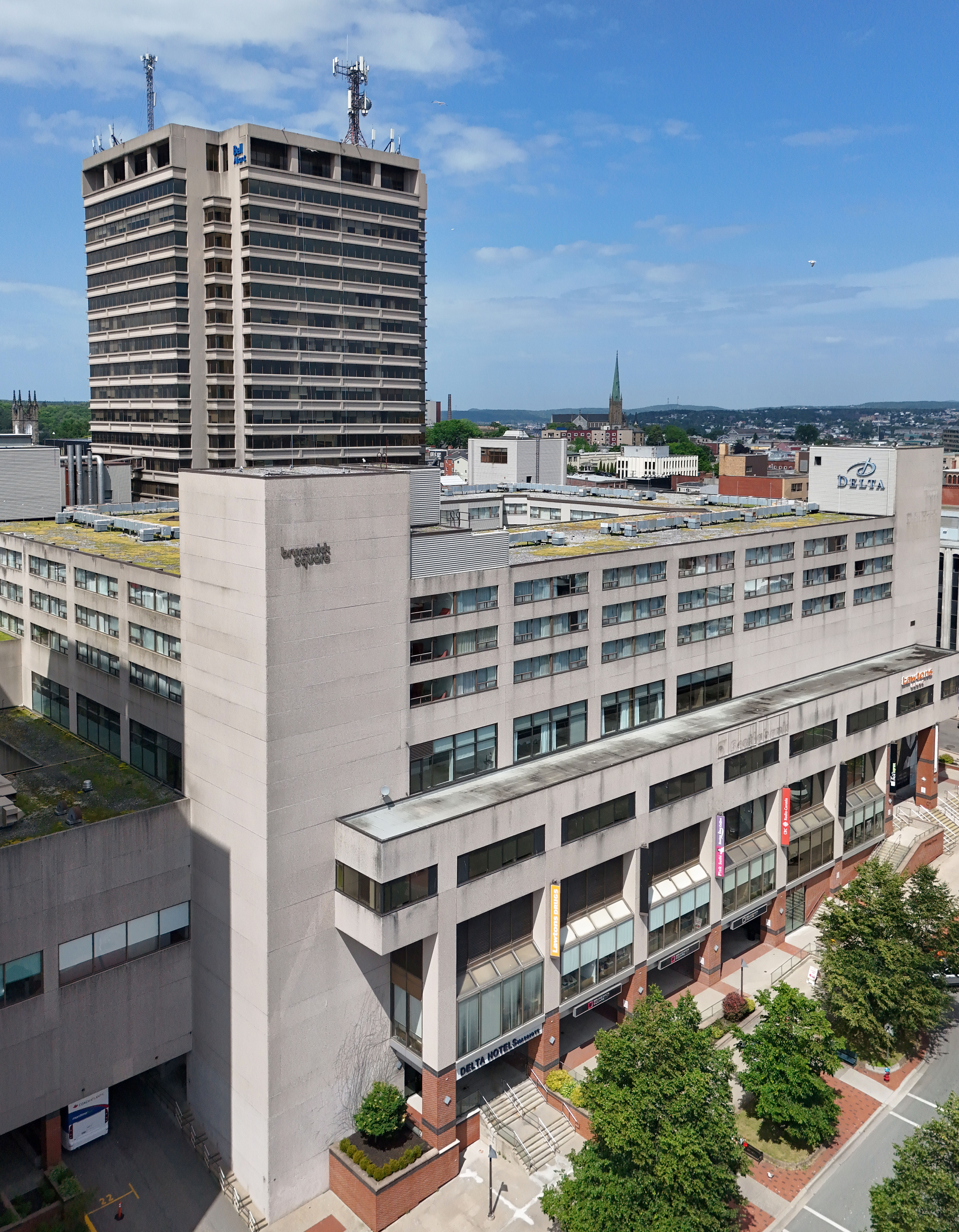
- Brunswick Square's Delta Hotel and 19-storey office tower
- Interactive map of the Brunswick Square area

General information
- Location: 39 King Street, Saint John, New Brunswick, Canada
- Coordinates: 45.2733°N 66.0609°W
- Opened: 1976; 50 years ago
- Owner: Slate Office REIT

Technical details
- Floor count: 3 (shopping mall); 19 (office tower)

Design and construction
- Architects: Webb Zerafa Menkès Housden; Mott, Myles and Chatwin
- Developer: New Brunswick Telephone Company; Bank of Nova Scotia; MRA Holdings; Trizec Corporation

Other information
- Number of stores: 60+ (2012) around 20 (2022)
- Parking: Parking garage

Website
- www.brunswicksquare.ca

Brunswick Square is a mixed-use complex located in uptown Saint John, New Brunswick, Canada. Built by Robert McAlpine in 1976, it is owned by Slate Office REIT. It consists of a 3-storey shopping mall as well as a 19-storey Class A office tower, which is the tallest building in Saint John. The complex contains a 700 capacity parking garage.

Brunswick Square also utilizes the Inside Connection, a large pedway system connecting the complex to other prominent locations in the city such as the Saint John City Market, Delta Hotels, the city hall, TD Station, and other areas.

It is the location for the New Brunswick Black History Society's Black Heritage Site, the first of its kind in New Brunswick.

== History ==
Before its establishment, the site of Brunswick Square was once home to Manchester, Robertson & Allison (MRA's), a large department store that operated from 1866 until its closure on December 31, 1973. The decision to close came as part of a major redevelopment plan for uptown Saint John, announced in August 1973, which outlined a $42 million, two-phase private development project spearheaded by a consortium including the New Brunswick Telephone Company, the Bank of Nova Scotia, MRA Holdings Ltd., and Trizec Corporation. The project was designed by Toronto architectural firm Webb Zerafa Menkès Housden in collaboration with Saint John-based Mott, Myles and Chatwin.

Demolition was originally anticipated to begin in early February 1974, but was delayed slightly to allow remaining MRA staff to fully vacate the premises. Demolition officially began around mid-February 1974, starting with property on Germain Street by the Loyalist House. Demolition continued through March, progressing down King Street and eventually dismantling the former MRA buildings. Final site clearance was set to begin mid-March and was anticipated to wrap up several weeks ahead of its deadline.

The first phase of construction consisted of the 19-storey office tower which was to serve as the headquarters for the New Brunswick Telephone Company. The second phase was to add 14 more floors to the office tower for a total of 33 floors, along with the addition of a retail complex and a 250-room Hilton hotel. Brunswick Square was completed in 1976. It was built by Robert McAlpine. Upon completion, it became the tallest building in Saint John. In November, a celebratory event took place, featuring the premier, Richard Hatfield, who cut a replica cake of the complex using a sword.

=== Closures during the 2010s–2020s ===
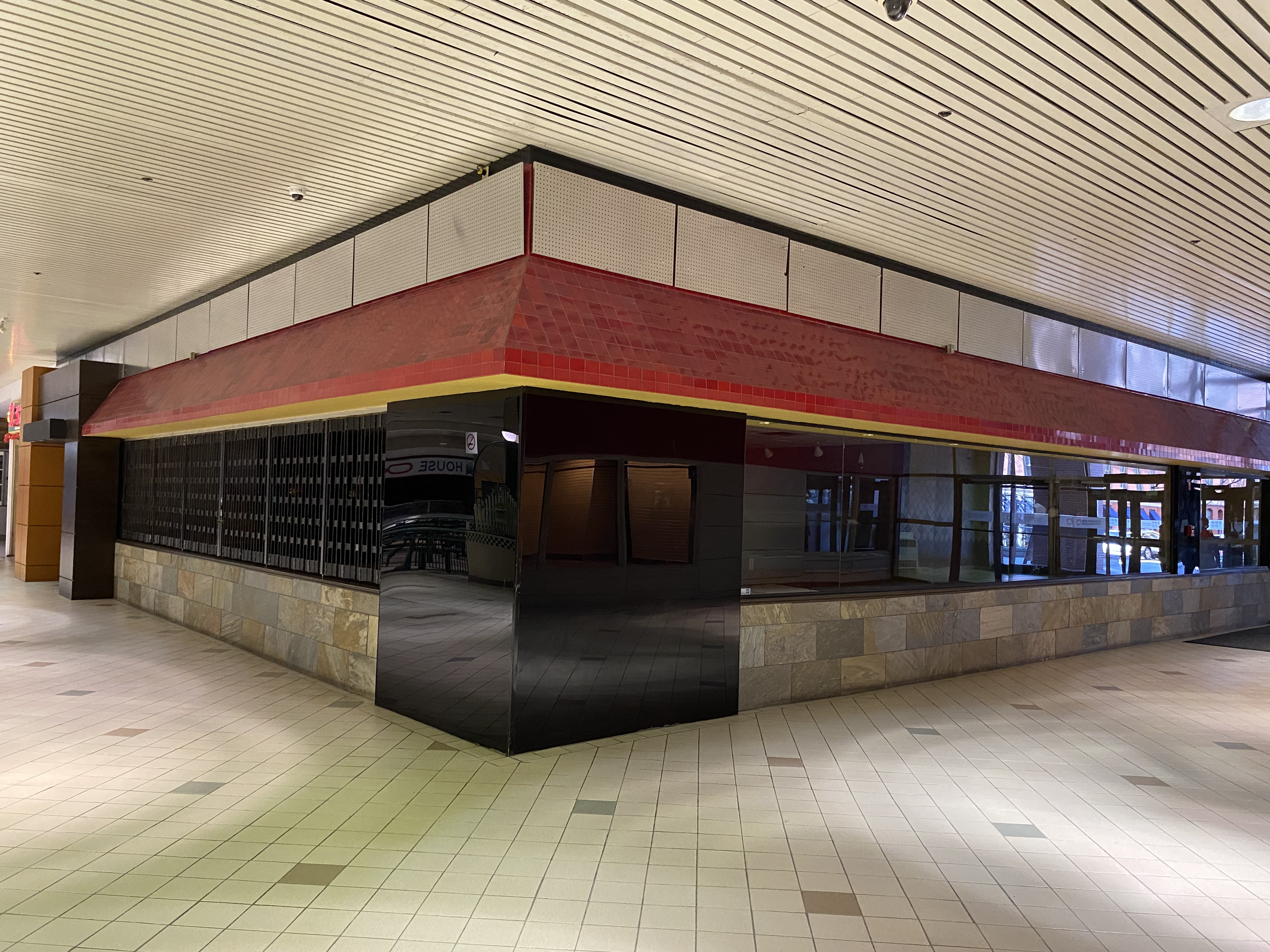
Former Pizza Hut site in the mall

In 2015, the property was sold by Fortis Properties, a subsidiary of Fortis Inc., to Slate Office REIT as part of a $430 million deal that included 13 other office and retail buildings across Atlantic Canada. The shopping mall faced increasing challenges in the years that followed. By 2017, significant tenant losses, such as Starbucks, reflected broader difficulties faced by indoor malls across Canada. Former tenants cited high rents, inflexible mall hours, and a lack of modernization as significant issues driving them out of the complex. Multiple local businesses owners found more flexibility after relocating to nearby locations.

By 2022, the mall had lost nearly two-thirds of its tenants, shrinking from over 60 businesses in 2012 to just over 20, leaving nearly 40 storefronts vacant. The third floor of the mall had been almost entirely empty with the exception of a Cora restaurant, which ultimately closed in 2024. Several closures, largely from businesses in the lower-level food court, occurred during the COVID-19 pandemic. According to Slate's third quarter report from 2023, Brunswick Square was 52.2% occupied at the time.

In April 2024, Brunswick Square was listed for sale.
