= Saint John Free Public Library =

- Type: Public Library in Saint John
- Established: 1883
- Branches: 3

Collection
- Items collected: business directories, phone books, maps, government publications, books, periodicals, genealogy, local history,

Other information
- Website: Saint John Free Public Library

The Saint John Free Public Library incorporated in 1883, was the first tax-supported public library in Saint John, New Brunswick, Canada, hence the inclusion of "Free" in the title.

The Saint John Free Public Library consists of three branches, the central branch in the Market Square complex, East Branch in the Saint John Transit Building, and West Branch in Lancaster Mall. All of these libraries are under the Fundy Library Region, which is headquartered in Market Square.

== Services ==
- Information and reference services
- Access to full text databases
- Community information
- Internet access
- Reader's advisory services
- Programs for children, youth and adults
- Delivery to homebound individuals
- Interlibrary loan
- Free downloadable audiobooks

== History ==
St. John Mechanics' Institute was one of a series of Mechanic's Institutes that were set up around the world after being popularized in Britain. It housed a subscription library that allowed members who paid a fee to borrow books. The Mechanic's Institutes libraries eventually became public libraries after the establishment of free libraries.

1811: New Brunswick's very first library opened in Saint John in 1811 operated on a subscription basis with a fee being charged for the use of the collections.

1874: Plans for a free public library in Saint John were initiated by the President of the Mechanics' Institute.

1877: Great Saint John Fire delayed plans for library.

1879: Colonel James Domville, member of council was actively involved in the procurement of a book collection for the use of the public library and to replace the collection destroyed by the fire.

1883: First tax supported public library in Canada, the Saint John Free Public Library opened in the City Market on Charlotte Street.

1885: The library moved to the Masonic Temple building on Germain Street where it remained for 19 years.

1904: Thanks to a $50,000 donation from the American philanthropist Andrew Carnegie, a new library building opened on Hazen Avenue.

1912: The card catalogue first started being used.

1915: Story hours for children were inaugurated.

1967: West Branch opened in Lancaster Mall.

1968: East Branch opened in the Loch Lomond Mall.

1975: East Branch relocated to Westmorland Place.

1983: The library moved into new quarters in the Market Square harbour front complex.

1998: Automated circulation services was introduced.

2000: The Millennium Artplace was opened in the library lobby.

== Collections ==
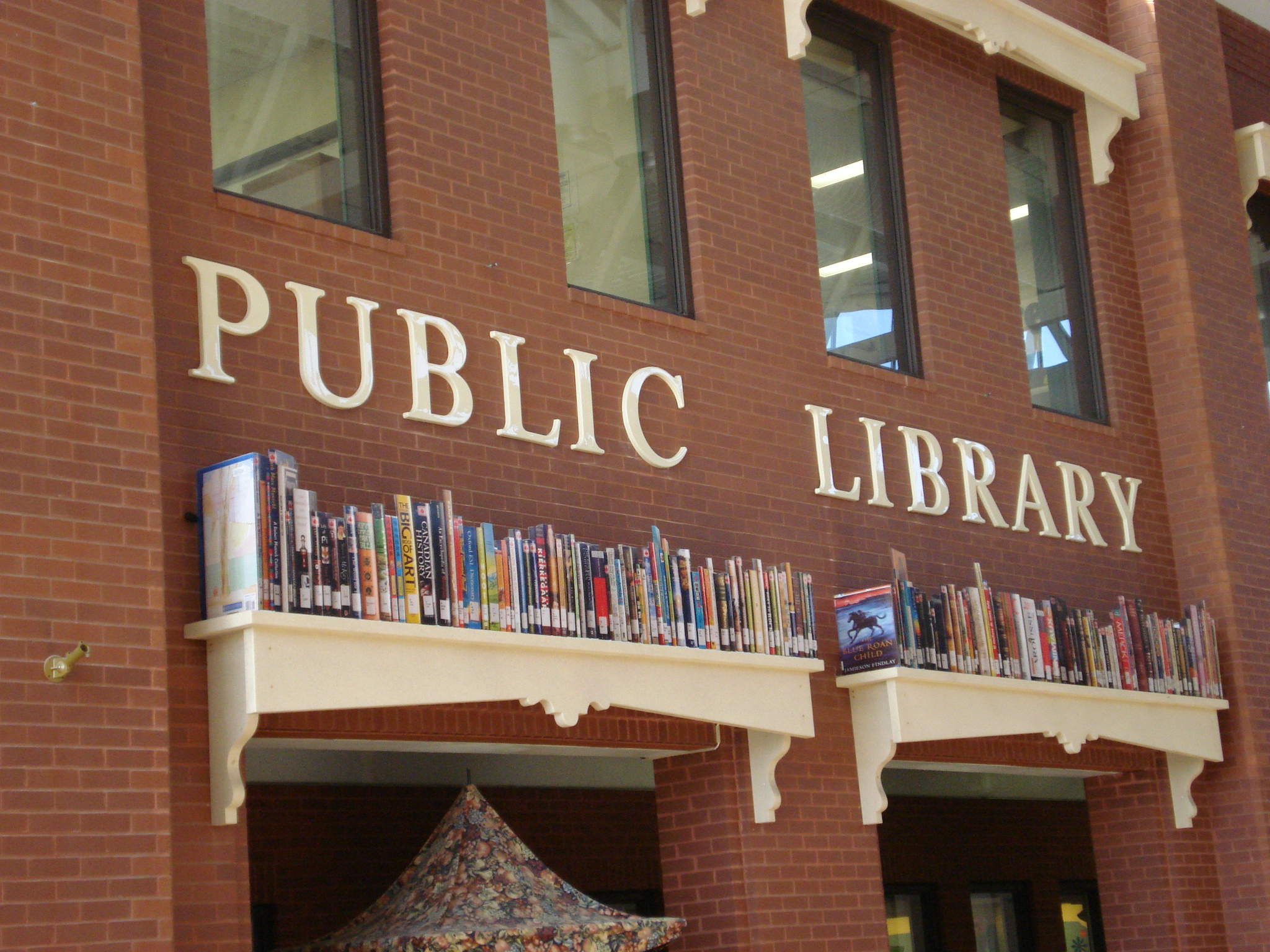
Exterior view of the library

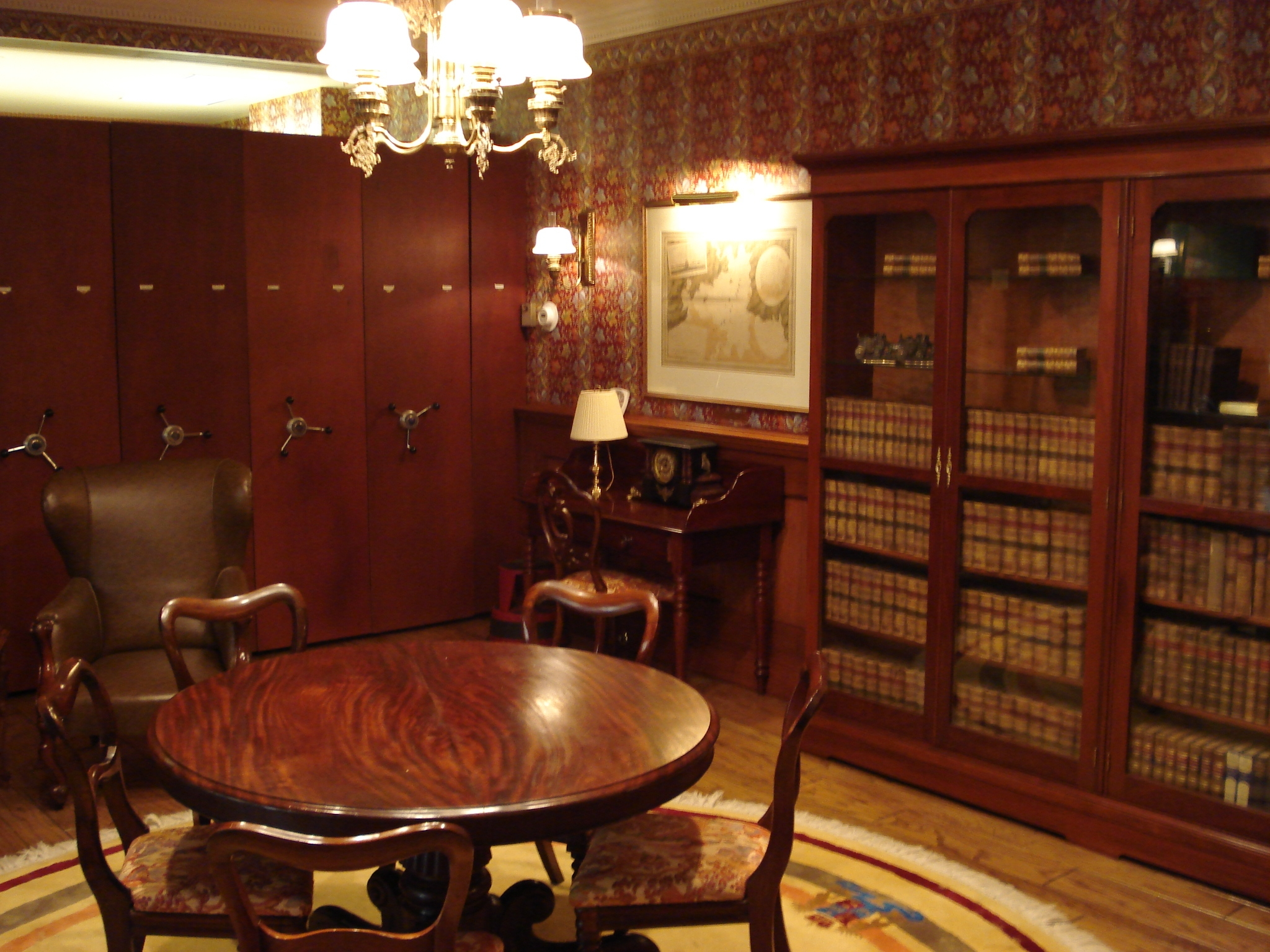
The Special Collections Room

- Enjoy reading materials for all your information & recreation needs including bestsellers, large print books, audiobooks, music, DVDs and videos for all ages, magazines, language kits, adult literacy materials, talking books for the visually and physically challenged and braille books for children.
- Saint John Newspapers - Newspapers on microfilm date back to the late 18th century.
- Programs for children including Babies in the Library, Toddlertime, Preschool Storytime and Family Drop in.
- Adult programs such as computer courses, tutorials, genealogical information and research assistance.
- Meinhardt Reading Room - a reading oasis nestled in the heart of the library.
- New Readers' Area - featuring books of different reading levels for adult learners and ESL students.
- House of Languages - featuring books in 11 languages including French, Korean, Chinese and Spanish.
- Teen Zone D'Ados – Books, computers and a place for teens to work and relax.
- Special Collections room – Decorated in the style of a 19th-century Victorian salon, this room features a collection of over 9,000 unique items from Saint John's earliest days.
- Barbara Ring Collection of art; featuring over thirty original pieces of artwork from the Atlantic provinces.

== Library Branches ==
- Central Library 1 Market Square, Saint John, N.B. E2L 4Z6
- East Branch 55 McDonald Street, Saint John, N.B. E2J 0C7
- West Branch 621 Fairville Blvd. Saint John, N.B. E2M 4X5

== Sources ==
- Carnegie Libraries in Canada
- History of The Carnegie Building
