= Fundy Quay =

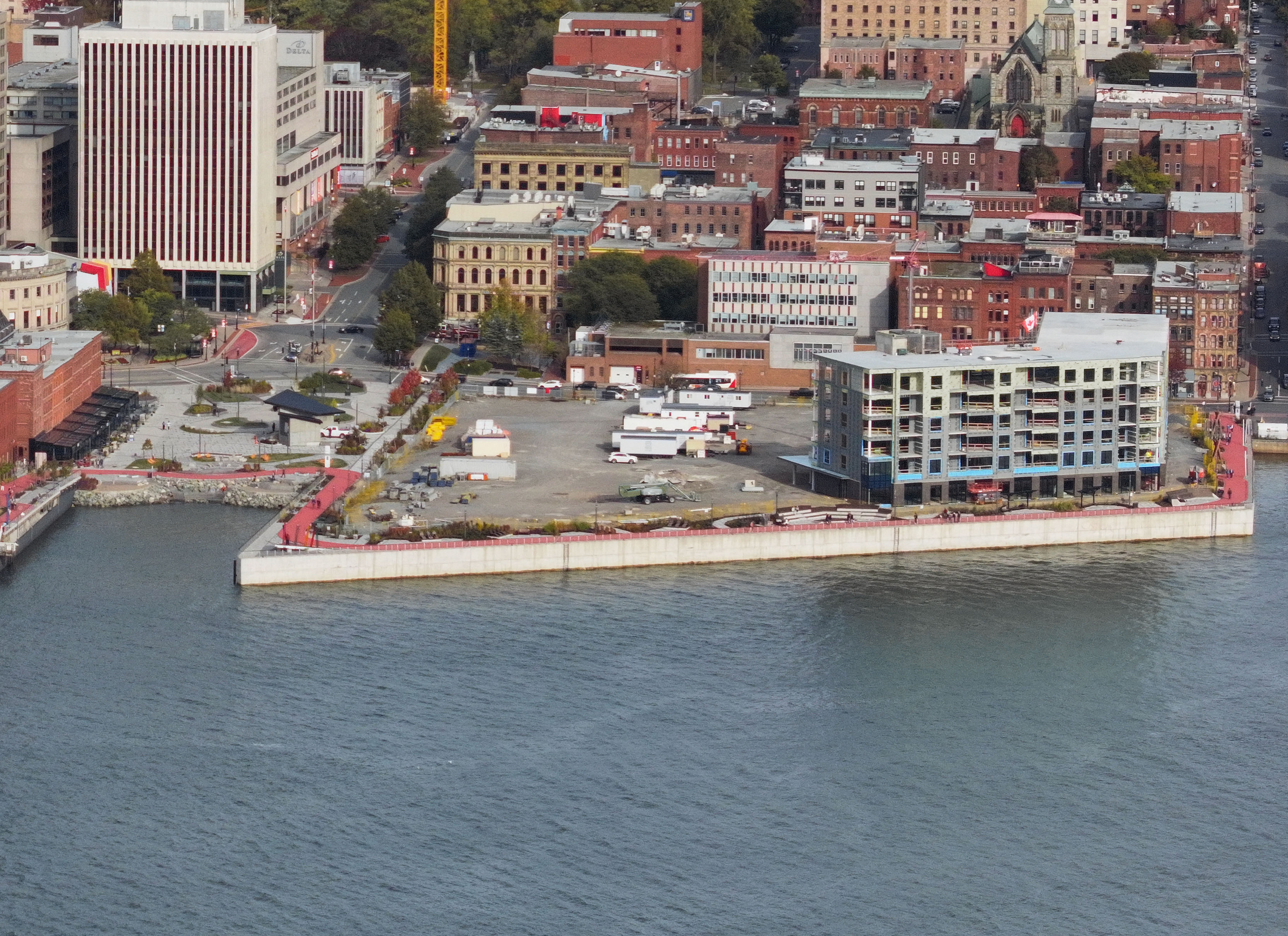
- Fundy Quay in October 2025
- Interactive map of Fundy Quay
- Location: Saint John, New Brunswick, Canada
- Coordinates: 45.271692°N 66.063950°W
- Status: Under construction
- Groundbreaking: 2023
- Website: fundyquay.com

Companies
- Developer: Fundy Harbour Group

Technical details
- Cost: CA$300 million (estimated)
- Buildings: 5

The Fundy Quay is an ongoing mixed-use development in Saint John, New Brunswick, Canada. Situated on a former Canadian Coast Guard site along the Saint John Harbour, it is part of a waterfront redevelopment plan for the city.

The first building is currently under construction and is scheduled to be completed in late 2026.

== Description ==
The Fundy Quay development is a project by the Fundy Harbour Group. It is set to contain five mixed-use buildings with a total floor space of 69,700 square metres. The buildings' ground floors are allocated for commercial and retail use, with the remaining floors designated for a total of 677 residential units. The complex will also include more than 400 internal parking spaces.

The development has an estimated budget of $300 million. Funding for parts of the project were supported by the federal, provincial and municipal governments. The three levels of government committed to contribute a combined $24 million for the infrastructure project to support the site's redevelopment. In October 2025, the federal government announced an additional $30 million investment through the Apartment Construction Loan Program for the first building's 79 residential units.

The Fundy Quay also includes a public space named "Ihtoli-maqahamok – The Gathering Space". The name is derived from "gathering space" in the Wolastoqiyik language, and was officially opened on July 22, 2024.

=== Buildings ===
The buildings are set to be constructed sequentially at a pace of one building for every two years, with completion expected for 2032.

Building Phase	Location	Floors	Units	Use	Status
1 (Southwest)	35 Water Street	6	79 (Note: Originally 111 when approved.)	Residential and retail	Under construction
2 (Southeast)	Southeast corner, Water Street frontage	16	165	Residential and retail	Approved in December 2021 as "Phase 1"
3 (Northwest)	Northwest	16	173	Mixed-use	Proposed; estimated build-out target is 2028
4 (Northeast)	Northeast corner	19	188	Mixed-use	Proposed; estimated build-out target is 2030
5 (Community / Cultural)	Waterfront	4	40 (potential)	Community/cultural	Proposed; estimated build-out target is 2032

The first building, located on the southwest corner, will be six floors (Note: Earlier reports mention the first building being 16 floors and on the southeast corner. This is due to Fundy Harbour Group deciding to switch to building on the southwest corner instead in January 2023.) with 79 units and ground-floor retail.

== History ==
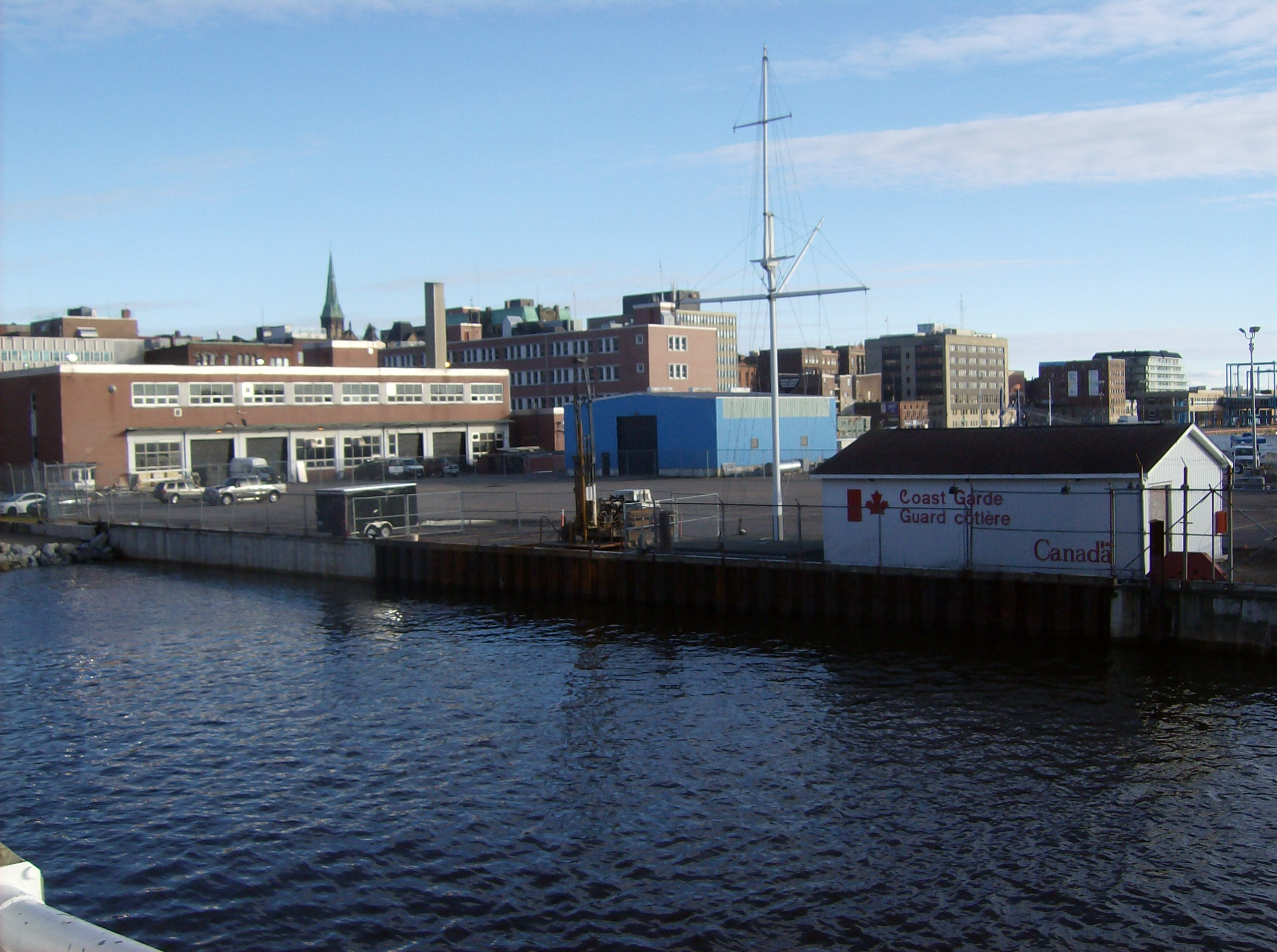
The Coast Guard site pictured in 2013

The site of the Fundy Quay development was previously used by the Canadian Coast Guard as one of their sites. The City of Saint John acquired the site from Fisheries and Oceans Canada in January 2011 for $2.8 million amidst Coast Guard relocation plans.

=== Failed proposals (2005-2018) ===
In early 2005, the Saint John Development Corporation issued a call for proposals, selecting the Hardman Group's $75 million hotel and condominium proposal in November. The project was scrapped in 2011 due to lengthy delays in the land transfer process. Proposals of a project on the site under the "Fundy Quay" name began as early as 2012. In 2016, Moosehead Breweries announced plans to build a small-batch brewery on the site, but the project was cancelled the following year due to budgeting shortfalls. In 2018, the city subdivided and sold a portion of the site to the province for a new New Brunswick Museum location, though the project was also cancelled. Old Coast Guard buildings were periodically demolished, including the administrative building in 2018.

=== Fundy Harbour Group (2019-present) ===
In 2019, it was announced that David Elias would be developing the project.

In April 2022, construction began to revitalize the site's seawall. In January 2023, the Saint John City Council unanimously voted to approve the construction of the second of the five buildings. That same year, as part of the project, construction also began on outdoor patios for business in the neighbouring Market Square. The first building began construction in late 2023.
