= Irving Oil Home Office =

Office building in New Brunswick, Canada

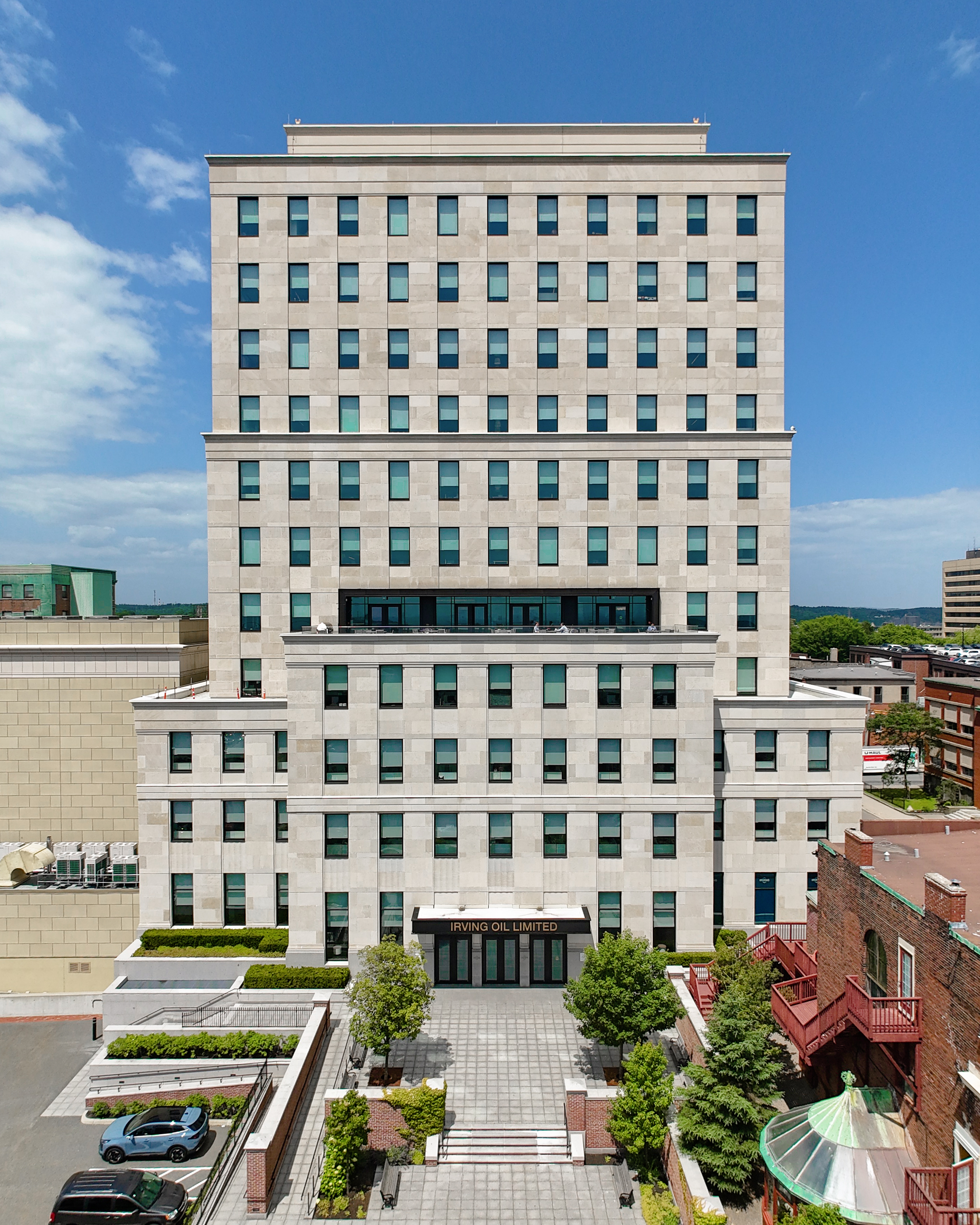
- Aerial view in 2025
- Interactive map of the Irving Oil Home Office area

General information
- Architectural style: Modernist
- Location: 10 King Square South, Saint John, New Brunswick, Canada
- Coordinates: 45°16′23″N 66°3′26″W
- Construction started: June 6, 2016
- Opened: Fall 2019
- Cost: CA$88 million
- Client: Irving Oil

Technical details
- Floor count: 11
- Floor area: 18,581 m^{2} (200,000 sq ft)

Design and construction
- Architect: Alex Novell
- Architecture firm: B+H Architects

The Irving Oil Home Office is the corporate head office of Irving Oil. Designed by architect Alex Novell and architectural firm B+H Architects, the 11-storey building is located at 10 King Square South by King's Square in Saint John, New Brunswick. It sits next door to the Imperial Theatre, and was constructed on one of their employee parking lots. Construction began on June 6, 2016, and it officially opened in the fall of 2019. The home office has an area of 18,581 m^{2} (200,000 sq ft). Its fifth floor has an outdoor terrace and the 11th floor has a roof skylight. The building is LEED certified.

== Description ==
The Irving Oil Home Office sits on 10 King Square South, located next to King's Square in Saint John, New Brunswick. Measuring at a height of 11 storeys, it was built on one of their employee parking lots, with an area of 18,581 m^{2} (200,000 sq ft), and a height of approximately 56.6 m (186 ft). The home office has an outdoor terrace on the fifth floor, and a roof skylight on the 11th. The building also has a LEED Silver certification.

== Construction ==
This was not the first time Irving Oil had planned to build a headquarters in Saint John. Previously, the company intended to build a $30 million headquarters on Saint John's Long Wharf but cancelled these plans in 2010. On October 21, 2015, it was officially announced that the Irving Oil Home Office would be constructed on one of their employee parking lots next to the Imperial Theatre. Landscape architect Alex Novell and the architectural firm B+H Architects was hired by Irving Oil to design the building, with the aim being to relocate approximately 1,000 Irving Oil employees from five separate offices into one large office building. Construction was scheduled to begin in April 2016, but plans were delayed due to an appeal regarding the proposed building site's location within Saint John's heritage conservation area, which imposed specific building limitations. The city council revised the heritage rules with respect to the proposed site to facilitate the project's continuation. Construction began on the morning of June 6, 2016, with an expected completion date between 18 and 24 months from then.

On February 6, 2018, 33-year-old construction worker, Adam Carleton, died in the hospital after receiving a head injury from a fall in the construction site the previous day. WorkSafeNB launched an investigation to determine if the death had violated the Occupational Health and Safety Act.

In March 2019, employees began relocating to the home office, and it officially opened in the fall of the same year. In 2020, Service New Brunswick assessed the building's value for taxes at $56.8 million, significantly lower than the estimated construction cost of $88 million.
