= Irving Pulp and Paper =

Company in New Brunswick, Canada

Irving Pulp & Paper
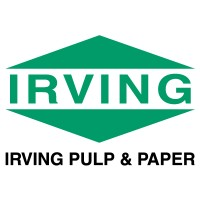
- Industry: Cardboard - Paper Pulp - Paper Packaging - Wood Packaging - Cellulose, Pile Driving, Project Management
- Founded: 1951; 75 years ago
- Headquarters: Saint John, New Brunswick, Canada
- Revenue: 625 millions $ (2024)
- Number of employees: 2,658 (2024)
- Website: irvingequipment.com

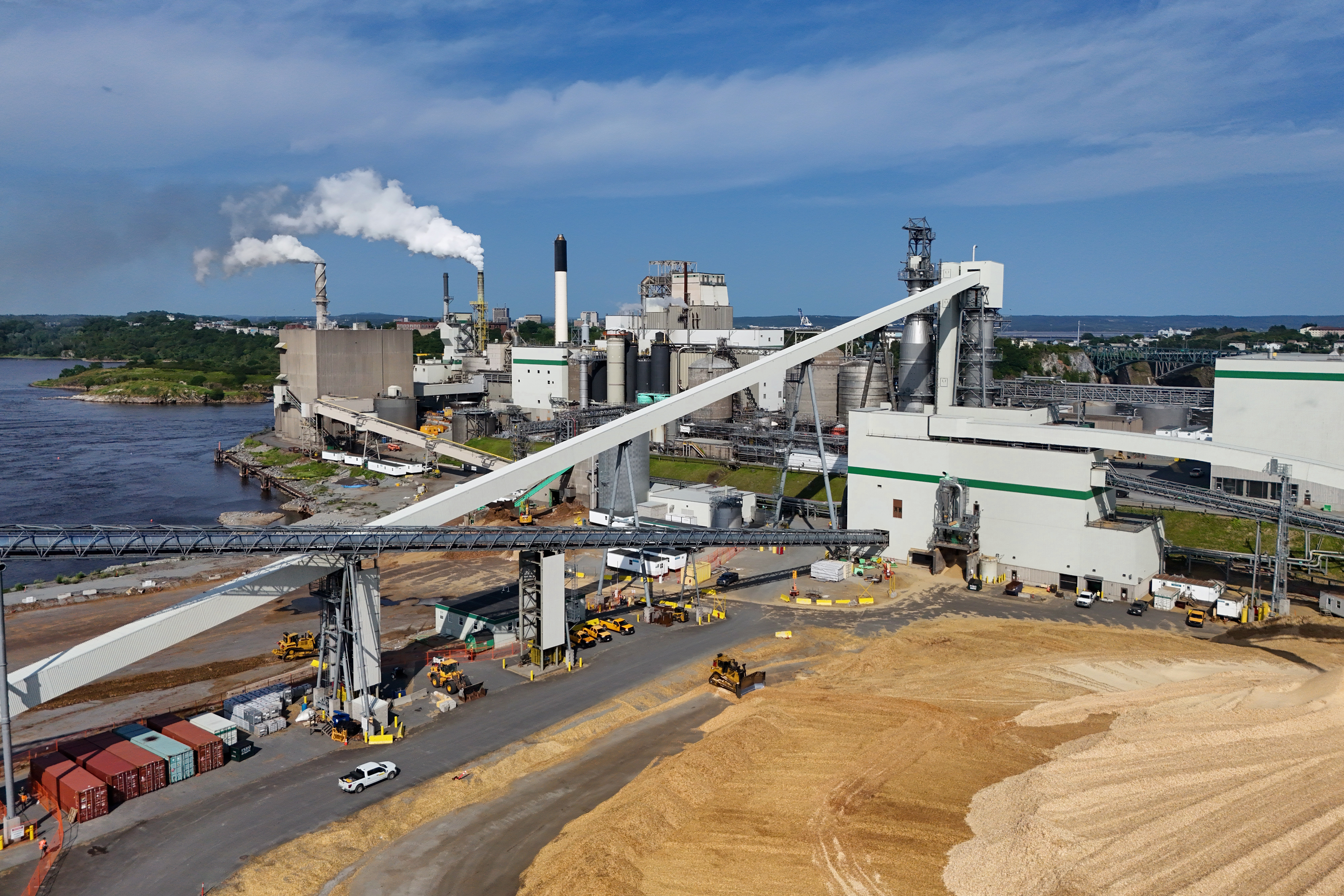
Irving Pulp and Paper mill on the Saint John River

The Irving Pulp and Paper Limited, previously Irving Pulp Mill, Reversing Falls, is a private company located in west Saint John, New Brunswick, Canada, owned and operated by generations of the K. C. Irving (1899–1992) family since 1951. After the death of K. C. Irving, his oldest son, J. D. Irving (b. 1928), inherited the forestry branch of the Irving Group of Companies, which included the mill.

== Overview ==
The original nineteenth century mill at its current location in west Saint John, on the Saint John River at the Reversing Falls, was owned and operated by the Andre Cushing and Company. The location was also the site of the Cushing Sulphite Fibre Company Limited Mill and then the Sulphite Pulp Mill, Reversing Falls.

Since then, the mill has been known as the Irving Pulp Mill, Reversing Falls and the Reversing Falls pulp and paper mill, as well as it current name, the Irving Pulp and Paper Limited.

K. C. Irving, who had inherited the Irving family lumber business, J.D. Irving Limited, from his father in 1933—established the Irving Pulp and Paper Limited in 1951.

By 2018, J.D. Irving's three New Brunswick paper mills—Irving Paper and Irving Pulp & Paper in Saint John, and Lake Utopia Paper near St. George, "represent a team of over 830 people and over $230 million in local purchases from New Brunswick suppliers."

== History ==
In the nineteenth century, then-Massachusetts-based Andre Cushing (1820–1891) and his nephew George Bryon Cushing (1831–1888) owned "extensive timber holdings" in northern Maine. They were dependent on the St. John River to transport their logs. In mid-century they moved their families to Saint John and purchased land in Union and Reversing Falls area in west Saint John. They owned and operated the pulp mill near the Reversing Falls. Their mill was destroyed by fire in 1885, rebuilt in 1896 and employed up to 225 men. George Cushing expanded the company throughout the 1890s which included the establishment of the Cushing Sulphite Fibre Company to use waste from the mill. In 1898, the Cushings operations were called Andre Cushing and Company.

== Irving Forest Products & Services ==
Irving Pulp and Paper Limited, Irving Paper Limited, Irving Tissue Company Limited are part of the Irving Forest Products & Services which is owned and operating by the holding company J.D. Irving, Ltd. The J.D. Irving Limited also includes JDI Integrated Logistics (formerly Irving Transportation Services), Irving Shipbuilding, Irving Retail & Distribution Services, Irving Consumer Products, Industrial Equipment & Construction, Specialty Printing, Personnel Services, Security Services, Amateur Sports, and Brunswick News.

== Constitutional challenge ==
In 2018, Irving Pulp and Paper Limited was charged with 15 counts under the Fisheries Act after its Reversing Falls pulp and paper mill in west Saint John, New Brunswick discharged a harmful effluent in ten instances into the Saint John River between June 2014 and August 2016. The penalty was set at CA$3.5 million—"one of the largest penalties for depositing of deleterious substances. In a New Brunswick provincial court, Irving pleaded guilty in October 2018, to three of the fifteen charges and "agreed to pay $3.5 million in penalties as part of an agreed statement of facts and joint recommendation". The Crown prosecutor Paul Adams said that volume and toxicity of the effluent were "very significant". In response, in October 2018, Irving lawyers challenged the constitutionality of the Fisheries Act. The Saint John mill was convicted for violating the Fisheries Act in 1999, 2009 and 2010 with penalties ranged between CA$37,000 and CA$75,000.
