= Saint John City Market =

Coordinates: 45.2735°N 66.0598°W

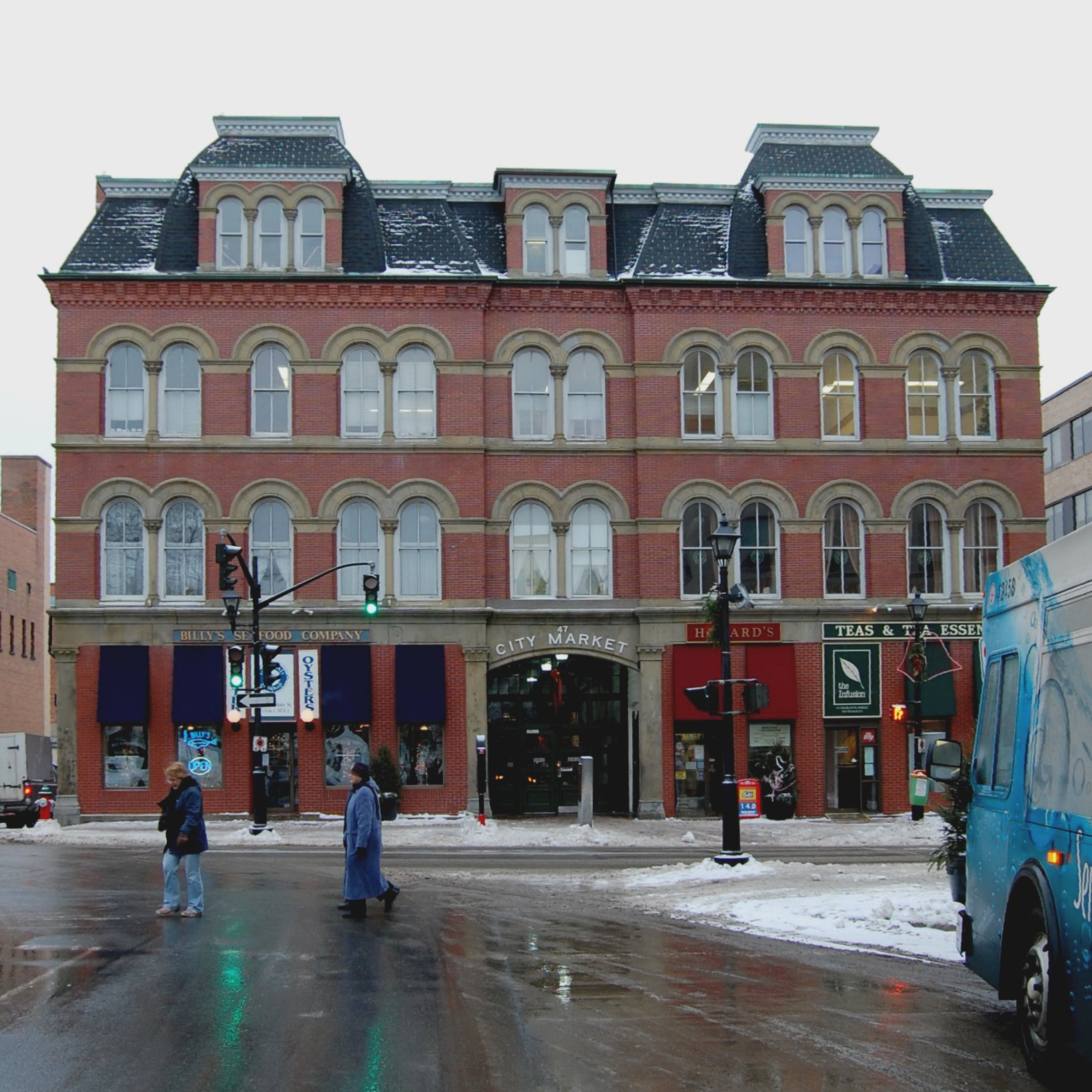
- Market exterior
- Location: Saint John, New Brunswick, Canada
- Established: 1785
- Built: 1876
- Website: www.sjcitymarket.ca

National Historic Site of Canada
- Designated: 1986

The Saint John City Market in Saint John, New Brunswick, is the oldest continuously operated farmer's market in Canada, with a charter dating from 1785. The market is located at 47 Charlotte Street.

== History ==
Prior to the establishment of the market at its current location, the city of Saint John operated several public markets. The government of New Brunswick enacted a law permitting a public fish market, located in the Water Street slips to be operated by the city of Saint John, in 1855. Another was a hay market, run at the head of King Street. The first two buildings to house the market, both made of wood, were destroyed by fire. The current building was designed by architects J.T.C. McKean and G.E. Fairweather in the Second Empire style, and completed in 1876. The building narrowly escaped the 1877 fire which destroyed 40% of the city's buildings.

The City Market has a unique interior roof structure, which resembles an inverted ship's keel. Made of wooden trusses, the structure was reportedly built by unemployed ship carpenters of the day. Also, the floor slopes with the natural grade of the land.

Some of the businesses in the market have been operating continuously there for more than 100 years. Facing onto Kings Square, the market is connected to the city's indoor pedway system.

The market was designated a National Historic Site of Canada in 1986.

== Gallery ==
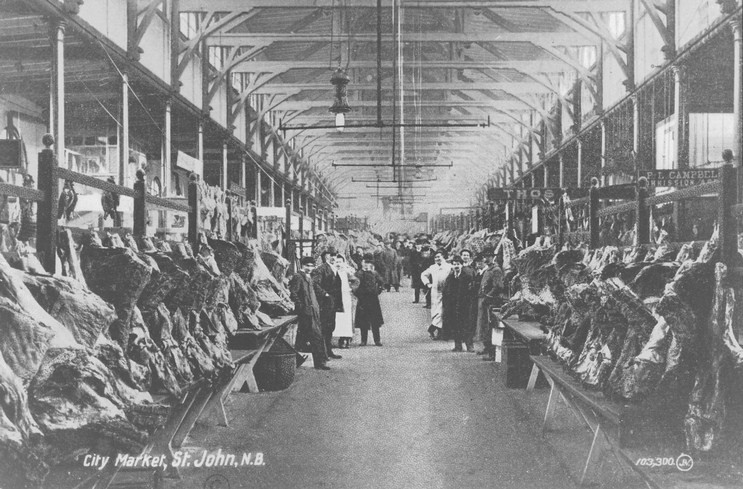
Market interior (1910)

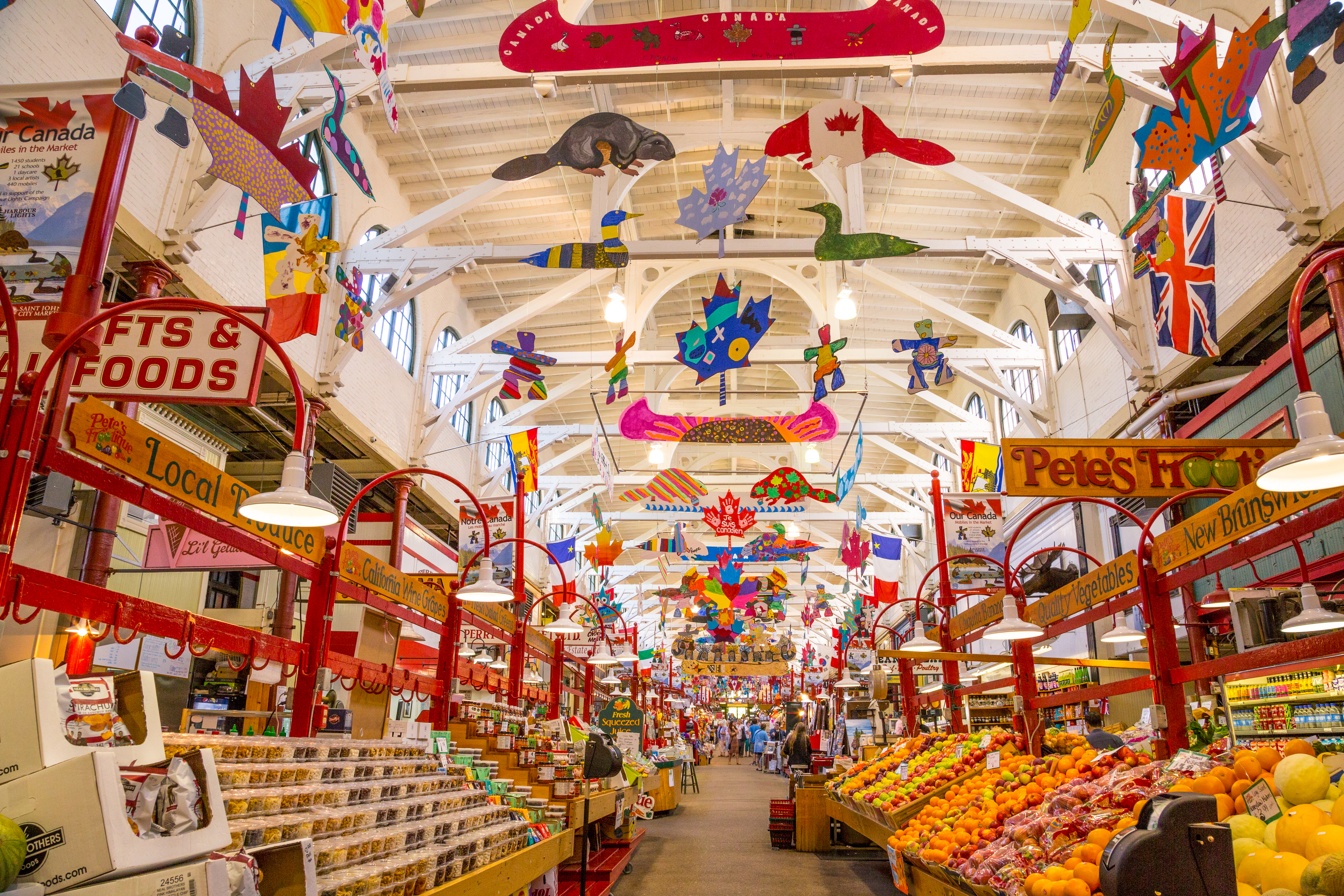
Market interior (2018)

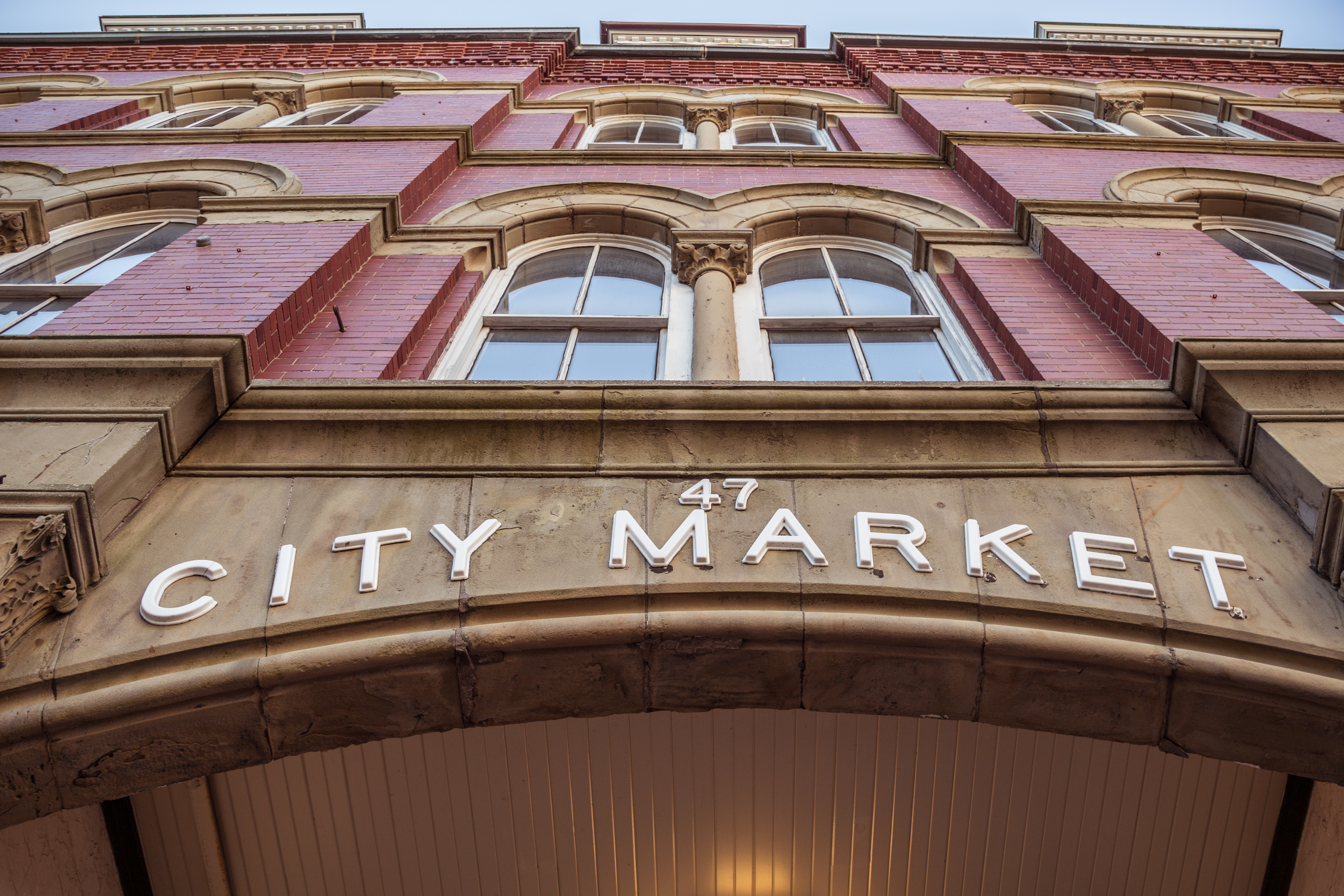
Exterior detail

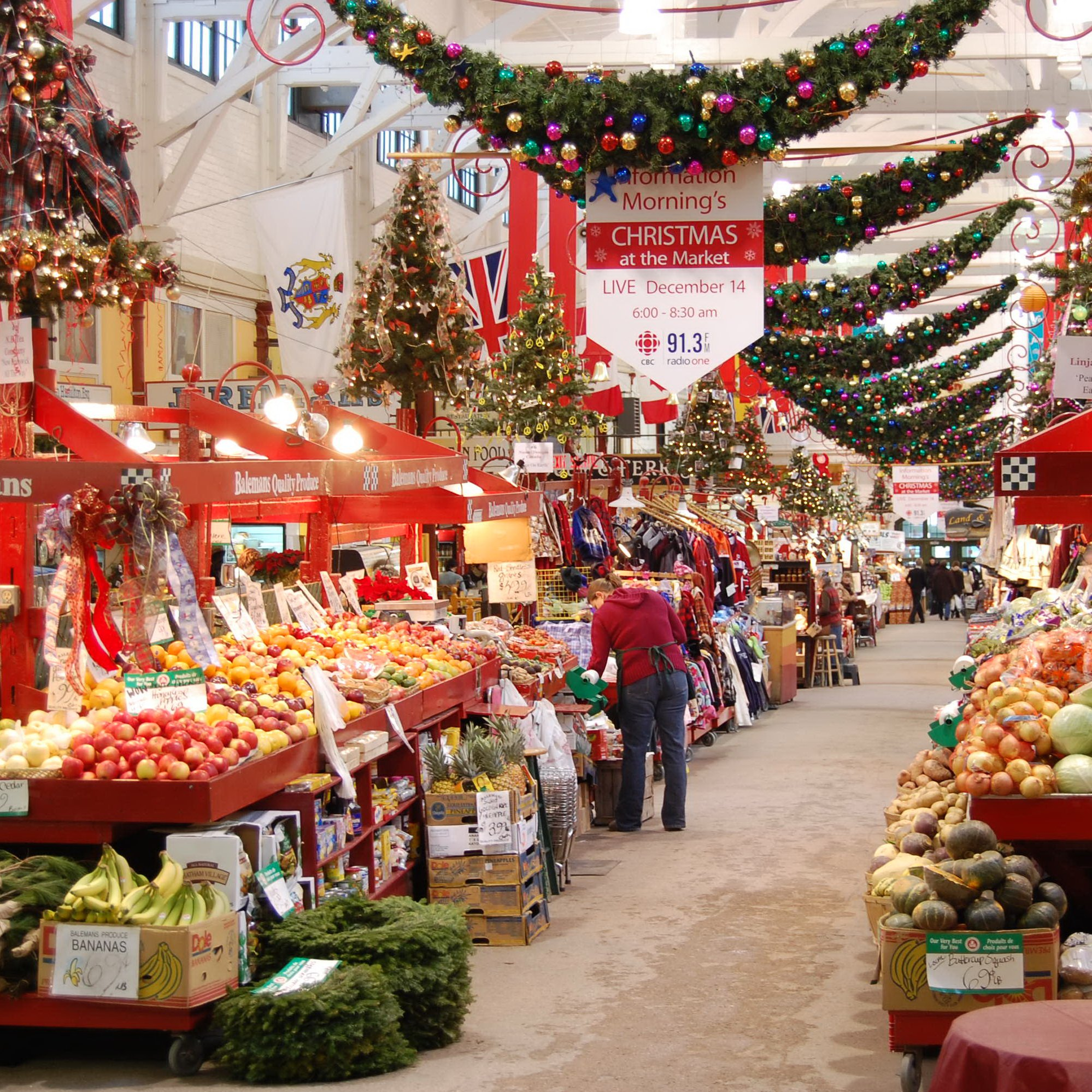
Market at Christmas

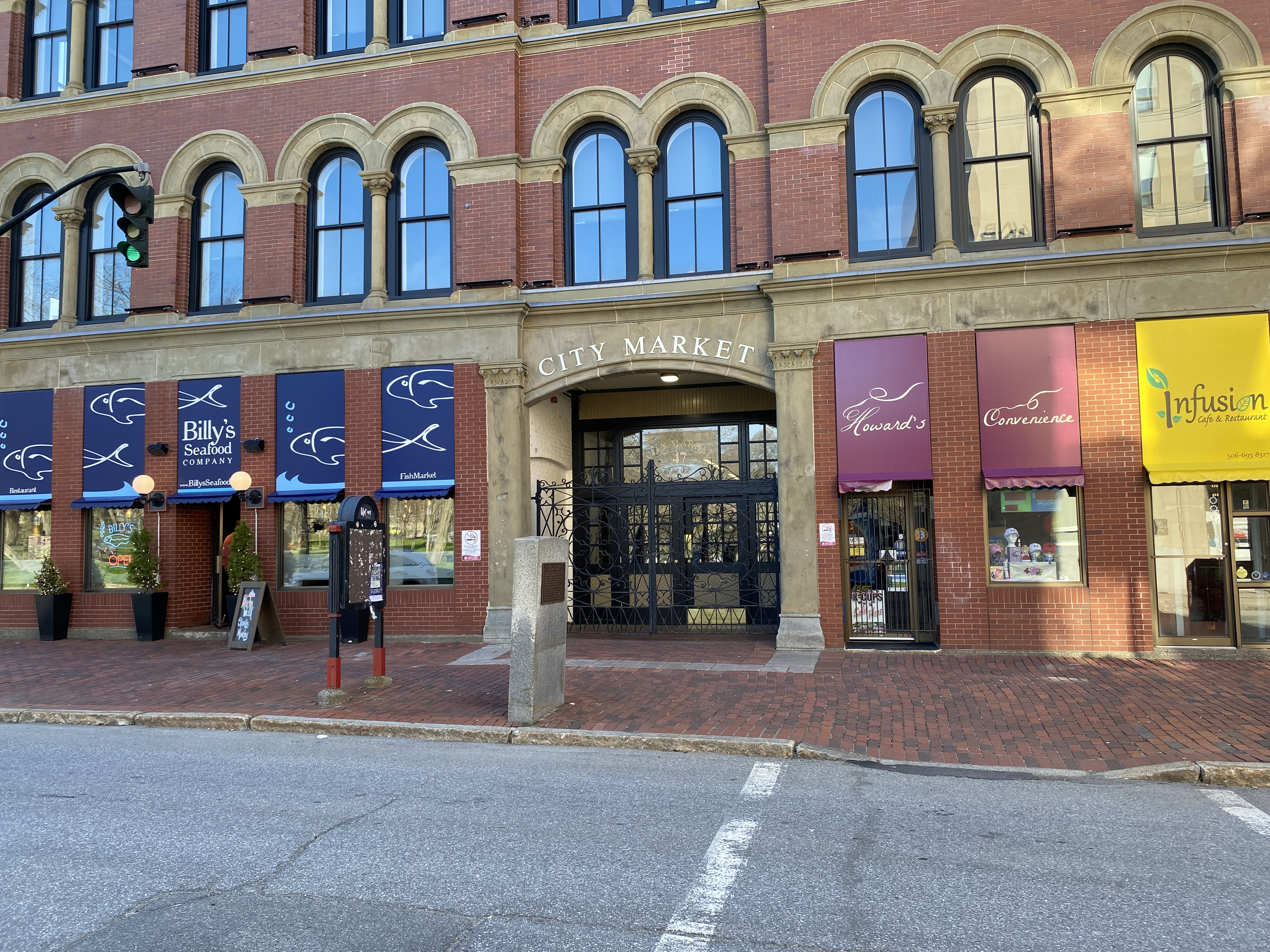
Market Entrance (2023)
