= 7th New Brunswick Legislature =

The 7th New Brunswick Legislative Assembly represented New Brunswick between February 3, 1820, and March, 1820.

The assembly sat at the pleasure of the Governor of New Brunswick George Stracey Smyth.

The speaker of the house was selected as William Botsford.

== Members ==
Electoral District	Name	First elected / previously elected
Charlotte	Colin Campbell	1809
Charlotte	Hugh Mackay	1816
Charlotte	Joseph Porter	1816
Charlotte	John Campbell	1819
Kings	David B. Wetmore	1816
Kings	Samuel Freeze	1819
Northumberland	Richard Simonds	1816
Northumberland	Joseph Saunders	1819
Queens	Samuel Scovil	1816
Queens	Richard Yeamans	1816
Saint John City	Stephen Humbert	1809
Saint John City	Harry Peters	1816
Saint John County	Hugh Johnston	1802
Saint John County	John Ward	1809
Saint John County	Thomas Millidge	1816
Saint John County	Zalmon Wheeler	1819
Sunbury	Elijah Miles	1816
Sunbury	James Taylor	1819
Westmorland	William Botsford	1813
Westmorland	James Easterbrooks	1802
Westmorland	Rufus Smith	1816
Westmorland	Joseph Crandall	1819
York	Peter Fraser	1809
York	John Allen	1809
York	Stair Agnew	1796
York	John Dow	1816

Preceded by 6th New Brunswick Legislature	Legislative Assemblies of New Brunswick; 1820	Succeeded by 8th New Brunswick Legislature
