= 8th New Brunswick Legislature =

The 8th New Brunswick Legislative Assembly represented New Brunswick between January 30, 1821, and 1827.

The assembly sat at the pleasure of the Lieutenant Governor of New Brunswick George S. Smyth. Howard Douglas became lieutenant governor in 1824.

The speaker of the house was selected as William Botsford. In 1824, after Botsford was appointed a judge, Ward Chipman, Jr. was elected speaker. Harry Peters succeeded Chipman as speaker in 1826.

== Members ==
Electoral District	Name	First elected / previously elected
Charlotte	Hugh Mackay	1816
Charlotte	John Campbell	1819
Charlotte	Peter Stubs	1820
Charlotte	Joseph N. Clarke	1820
Kings	John Cougle Vail	1820
Kings	David B. Wetmore	1816
Northumberland	Richard Simonds	1816
Northumberland	Hugh Munro	1820
Queens	Samuel Scovil	1816
Queens	William Peters	1820
Saint John City	Hugh Johnston, Jr.	1820
Saint John City	Harry Peters	1816
Saint John County	Ward Chipman (Note: appointed judge)	1820
Saint John County	Andrew S. Ritchie	1820
Saint John County	John McNeil Wilmot	1820
Saint John County	Charles Simonds	1820
Saint John County	Robert Parker (1826)	1826
Sunbury	Elijah Miles	1816
Sunbury	Amos Perley (Note: died in 1822)	1820
Sunbury	William Wilmot (1824)	1824
Westmorland	William Botsford	1813
Westmorland	Rufus Smith	1816
Westmorland	Joseph Crandall (Note: declared ineligible because he was a preacher)	1819
Westmorland	Benjamin Wilson	1820
Westmorland	Malcolm Wilmot (1823)	1823
Westmorland	William Crane (1824)	1824
York	Peter Fraser	1809
York	John Allen	1809
York	John Dow	1816
York	Stair Agnew (Note: died in 1821)	1796
York	William Taylor (1822)	1822

== Notes ==
Preceded by 7th New Brunswick Legislature	Legislative Assemblies of New Brunswick; 1821–1827	Succeeded by 9th New Brunswick Legislature
