= 6th New Brunswick Legislature =

The 6th New Brunswick Legislative Assembly represented New Brunswick between February 4, 1817, and 1819.

The assembly sat at the pleasure of colonial administrator Harris William Hailes. George Stracey Smyth became Governor of New Brunswick in July 1817.

The speaker of the house was selected as William Botsford.

== Members ==
Electoral District	Name	First elected / previously elected
Charlotte	Colin Campbell	1809
Charlotte	Hugh Mackay	1816
Charlotte	Robert Pagan	1786
Charlotte	Joseph Porter	1816
Kings	James Brittain	1816
Kings	David B. Wetmore	1816
Northumberland	James Fraser	1795
Northumberland	Richard Simonds	1816
Queens	Samuel Scovil	1816
Queens	Richard Yeamans	1816
Saint John City	Stephen Humbert	1809
Saint John City	Harry Peters	1816
Saint John County	Hugh Johnston	1802
Saint John County	John Ward	1809
Saint John County	Thomas Millidge	1816
Saint John County	Craven Calverly	1816
Sunbury	Elijah Miles	1816
Sunbury	William Wilmot	1816
Westmorland	William Botsford	1813
Westmorland	James Easterbrooks	1802
Westmorland	John Chapman	1809
Westmorland	Rufus Smith	1816
York	Peter Fraser	1809
York	John Allen	1809
York	Stair Agnew	1796
York	John Dow	1816

Preceded by 5th New Brunswick Legislature	Legislative Assemblies of New Brunswick; 1817–1819	Succeeded by 7th New Brunswick Legislature
