= 9th New Brunswick Legislature =

The 9th New Brunswick Legislative Assembly represented New Brunswick between February 14, 1828, and 1830.

The assembly sat at the pleasure of the Governor of New Brunswick Howard Douglas.

Richard Simonds was chosen as speaker for the house. He was replaced by his brother Charles in 1829.

== Members ==
Electoral District	Name	First elected / previously elected
Charlotte	Colin Campbell	1809, 1827
Charlotte	Thomas Wyer	1827
Charlotte	Joseph N. Clarke (Note: election appealed)	1820
Charlotte	Hugh Mackay	1816
Charlotte	Patrick Clinch (1828)	1828
Charlotte	Joseph N. Clarke (1829)	1820, 1829
Gloucester	Hugh Munro	1827
Kent	John W. Weldon	1827
Kings	Samuel Freeze	1819, 1827
Kings	John Humbert	1827
Northumberland	Richard Simonds	1816
Northumberland	Alexander Rankin	1827
Northumberland	Joseph Cunard (1828)	1828
Queens	Harry Peters	1827
Queens	Charles Harrison	1827
Queens	Thomas Gilbert (1828)	1828
Saint John City	Hugh Johnston, Jr.	1820
Saint John City	Gregory Van Horne	1827
Saint John County	John R. Partelow	1827
Saint John County	Charles Simonds	1820
Saint John County	John Ward, Jr.	1827
Saint John County	Robert Parker	1826
Sunbury	Thomas O. Miles	1827
Sunbury	George Hayward	1827
Westmorland	Edward B. Chandler	1827
Westmorland	Philip Palmer	1827
Westmorland	William Crane	1824
Westmorland	Robert Scott	1827
York	William Taylor	1822
York	John Allen	1809
York	John Dow	1816
York	Richard Ketchum	1827

== Notes ==
Preceded by 8th New Brunswick Legislature	Legislative Assemblies of New Brunswick; 1827–1830	Succeeded by 10th New Brunswick Legislature
