= 10th New Brunswick Legislature =

The 10th New Brunswick Legislative Assembly represented New Brunswick between February 7, 1831, and 1834.

The assembly sat at the pleasure of the Governor of New Brunswick Sir Archibald Campbell.

William Crane was chosen as speaker for the house.

== Members ==
Electoral District	Name	First elected / previously elected
Charlotte	James Brown	1830
Charlotte	Patrick Clinch	1830
Charlotte	George S. Hill	1830
Charlotte	Thomas Wyer	1827
Gloucester	William End	1830
Kent	John W. Weldon	1827
Kings	John Humbert	1827
Kings	John C. Vail	1820, 1830
Northumberland	Joseph Cunard (Note: resigned)	1828
Northumberland	Alexander Rankin	1827
Northumberland	John Ambrose Street (1833)	1833
Queens	Charles Harrison	1827
Queens	Thomas Gilbert	1828
Saint John City	Thomas Barlow	1830
Saint John City	William B. Kinnear	1830
Saint John County	Charles Simonds	1820
Saint John County	Stephen Humbert	1830
Saint John County	John R. Partelow	1827
Saint John County	John Ward, Jr.	1827
Sunbury	George Hayward	1827
Sunbury	Thomas O. Miles	1827
Westmorland	Edward B. Chandler	1827
Westmorland	William Crane	1824
Westmorland	Rufus Smith	1830
Westmorland	Robert Scott	1827
York	John Allen	1809
York	Jedediah Slason	1830
York	John Dow (Note: died in 1832)	1816
York	William Taylor	1822
York	Jeremiah Connell (1832)	1832
York	James Taylor (1833)	1833

== Notes ==
Preceded by 9th New Brunswick Legislature	Legislative Assemblies of New Brunswick; 1831–1834	Succeeded by 11th New Brunswick Legislature
