= Sunbury (provincial electoral district, 1785–1973) =

Defunct provincial electoral district in New Brunswick, Canada

Sunbury (1785–1973)
New Brunswick electoral district

Defunct provincial electoral district
- Legislature: Legislative Assembly of New Brunswick
- District created: 1785
- District abolished: 1973
- First contested: 1785
- Last contested: 1970

Sunbury was a provincial electoral district in New Brunswick, Canada. It was abolished in 1973 as New Brunswick moved from bloc voting to a single-member first past the post system. It was dissolved into the new ridings of Sunbury and Oromocto.

== Members of the Legislative Assembly ==
Legislature	Years	Member	Party	Member	Party
1st	1786 – 1792	William Hubbard	Independent	Richard Vandeburg	Independent
2nd	1793 – 1795	John Agnew	Independent	James Glenie	Independent
3rd	1795 – 1802	Samuel Denny Street	Independent	James Glenie	Independent
4th	1802 – 1809	Elijah Miles	Independent	James Glenie	Independent
5th	1809 – 1816	Samuel Denny Street	Independent	James Taylor	Independent
6th	1817 – 1819	Elijah Miles	Independent	William Wilmot	Independent
7th	1820	Elijah Miles	Independent	James Taylor	Independent
8th	1821 – 1824	Elijah Miles	Independent	Amos Perley	Independent
8th	1824 – 1827	Elijah Miles	Independent	William Wilmot	Independent
9th	1827 – 1830	Thomas O. Miles	Independent	George Hayward	Independent
10th	1831 – 1834	Thomas O. Miles	Independent	George Hayward	Independent
11th	1835 – 1837	Thomas O. Miles	Independent	George Hayward Jr.	Independent
12th	1837 – 1842	Henry T. Partelow	Independent	George Hayward Jr.	Independent
13th	1843 – 1846	William Scoullar	Independent	Whitehead S. Barker	Independent
14th	1847 – 1850	George Hayward	Independent	Thomas O. Miles	Independent
15th	1851 – 1854	George Hayward	Independent	William Scoullar	Independent
16th	1854 – 1856	George Hayward	Independent	Enoch Lunt	Independent
17th	1856 – 1857	William E. Perley	Liberal-Conservative	David Tapley	Independent
18th	1857 – 1861	William E. Perley	Liberal-Conservative	David Tapley	Independent
19th	1862 – 1865	William E. Perley	Liberal-Conservative	John Glasier	Liberal
20th	1865 – 1866	William E. Perley	Liberal-Conservative	John Glasier	Liberal
21st	1866 – 1868	William E. Perley	Liberal-Conservative	John Glasier	Liberal
21st	1868 – 1870	William E. Perley	Liberal-Conservative	John S. Covert	Liberal
22nd	1870 – 1874	Archibald Harrison	Liberal	John S. Covert	Liberal
23rd	1875 – 1878	William E. Perley	Liberal-Conservative	John S. Covert	Liberal
24th	1879 – 1881	William E. Perley	Liberal-Conservative	John S. Covert	Liberal
24th	1881 – 1882	William E. Perley	Liberal-Conservative	James S. White	Independent
25th	1883	William E. Perley	Liberal-Conservative	George A. Sterling	Liberal
25th	1883 – 1886	William E. Perley	Liberal-Conservative	Arthur Glasier	Liberal
26th	1886 – 1890	Charles B. Harrison	Liberal	Arthur Glasier	Liberal
27th	1890 – 1892	Charles B. Harrison	Liberal	William E. Perley	Liberal-Conservative
28th	1892 – 1895	Charles B. Harrison	Liberal	William E. Perley	Liberal-Conservative
29th	1896 – 1899	Charles B. Harrison	Liberal	David Morrow	Independent
30th	1899 – 1903	Parker Glasier	Conservative	John Douglas Hazen	Conservative
31st	1903 – 1908	Parker Glasier	Conservative	John Douglas Hazen	Conservative
32nd	1908 – 1911	Parker Glasier	Conservative	John Douglas Hazen	Conservative
32nd	1911 – 1912	Parker Glasier	Conservative	George A. Perley	Independent
33rd	1912 – 1917	Parker Glasier	Conservative	George A. Perley	Independent
34th	1917 – 1920	David W. Mersereau	Liberal	Robert H. Smith	Liberal
35th	1921 – 1925	David W. Mersereau	Liberal	Robert H. Smith	Liberal
36th	1925 – 1930	Allan D. Taylor	Conservative	Ewart C. Atkinson	Conservative
37th	1931 – 1935	Allan D. Taylor	Conservative	Ewart C. Atkinson	Conservative
38th	1935 – 1939	Gabriel F. Smith	Liberal	Walter C. Lawson	Liberal
39th	1939 – 1944	Frederic McGrand	Liberal	Walter C. Lawson	Liberal
40th	1944 – 1948	Frederic McGrand	Liberal	Gordon R. Lawson	Liberal
41st	1948 – 1952	Frederic McGrand	Liberal	Gordon R. Lawson	Liberal
42nd	1952 – 1956	Paul Fearon	Progressive Conservative	Paul Mersereau	Progressive Conservative
43rd	1957 – 1960	Paul Fearon	Progressive Conservative	Paul Mersereau	Progressive Conservative
44th	1960 – 1963	R. Lee MacFarlane	Liberal	William R. Duffie	Liberal
45th	1963 – 1967	R. Lee MacFarlane	Liberal	William R. Duffie	Liberal
46th	1967 – 1970	Douglas A. Flower	Liberal	William R. Duffie	Liberal
47th	1970 – 1974	Reginald W. Mabey	Progressive Conservative	Horace Smith	Progressive Conservative
Riding dissolved into Oromocto and Sunbury (1974–1994)

== Election results ==
1970 New Brunswick general election
Party	Candidate	Votes	Elected
Progressive Conservative	Reginald W. Mabey	4,209	✓
Progressive Conservative	Horace Smith	4,110	✓
Liberal	William R. Duffie	3,427	
Liberal	Douglas Flower	2,902	
New Democratic	William Robert Ross	226	
New Democratic	Lawrence John Lamont	205	

1967 New Brunswick general election
Party	Candidate	Votes	Elected
Liberal	William R. Duffie	4,653	✓
Liberal	Douglas A. Flower	3,980	✓
Progressive Conservative	? Mockler	3,341	
Progressive Conservative	? Fearon	3,152	

== See also ==
- List of New Brunswick provincial electoral districts
- Canadian provincial electoral districts
