= 5th New Brunswick Legislature =

The 5th New Brunswick Legislative Assembly represented New Brunswick between January 27, 1810, and 1816.

The assembly sat at the pleasure of the Governor of New Brunswick Thomas Carleton. Carleton having left the province in 1805, the colony was actually governed by a series of colonial administrators during this period.

The speaker of the house was selected as Amos Botsford. After Botsford's passing in 1813, John Robinson was appointed speaker.

== Members ==
Electoral District	Name	First elected / previously elected
Charlotte	Robert Pagan	1786
Charlotte	John Dunn	1809
Charlotte	Donald McDonald	1809
Charlotte	Colin Campbell	1809
Kings	John Coffin (Note: unseated after an appeal)	1786
Kings	George Pitfield	1809
Kings	Jasper Belding (1810)	1810
Kings	George Leonard (1810)	1802, 1810
Northumberland	James Fraser	1795
Northumberland	Alexander Taylor	1802
Queens	James Peters	1793
Queens	John Yeamans	1786
Saint John City	John Garrison	1809
Saint John City	Stephen Humbert	1809
Saint John City	John Robinson (1810)	1810
Saint John County	William Pagan	1786
Saint John County	Hugh Johnston	1802
Saint John County	John Ward	1809
Saint John County	Thomas Wetmore	1809
Sunbury	Samuel Denny Street	1809
Sunbury	James Taylor	1809
Westmorland	Amos Botsford (Note: died in 1812)	1786
Westmorland	Titus Knapp	1803
Westmorland	James Easterbrooks	1802
Westmorland	John Chapman	1809
Westmorland	William Botsford (1813)	1813
York	Peter Fraser	1809
York	John Allen	1809
York	Stair Agnew	1796
York	Duncan McLeod	1809
York	John Murray Bliss (1814)	1814

== Notes ==
Preceded by 4th New Brunswick Legislature	Legislative Assemblies of New Brunswick; 1809–1816	Succeeded by 6th New Brunswick Legislature
