= Big Potato Man =

Potato sculpture in New Brunswick, Canada

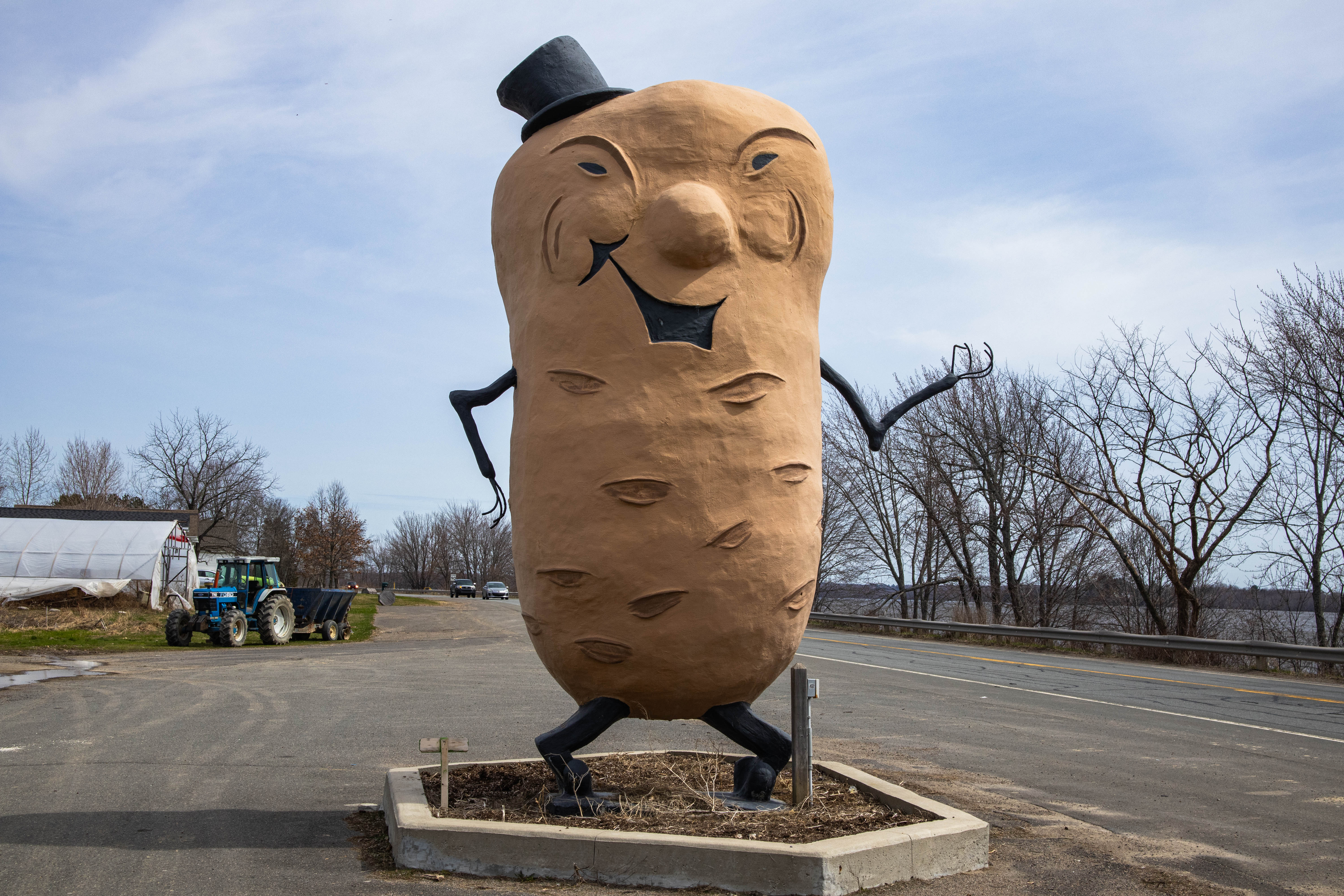
- Interactive map of Big Potato Man
- Location: Maugerville, New Brunswick, Canada
- Coordinates: 45.887798°N 66.524637°W
- Designer: Winston Bronnum
- Type: Potato sculpture
- Material: concrete
- Height: 6.1 metres (20 ft)
- Opening date: 1969

Big Potato Man is a sculpture of a large potato man located along Route 105 in Maugerville, New Brunswick, Canada. Constructed in 1969 by Winston Bronnum, Big Potato Man serves as a form of roadside advertisement for the adjacent farming business.

== Description ==
Big Potato Man is a large potato sculpture in Maugerville, New Brunswick. Made using concrete, it stands at a height of 20 feet (6.1 m) with a thickness of 3 feet (0.91 m). The sculpture has two legs, arms resembling twigs, a smiling face, and sports a black top hat. Big Potato Man was created in 1969 by sculptor Winston Bronnum for Karl Harvey, as a means to advertise the roadside stand for his family farming business.

Big Potato Man stands along Route 105, which was formerly part of the Trans-Canada Highway. Since 1969, it has stood at the front of a farming business.

== History ==
=== Background ===
In 1921, J. H. Harvey bought a farm in Maugerville, a small community along the Saint John River between Fredericton and Oromocto. The Harvey family ran a business, known then as Harvey's, selling vegetables at their roadside stand.

=== Big Potato Man ===
In 1968, Karl Harvey, who ran the family farming business at the time, sought the creation for a large potato sculpture, seeking a creative method to advertise his stand. In 1969, Karl had Big Potato Man built. Created by sculptor Winston Bronnum using concrete, the sculpture measured 20 feet (6.1 m) high and had a thickness of 3 feet. Big Potato Man proved successful for the business, with Gordon (Buzz) Harvey, Karl's son, later saying "he doubled our business within three to four years pretty well." Following Karl Harvey's death in 1996, the $1,500 Karl Harvey Memorial Scholarship was posthumously created in his honour. On March 24, 1999, the sculpture was nearly destroyed when a fire struck the business.

In November 2015, the farm and home of Big Potato Man, then known as Harvey's Big Potato farm, was put up for sale. Silver Valley Farms began leasing the farm in 2016, and would take ownership of the establishment in September 2021. In April 2022, Silver Valley Farms sought repairs for Big Potato Man, which was at risk of collapsing. However, repair costs quoted at CA$10,000 prompted the creation of a GoFundMe campaign. It raised over CA$4,600 within the first 48 hours, and successfully reached its goal within nearly two weeks.

== See also ==
- The World's Largest Lobster, another sculpture made by Bronnum
