= Millidge =

Millidge may refer to:

- Millidge, Ontario, Canada
- Millidge (surname), a surname of British Isles origin

== See also ==
- Milledge (disambiguation)
