= Winston Bronnum =

Canadian artist and sculptor (1929-1991)

Winston Atwood Bronnum
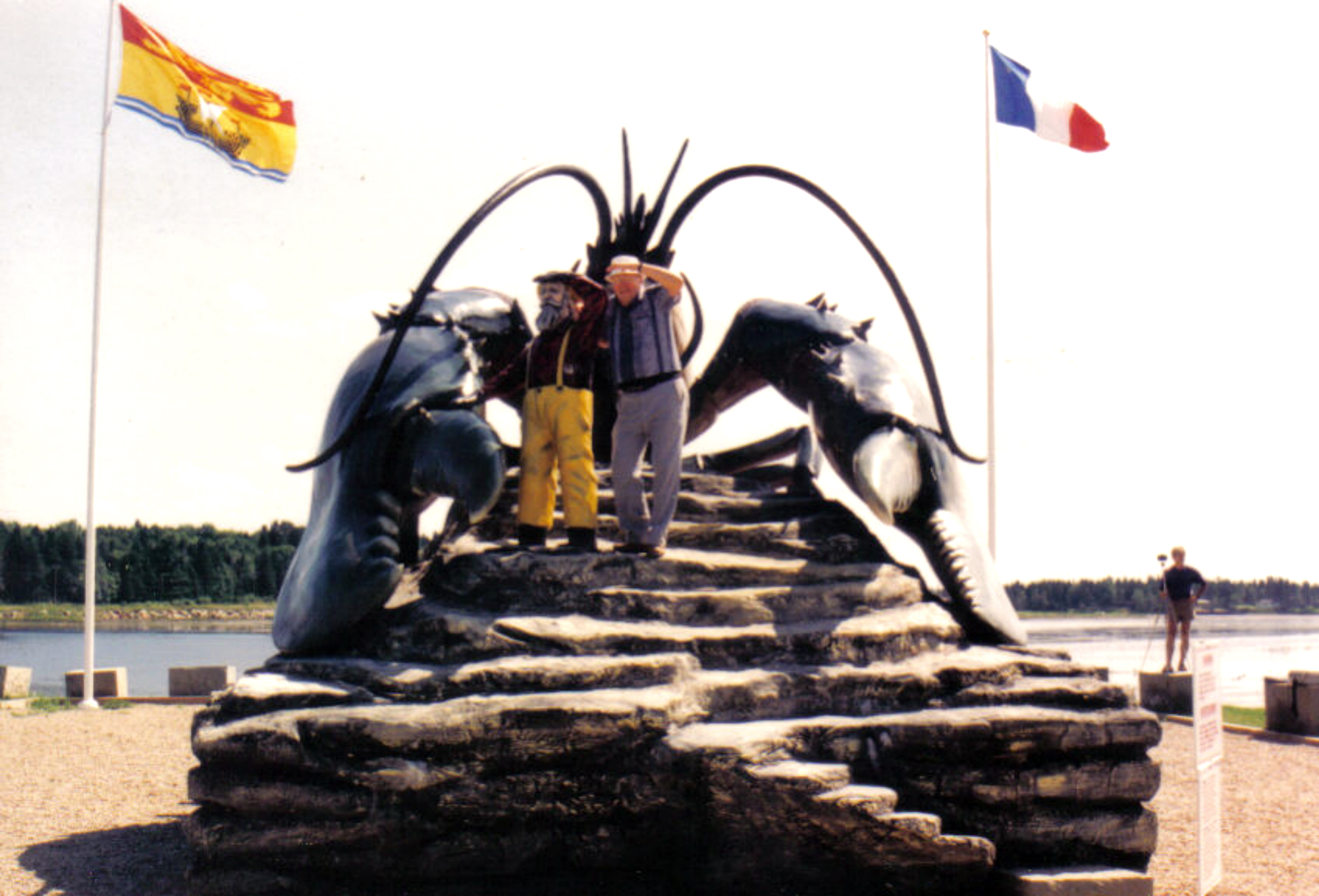
- Winston Bronnum with his The World's Largest Lobster sculpture
- Born: March 21, 1929; New Denmark, New Brunswick
- Died: September 10, 1991 (aged 62); Sussex, New Brunswick
- Notable work: The World's Largest Lobster, Jumbo the Elephant

Winston Bronnum (1929-1991) was a self-taught Dano-Canadian nature artist, sculptor and entrepreneur known for his large concrete animal sculptures which adorn Canadian roadsides. He founded and operated the defunct Animaland Park which showcased a number of his works and served as his workshop. He worked on bridges and hydro dams early on which helped when designing and building the structures. His family name was originally spelled Brønnum.

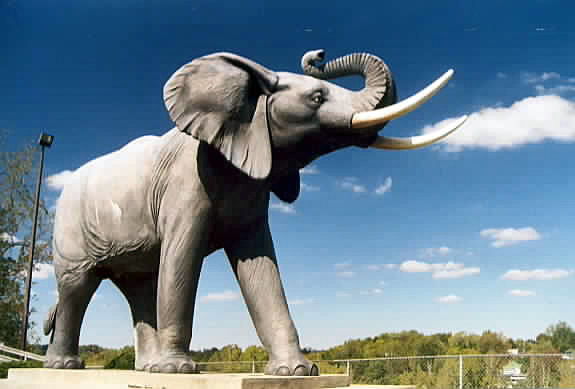
Jumbo the Elephant, 1985

== Notable works ==
- The Cow Bay Moose, Cow Bay, Nova Scotia, 1959
- Gladstone Horse, Saint John, New Brunswick, 1967
- Broken Down Race Horse (Blowhard), Penobsquis, New Brunswick, 1967
- Big Potato Man, Maugerville, New Brunswick, 1969
- Jumbo the Elephant, St. Thomas, Ontario, 1985
- The World's Largest Lobster, Shediac, New Brunswick, 1990
