= Millidge (surname) =

Millidge is a surname of British origin, and may refer to:

- A. F. Millidge (1914–2012), British arachnologist
- Gary Spencer Millidge (1961 -), British comic book creator
- Thomas Millidge (circa 1735–1816), Canadian politician
- Thomas Millidge, Jr. (1776–1838), Canadian politician
