= Hills Island (New Brunswick) =

Island in New Brunswick, Canada

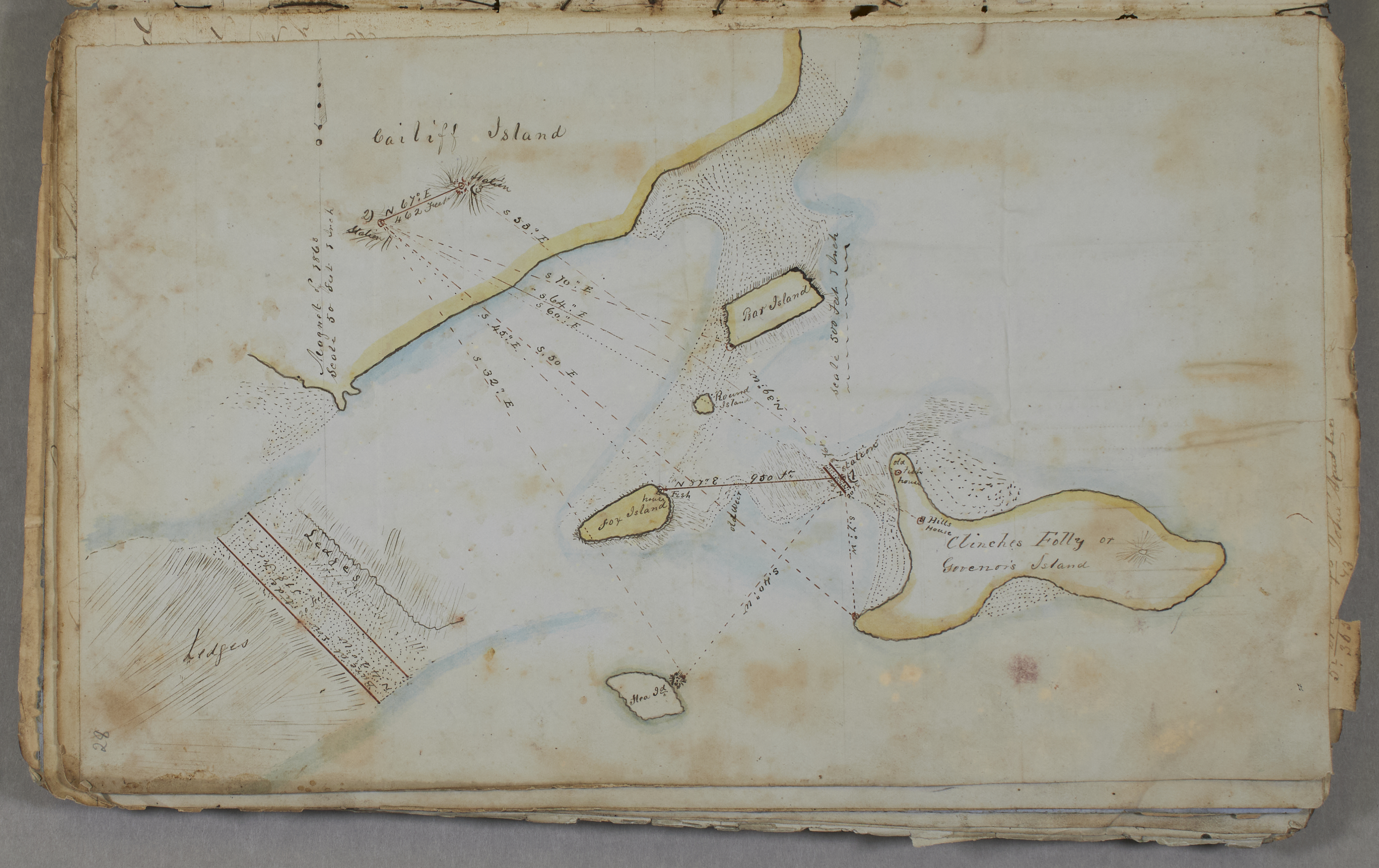
- A survey from the 1860s shows Hills Island, labeled as Clinch's Folly with the Hills' House on it.
- Interactive map of Hills Island

Geography
- Location: Bay of Fundy
- Coordinates: 45°2′42″N 66°49′32″W
- Highest elevation: 45 m (148 ft)

Administration
- Canada
- Province: New Brunswick
- County: Charlotte
- Parish: Saint George Parish

Hills Island (formerly Governor's Island, Clinch's Folly, McCann Island) is an island in the Saint George Parish of Charlotte County, New Brunswick, Canada in the Bay of Fundy. It is the largest and easternmost of the islands that separate Letang Harbour and Bliss Harbour.

Ganong wrote that the name Clinch's Folly was in use from 1783, the same year Peter Clinch received his land grant in Saint George. Ganong notes the name "Governor's Island" is "No doubt because [of] a government military reservation".

In 2001, Hills Island Salmon Ltd, based out of Beaver Harbour, was awarded a $397,142 grant.

In 2024 it was listed for private sale, noting a 3-bedroom off-grid cottage with solar power with an outbuilding.
