= Jumbo the Elephant (Bronnum) =

Statue in St. Thomas, Ontario, Canada

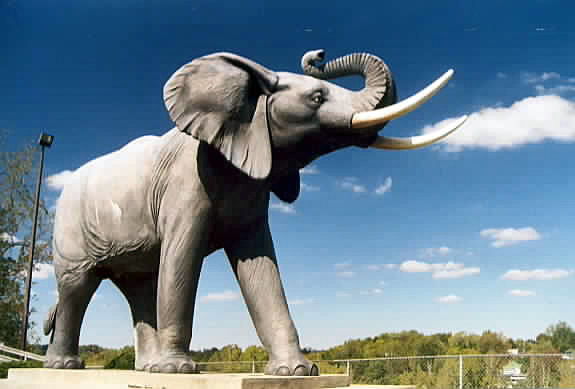
- Artist: Winston Bronnum
- Year: 1985
- Type: Concrete statue
- Location: St. Thomas, Ontario; 42°46′44″N 81°12′29″W
- Owner: City of St. Thomas

Jumbo the Elephant is a concrete and reinforced steel statue by Canadian artist Winston Bronnum. The statue was commissioned by the city of St. Thomas, Ontario to mark the 100th anniversary of the death of Jumbo, a circus elephant that was killed in the community after being struck by a train. The city funded the $70,000 sculpture in part with the sale of Indiana Jones-style hats and commemorative coins. The statue was constructed at Bronnum's Animaland Park in Sussex, New Brunswick and transported 1,722 kilometres to St. Thomas. For ease of transport the upper legs and body were poured separately from the base and lower legs. The statue weighs 38 tonnes, while the base weighs 100 tonnes.
