= Jadis (disambiguation) =

Jadis is the name of the White Witch in C. S. Lewis's Narnia Chronicles.

Jadis may also refer to:

- Jadis (band), British neo-progressive rock group
- Jadis, Iran
- Jadis Township, Roseau County, Minnesota, a township in Minnesota, United States
- Jadis (The Walking Dead), a character on the television series The Walking Dead
- Jordan Antiquities Database and Information System (JADIS), computer database of archaeological sites in Jordan
- Jadis, a producer of High-end audio tube amplifiers (Villedubert, France)

== People with the surname Jadis ==
- Charles Newland Godfrey Jadis (1730–1788), Canadian naval officer and merchant
