= Doug Harrison =

Canadian politician

Member of the Legislative Assembly of New Brunswick
- In office 1987–1991
- Preceded by: Horace Smith
- Succeeded by: Max White
- Constituency: Sunbury

Personal details
- Born: October 22, 1949 (age 76)
- Party: New Brunswick Liberal Association
- Spouse: Mary
- Children: 3
- Occupation: journalist

Douglas Harrison (born October 22, 1949) is a former Canadian politician. He served in the Legislative Assembly of New Brunswick from 1987 to 1991 as a Liberal member from the constituency of Sunbury.
