= Cow Bay, Nova Scotia =

Cow Bay
- Community
- Location within Nova Scotia
- Coordinates: 44°37′15″N 63°25′32″W
- Country: Canada
- Province: Nova Scotia
- Municipality: Halifax Regional Municipality
- Community council: Harbour East - Marine Drive Community Council
- District: 3 - Dartmouth South - Eastern Passage
- Founded: 1763

Area
  - Land: 5.79 km^{2} (2.24 sq mi)
- Highest elevation: 42 m (138 ft)
- Lowest elevation: 0 m (0 ft)

Population (2021)
  - Total: 1,224
  - Density: 211/km^{2} (550/sq mi)
- Time zone: UTC-4 (AST)
  - Summer (DST): UTC-3 (ADT)
- Canadian Postal code: B3G
- Area code: 902
- Canadian Census Tract: 0121.03
- GNBC Code: CAIAU
- Website: bigthings.ca/scotia/cowbay.html
- Part of a series about Places in Nova Scotia

Cow Bay is an unincorporated rural community within Halifax Regional Municipality Nova Scotia on the Eastern Shore on Route 322 along the Marine Drive scenic route.

== Demographics ==
In the 2021 Census of Population conducted by Statistics Canada, Cow Bay had a population of 1,224 living in 455 of its 474 total private dwellings, a change of −2.6% from its 2016 population of 1,257. With a land area of 5.79 km^{2} (2.24 sq mi), it had a population density of 211.4/km^{2} (547.5/sq mi) in 2021.

== Geography and attractions ==
Besides being an ocean community, Cow Bay also has 3 lakes, Bissett Lake, Cow Bay Lake, and Car Wash Lake. The Cow Bay River cuts through the centre of the community which consists of a number of small waterfalls before it enters Cow Bay Lake. Cow Bay is also famous for its jogging/walking/bicycle trails, the Salt Marsh Trail and Shearwater Flyer trail which follow an abandoned rail line known as the Dartmouth Eastern Railway. It is also unique in the Halifax region because horses are a common sight in the community because of the significant number of farms. Daily wildlife sightings in the community are pheasants, deer, bobcats, rabbits, bear, plus wide and varied species of birds. Cow Bay's motto is "Cow Bay Attracting Visitors Since 1773". In 1959 a large concrete moose statue by Winston Bronnum was constructed and still remains a landmark. Cow Bay is also famous for the annual 25 km "Moose Run", part of a running series in Nova Scotia which has had a growing number of participants because of the scenic views the run offers.

According to Magen Hudak of Cow Bay, "Silver Sands Beach [...] has been an integral landmark, for many generations, for locals and non-locals, alike. Known as Cow Bay Beach until the early 1920s when it assumed its present name, Silver Sands was once touted as one of the Halifax area's most popular beaches. A "long stretch of fine white sand," it was flanked by a tree-lined picnic area, situated against a lake. It boasted various sundry amenities - including an open concept pavilion, in the early decades of the twentieth century, and by midcentury, it was equipped with modern style beach canteens and a dancehall. In 1893, local history essayist, Mary Jane Katzmann, praised the small rural community of Cow Bay as "a spot where Nature with her fairest and sweetest attractions [was] always to be found," further illustrating its prestige as a favourite summer resort, "not only for picnic parties, but also for those who [enjoyed] a few days or weeks by the sea." Lying approximately fifteen kilometers east of Dartmouth, many would make the journey there via horse and wagon – or even via steamboat in the late nineteenth century- before the days of the automobile, in order to escape the "dinginess of a garrisoned city" [Halifax]. The beach was then known far and wide for its unparalleled beauty, figuring not only in local materials, but within publications in New England, as well. Silver Sands sustained this resort fame for nearly one hundred years - from about 1866 until the mid 1960s."

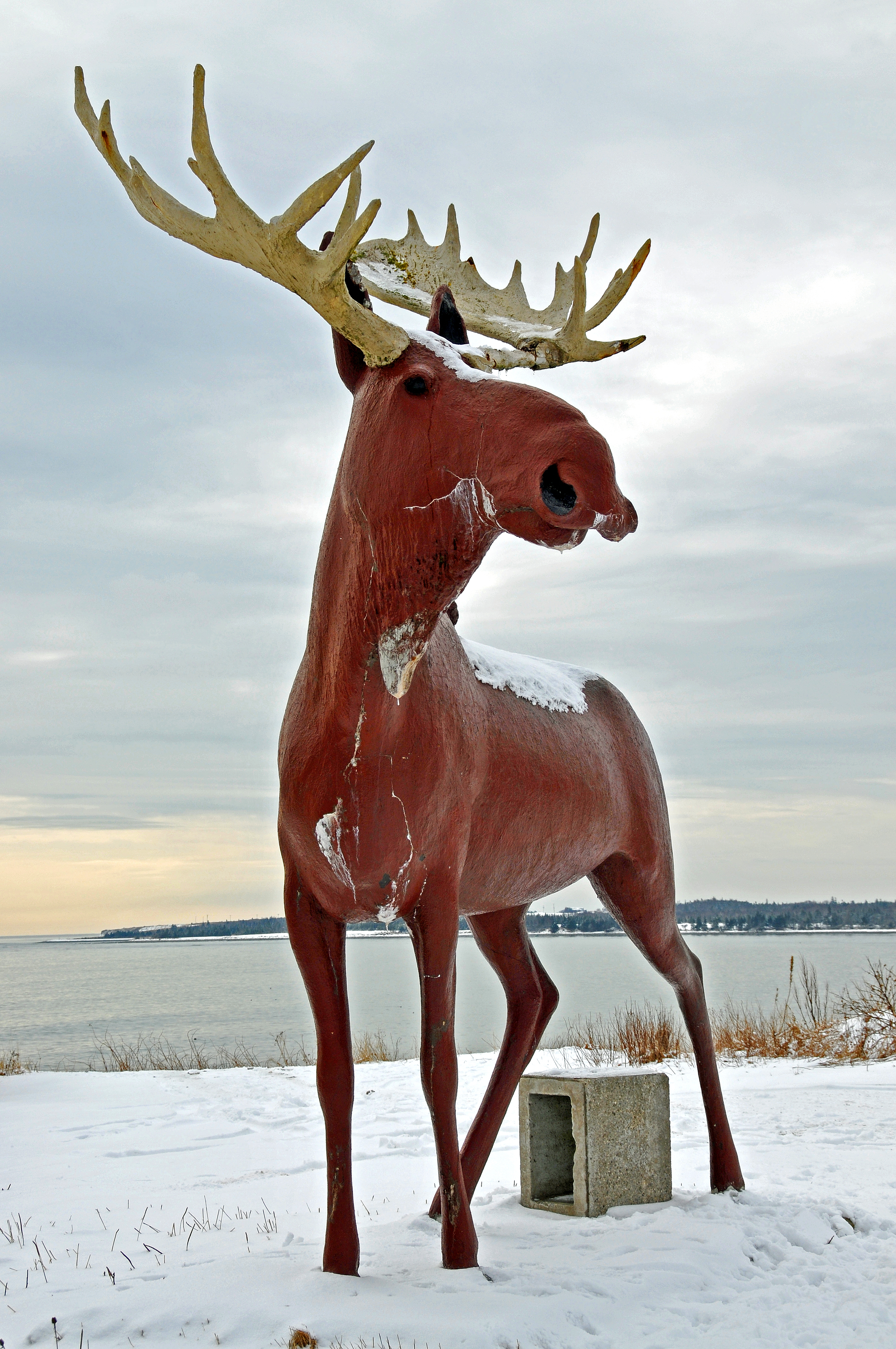
Cow Bay Moose, a 1959 sculpture by Winston Bronnum

The invaluable local history series, known as the 'Hewitt Histories,' written by H.W Hewitt (former historian and contributor to former Dartmouth newspaper, the 'Dartmouth Patriot') help to paint an even earlier historical portrait of the area. In particular, early recreational activity at Cow Bay, features within, 'Hewitt History No.14 [15]: How the Mosers Came into Possession of the Beach – Story of a Wreck' (April 10, 1901). It states that the history of Cow Bay as a beachside destination began 'about thirty five years,' before his time of writing, by Colonel Dawson and Colonel Sinclair, marking the year of its 'founding,' as such, to be approximately 1866. Hewitt writes: 'The history of Cow Bay as a summer resort began about 35 or 40 years ago. Some of the first to go to Cow Bay for pleasure were Colonel Dawson and his son-in-law, Colonel [Sinclair]. They used to have rooms in the house of Daniel Moser, Sr. Colonel Barnaby also rented rooms a few years after. From that time on more and more persons began to come regularly to Cow Bay, so I will say nothing of any except the first two mentioned. Colonel Dawson was a very tall and corpulent man. He served for a short time in the Crimean war. He was very wealthy, and on his return from the Crimea he left England and cam[e] to Dartmouth. […] His son-in-law, Colonel [Sinclair], of the 42nd Regiment, known commonly as the Black Watch Regiment, did not care to leave his wife; so, when the war broke out he sold his commission and came to Dartmouth […] Colonel Dawson and [Sinclair]. Colonel Dawson took a fancy to Cow Bay. He thought that the island in Cow Bay Lake, being completely surrounded by water, belonged to nobody. He camped on the island, and thought it his own. He had a folding canvas canoe and a sailboat, which he used frequently on the lake and outside the beach. He used to put an awning over the boat and sleep in her. To make a long story short both Dawson and [Sinclair] left Dartmouth and Cow Bay about 35 years ago.'

== Community beaches ==
The community consists of two popular beaches, Rainbow Haven Beach, and Silver Sands Beach both are internationally known surfing locations and kayaking locations.

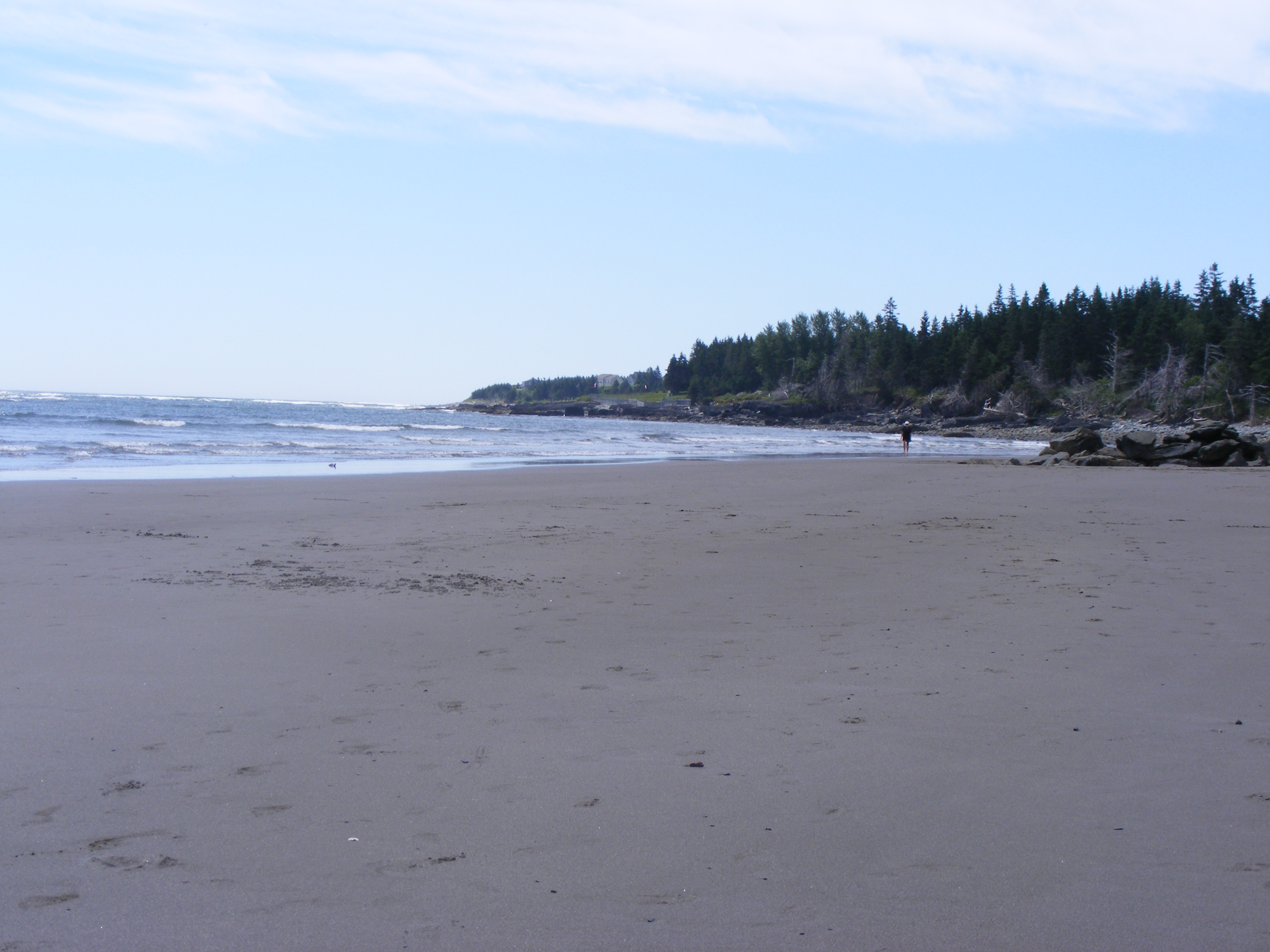
Rainbow Haven Beach, Cow Bay, July 1, 2016

- Rainbow Haven Beach - This is a provincial park that is popular with families looking to have a day of fun at the beach. There is supervised swimming with Lifeguards in summer, this beach has boardwalks, change houses & showers for public use.
- Silver Sands Beach - This park owned by the municipality, but is only accessible via a public easement over private property.

== History ==
The community was named after Robert Cowie who, with Roger Hill, received a land grant in the area in 1763. In the 1840s, the latest known ancestors of Cow Bay are the Myers and the Moshers. The beach which extends for a kilometre and a half was a popular destination for people from Dartmouth area by 1850. In the 1930s, a dance hall and canteen were built. Over time, the Silver Sands Beach was destroyed by the removal of sand for construction of the container piers in Halifax Harbour and to build the runway at CFB Shearwater Airport. Removal of sand left the beaches vulnerable to the erosion of the tides until the Nova Scotia Government decided to step in and pass legislation to protect sand from beaches from being removed.

== Notable residents ==
- Edith Archibald
