= Thomas Leavitt (banker) =

American diplomat (1795–1850)

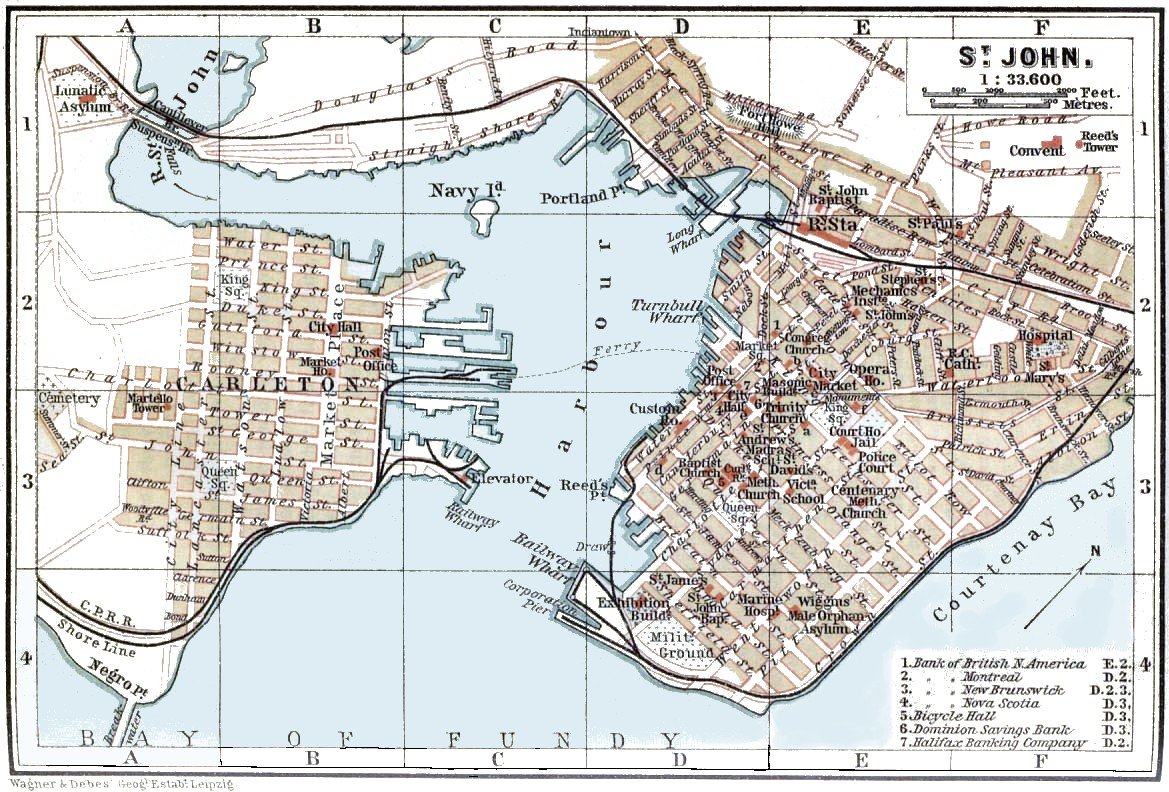
- Map of Saint John, New Brunswick, 1894
- Born: 1795; New Brunswick
- Died: October 24, 1850 (aged 55)
- Occupations: Banker, businessman
- Known for: Founder and president of the Bank of New Brunswick
- Spouse: Mary Ann (née Ketchum)
- Children: 7

Thomas Leavitt (1795–1850) was a Canadian businessman and banker who was the early president of the Bank of New Brunswick in his native Saint John, New Brunswick. Leavitt was also a diplomat, politician and powerful Canadian businessman with interests in the shipping industry.

== Early life and family roots ==
Thomas Leavitt was the descendant of early New Hampshire settlers. His father Jonathan Leavitt (1746–1811) was a mariner who arrived in New Brunswick from New Hampshire in 1764. Capt. Jonathan Leavitt's wife was Hephzibah (Peabody) Leavitt, daughter of Capt. Francis Peabody, a Massachusetts native who came north following the French and Indian War to settle lands he was granted to form a township in New Brunswick.

Capt. Leavitt arrived in New Brunswick in August 1762 aboard ship from Newburyport, Massachusetts, with father-in-law Peabody, as well as James Simmons and James White, for whom he worked as a mariner at the firm of shipowners Simmons, Hazen & White, whose partners he was related to by marriage. (Leavitt and James Simmons and James White had married daughters of Francis Peabody). Jonathan Leavitt had eight sons, including Thomas Leavitt, and two daughters.

The Leavitt family later joined their relations in the shipping business, becoming shipowners, mariners and prominent merchants in Saint John, which following the Revolutionary War had a substantial American Loyalist population. By 1774, mariner Leavitt was actively engaged in shipbuilding, joining forces that year with brother-in-law Samuel Peabody to order construction of one of the earliest schooners built in New Brunswick, the Menaguashe.

Early in his career, mariner Leavitt grew discouraged with his prospects, fearing that New Brunswick would never support a shipping industry like that of Boston or Halifax, Nova Scotia. Jonathan Leavitt and his brother Daniel mulled over moving elsewhere where "there was a larger population and more business", reported The New Brunswick Magazine. Leavitt's brother-in-law and sometime employer James White intervened, telling the two brothers: "Don't be discouraged, boys, keep up a good heart! Why ships will come here from England yet!"

The industry that Jonathan Leavitt pioneered later blossomed, especially after the influx of Loyalists following the Revolutionary War. Capt. Jonathan Leavitt and his brother Capt. Daniel Leavitt were among those who piloted into Saint John's harbor the fleet of vessels carrying thousands of American Loyalists from New York City in 1784. The influx of Loyalists stoked the Saint John economy: it would later rank fourth among shipbuilding cities of the British Empire, earning it the sobriquet of "the Liverpool of North America". Leavitt and his family became recipients of that boom.

At his death in 1811, former ship captain Jonathan Leavitt left a large estate including properties scattered across Saint John and a large tract on the Miramichi River. Leavitt's son Thomas took over the reins of the family business. He was admitted a merchant freeman of Saint John in 1817, and subsequently played a major role in business affairs of New Brunswick.

== Career ==
By the 1840s Leavitt was firmly established as a major player in the region, acting as agent for the Liverpool Association of Underwriters, and for several New York marine insurance companies. Early on Thomas Leavitt obtained a perpetual lease on a harborside lot, allowing him to build his own wharf for his shipping interests as well as charging wharfage fees to other merchants.

By 1835 Leavitt, the son of an American emigrant to Canada, was named United States Consul for Saint John. Leavitt was confirmed by the United States Senate as U.S. Consul in 1835. He served in the post for eight years, until 1845.

Shortly afterwards Thomas Leavitt helped found City Bank in 1837, and subsequently became president of the Bank of New Brunswick after its merger with City Bank.

Leavitt also helped establish the extension of the new Morse Telegraph system to the Maritime Provinces of Canada. He was listed first among incorporators of the New Brunswick Telegraph Company, whose mission was connecting the incipient telegraph line from Maine through New Brunswick to Halifax, Nova Scotia.

== Other interests ==
Aside from his business interests, Leavitt also served as the Worshipful Master of the Freemasons in New Brunswick.

Leavitt was a Church of Scotland Presbyterian, and was active in St. Andrew's Church in Saint John, where he participated in the 1832 attempt by church trustees to wrest control of church finances from the elders. Leavitt was also part of a large group of Saint John Presbyterians who challenged the Church of England’s monopoly on education in the province in the 1830s. The group successfully demanded the appointment of non-Episcopalians to the Madras School Board and to the council of King’s College.

== Death and legacy ==
Thomas Leavitt died in Saint John on October 24, 1850, at the age of 55. Leavitt and his wife Mary Ann (née Ketchum) had four sons and three daughters. The Leavitt family papers, including logbooks for the family's fleet of vessels, family correspondence, bills and promissory notes and other memorabilia, are deposited at the New Brunswick Museum.

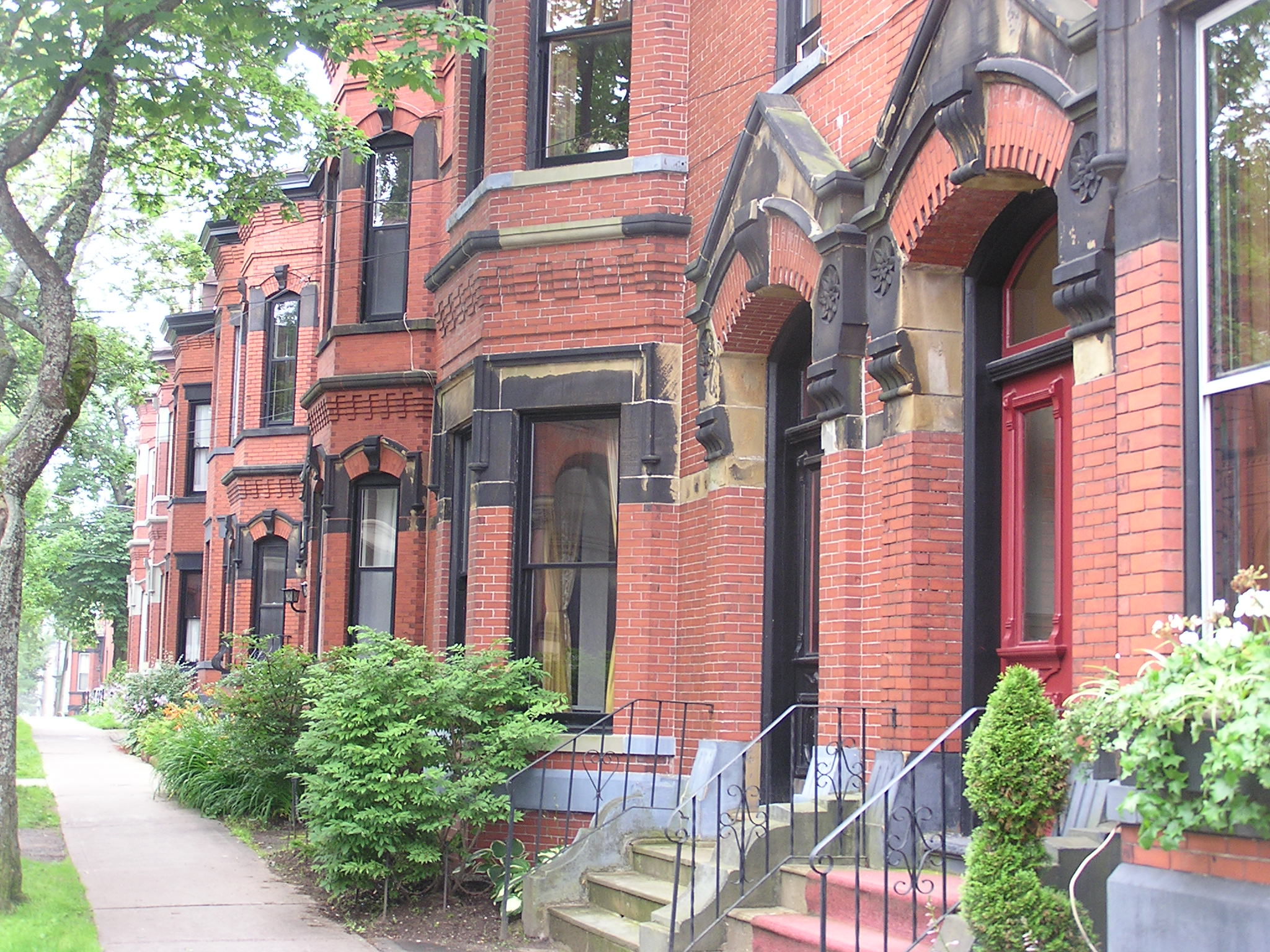
Today's Saint John, New Brunswick

The family's name is pronounced "Lovett" in New Brunswick.

== Sources ==
- Leavitt (Lovett, Lovitt) Family Papers, 1783–1875, New Brunswick Museum, Maritime History Archive
