= Malcolm Wilmot =

Canadian politician

Malcolm Wilmot (1771 – September 7, 1859) was a merchant and political figure in New Brunswick. He represented Westmorland in the Legislative Assembly of New Brunswick from 1823 to 1827.

He was born in Rhode Island, the son of a captain in the British army who served during the American revolution. Wilmot was a lieutenant in the King's New Brunswick Regiment, retiring on half pay when the regiment was disbanded in 1802. He was a general merchant and operated a shipping business at the Bend of Petitcodiac (later Moncton). He married a daughter of John Bentley. He was elected to the assembly in an 1823 by-election held after the election of Joseph Crandall was overturned because he was a preacher. Wilmot died at the Bend of Petitcodiac at the age of 88.
