= Prince Regent (1817 ship) =

UK merchant ship (1817–1823)

History

United Kingdom
- Name: Prince Regent
- Namesake: The Prince Regent
- Launched: 1817, Kings County, New Brunswick
- Fate: Wrecked 2 November 1823

General characteristics
- Tons burthen: 557, or 558 (bm)

Prince Regent was launched in New Brunswick in 1817. She sailed to England and changed her registry, but then unusually, in 1821, her ownership and registry returned to New Brunswick. She was wrecked on the coast of Maine in November 1823.

== Career ==
Prince Regent first appeared in Lloyd's Register (LR) in 1818.

She was registered in Liverpool in 1818.

Year	Master	Owner	Trade	Source & notes
1818	J.Reed (or Reid); G.Stanton	B.Stanton	Liverpool–New Brunswick	LR; damages repaired 1818

In Liverpool her ownership changed. The Register of Shipping gave it as T.Lange, and Lloyd's Register gave it as Ewing & Co.

The Saint John, New Brunswick merchants John Richard Partelow and Hugh Johnston, Sr., purchased Prince Regent and in 1821 transferred her registry back to Saint John.

Year	Master	Owner	Trade	Source & notes
1823	G.Stanton	Bartelow & Co.	Liverpool–Boston	LR; damages repaired 1820 & repairs 1823

== Fate ==
On 2 November 1823, Prince Regent, Stanton, master, while bound from Liverpool for Saint John, was driven ashore and wrecked on Machias Seal Island, in the Bay of Fundy. Her crew was saved. The hull, part of the sails and rigging, along with 120 tons of coal, were sold at auction on November 7.
