= Sunbury (provincial electoral district, 1973–1994) =

Defunct provincial electoral district in New Brunswick, Canada

New Brunswick electoral district

Defunct provincial electoral district
- Legislature: Legislative Assembly of New Brunswick
- District created: 1973
- District abolished: 1994
- First contested: 1974
- Last contested: 1991

Sunbury was a provincial electoral district for the Legislative Assembly of New Brunswick, Canada. This riding was created in the 1973 redistribution when New Brunswick moved to single member districts from Bloc voting. Prior to 1973, two members were elected to represent Sunbury County. The other seat was assigned to the new electoral district of Oromocto.

In the 1994 redistribution, this district was redistributed into the new ridings of Grand Lake and New Maryland.

== Members of the Legislative Assembly ==
| Assembly | Years | Member | Party |
|---|---|---|---|
Riding created from Sunbury (1785–1973)
| 48th | 1974–1978 | Horace Smith | Progressive Conservative |
| 49th | 1978–1982 | Horace Smith | Progressive Conservative |
| 50th | 1982–1987 | Horace Smith | Progressive Conservative |
| 51st | 1987–1991 | Doug Harrison | Liberal |
| 52nd | 1991–1995 | Max White | Confederation of Regions |
Riding dissolved into New Maryland and Grand Lake

== Election results ==
1991 New Brunswick general election
| Party | Candidate | Votes | % | ±% |
|---|---|---|---|---|
| Confederation of Regions | Max White | 3,935 | 51.40 | – |
| Liberal | Shawn Perry | 2,616 | 34.17 | -30.50 |
| Progressive Conservative | Keith Ashfield | 799 | 10.44 | -16.80 |
| New Democratic | Barbara Ann Fairley | 306 | 4.00 | -4.09 |
| Total valid votes | | 7,656 | 100.0 | |
| Confederation of Regions gain from Liberal | | Swing | | +40.95 |

1987 New Brunswick general election
| Party | Candidate | Votes | % | ±% |
|---|---|---|---|---|
| Liberal | Doug Harrison | 4,551 | 64.67 | +21.95 |
| Progressive Conservative | Horace Smith | 1,917 | 27.24 | -23.64 |
| New Democratic | Christina Corey | 569 | 8.09 | +1.70 |
| Total valid votes | | 7,037 | 100.0 | |
| Liberal gain from Progressive Conservative | | Swing | | +22.80 |

1982 New Brunswick general election
| Party | Candidate | Votes | % | ±% |
|---|---|---|---|---|
| Progressive Conservative | Horace Smith | 3,192 | 50.88 | -3.00 |
| Liberal | Michael Edward McTiernan | 2,680 | 42.72 | +3.20 |
| New Democratic | Anna Trefry | 401 | 6.39 | -0.21 |
| Total valid votes | | 6,273 | 100.0 | |
| Progressive Conservative hold | | Swing | | -3.10 |

1978 New Brunswick general election
| Party | Candidate | Votes | % | ±% |
|---|---|---|---|---|
| Progressive Conservative | Horace Smith | 3,045 | 53.88 | -2.97 |
| Liberal | Ted Rogers | 2,233 | 39.52 | +0.57 |
| New Democratic | Randy E. Brodeur | 373 | 6.60 | +2.41 |
| Total valid votes | | 5,651 | 100.0 | |
| Progressive Conservative hold | | Swing | | -1.77 |

1974 New Brunswick general election
| Party | Candidate | Votes | % |
|---|---|---|---|
| Progressive Conservative | Horace Smith | 2,887 | 56.85 |
| Liberal | H.W. "Ted" Rogers | 1,978 | 38.95 |
| New Democratic | M. Elizabeth Snow | 213 | 4.19 |
| Total valid votes | | 5,078 | 100.0 |
The previous multi-member riding of Sunbury went totally Progressive Conservative in the previous election. Horace Smith was one of the two incumbents.

== See also ==
- List of New Brunswick provincial electoral districts
- Canadian provincial electoral districts
