= R. Lee MacFarlane =

Canadian politician (1893- 1968)

Member of the Legislative Assembly of New Brunswick
- In office 1960–1967
- Constituency: Sunbury

Personal details
- Born: June 7, 1893 Chipman, New Brunswick
- Died: January 25, 1968 (aged 74) Minto, New Brunswick
- Party: New Brunswick Liberal Association
- Spouse: Bessie O. Miller
- Children: 5
- Occupation: trainman

Robert Lee MacFarlane (June 7, 1893 – January 25, 1968) was a Canadian politician. He served in the Legislative Assembly of New Brunswick from 1960 to 1967 as member of the Liberal party.
