= Horace Smith (New Brunswick politician) =

Canadian politician

Horace Smith (March 17, 1914 – March 22, 2001) was a Canadian politician in the Province of New Brunswick.

In the 1970 New Brunswick general election Smith was elected as the Progressive Conservative Party candidate in the Sunbury riding. He would be reelected three more times, serving for seventeen years until 1987. He was secretary of the Progressive Conservative Party of New Brunswick and also served as President of the Union of New Brunswick Municipalities.

Premier Richard Hatfield appointed Horace Smith to the Cabinet as a Minister without portfolio and on July 18, 1972 to Minister of Municipal Affairs, a position he held for more than ten years until October 30, 1982. Smith was defeated in the 1987 election by Liberal Party candidate, Doug Harrison.

New Brunswick provincial government of Richard Hatfield
Cabinet post (1)
Predecessor	Office	Successor
'Jean-Paul LeBlanc'	'Minister of Municipal Affairs'; 1972-1982	'Yvon Poitras'
Legislative Assembly of New Brunswick
Preceded by Douglas A. Flower	MLA for Sunbury; 1972-1987	Succeeded by Doug Harrison
