= Gabriel F. Smith =

Canadian politician

Member of the Legislative Assembly of New Brunswick
- In office 1935–1939
- Constituency: Sunbury

Personal details
- Born: February 13, 1876 Hoyt Station, New Brunswick
- Died: March 23, 1939 (aged 63) Fredericton, New Brunswick
- Party: New Brunswick Liberal Association
- Spouse: Gertrude Shanks
- Occupation: lumberman

Gabriel Fowler Smith (February 13, 1876 – March 23, 1939) was a Canadian politician. He served in the Legislative Assembly of New Brunswick as member of the Liberal party from 1935 to 1939.

Gabriel Smith was born in Blissville, Sunbury County, New Brunswick, Canada. He married Gertrude Victoria Shanks and had 4 kids.
