= Max White (politician) =

Canadian politician

Member of the New Brunswick Legislative Assembly for Sunbury
- In office September 23, 1991 – September 11, 1995
- Preceded by: Doug Harrison
- Succeeded by: Joan Kingston

Personal details
- Born: November 20, 1938 Fort Fairfield, Maine
- Died: April 20, 2026 (aged 87)
- Party: Progressive Conservative
- Other political affiliations: Confederation of Regions
- Education: University of New Brunswick
- Occupation: Teacher, principal

Max White (born Stephen Maxwell White) was a politician in the province of New Brunswick, Canada. He was elected to the Legislative Assembly of New Brunswick in 1991 and defeated for re-election by Joan Kingston in 1995 for the re-distributed district of New Maryland.

== Career ==
He represented the electoral district of Sunbury as part of the Confederation of Regions party.

White became a member of the New Brunswick Progressive Conservative Party and supported Mike Allen in the 2016 Progressive Conservative Party leadership election

White died on April 20, 2026, in Fredericton, New Brunswick.
