= Rufus Smith =

Canadian politician (1766–1844)

Rufus Smith (MD) (November 19, 1766 – November 15, 1844) was a medical doctor and politician in the British colonial Province of New Brunswick, Canada.

Born in Stamford in the Colony of Connecticut, after the American Revolutionary War his Loyalist family emigrated to New Brunswick, Canada, settling in a rural area on the west bank of the Missaguash River near the present-day town of Sackville.

Trained in medicine, Dr. Rufus Smith had a large practice, serving the residents across the Isthmus of Chignecto. In 1789, he married Elizabeth Dixon (1770–1859) of Sackville. They had five daughters and two sons. In 1817, he was elected to the 6th New Brunswick Legislative Assembly as a representative for the County of Westmorland. He was the representative again in the 7th and 8th Assemblies, serving until 1827, then again in the 10th Assembly from 1831 to 1834.

Rufus Smith died in 1844 and is buried in the Methodist Church cemetery at Point de Bute. His daughter, Diana Gay Smith, married Lestock P. W. DesBrisay, a businessman from Richibucto, New Brunswick who would represent Kent County in the Legislative Assembly of New Brunswick from 1856 to 1866. They had a son, Rufus Smith Desbrisay, who was born in 1843, a year before Rufus's death.
