= Peter Clinch (politician) =

Canadian politician

Peter Clinch (1753 – July 31, 1816) was an Irish-born political figure in New Brunswick. He represented Charlotte in the Legislative Assembly of New Brunswick from 1785 to 1795.

== Early life ==
He was educated at Trinity College Dublin and emigrated to America before the American Revolution. Clinch served as a lieutenant in the Royal Fencible Americans during the revolution.

== Settlement of Saint George Town ==
In 1783, Clinch saw his regimental unit disbanded, and in 1784 they were granted 700 acres of land facing Cailiff Island to settle 108 men, 40 women and 53 children.

His son later remarked "My father had charge of a party of soldiers...sent to colonize a howling wilderness - the most unfit employment they could be put to...so glad was the skipper of the vessel to get rid of such a disorderly and almost mutinous crew, that he sailed away the moment he got them landed...that night my father slept in the open air and such a heavy fall of snow came that he had some difficulty removing the blankets next morning".

Clinch himself noted "Little indeed was to be expected from old soldiers. They preferred loitering around those places where rum was to be had, between which, and make a few shingles, catching fish and hunting occasionally, the time was consumed."

By 1786, he had given the name of Lake Utopia to the region.

Clinch became a magistrate and organized a militia company.

He died at St. George.

His son Patrick also represented Charlotte in the assembly.

Clinch is considered a founding father of St. George.
