= James Taylor (1761–1834) =

Canadian politician

James Taylor (February 1761 – January 27, 1834) was a farmer, merchant and political figure in New Brunswick. He represented Sunbury County in the Legislative Assembly of New Brunswick from 1809 to 1816 and in 1820.

He was born in Truro, Nova Scotia, the son of Matthew Taylor, a native of County Londonderry in Ireland, and Elizabeth Archibald. He settled in the Saint John River valley during the 1780s, where he became a lumber merchant, operated a farm and raised livestock. Taylor married Margaret Bartlett. After being elected in 1809, he was defeated by Elijah Miles in 1816. His election in 1819 was overturned in March 1820 after an appeal; he was defeated in the general election later in 1820. He died at Maugerville in 1834.
