= Ward Chipman Jr. =

Canadian politician

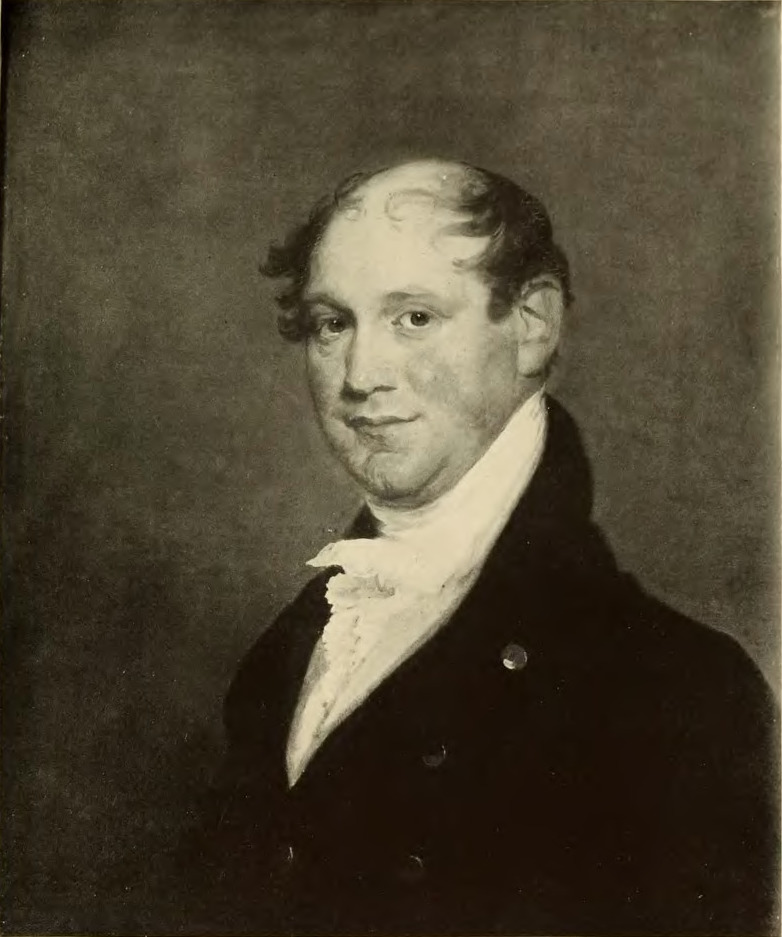
- portrait by Gilbert Stuart
- Born: July 10, 1787
- Died: November 26, 1851 (aged 64)

Ward Chipman (July 10, 1787 – November 26, 1851) was a lawyer, judge and political figure in the pre-Confederation Province of New Brunswick, Canada.

He was born in Saint John, New Brunswick in 1787, the son of Ward Chipman and Elizabeth Hazen Chipman. He studied in Salem, Massachusetts, and then at Harvard College. He studied law in his father's office and became an attorney in 1808. In 1810, he went to London and continued his studies in law with George Sowley Holroyd, being admitted to the bar in England in 1812. On his return, he resumed practice and, in 1815, was named recorder for the city of Saint John. He later became a director of the Bank of New Brunswick. He assisted his father during negotiations held in 1816 with the state of Maine to determine the ownership of certain islands in Passamaquoddy Bay. In 1820, he was elected to the Legislative Assembly of New Brunswick for Saint John County. In 1824, he was elected Speaker for the assembly. In 1825, after his father's death, he was named to the New Brunswick Supreme Court. In 1834, he was named chief justice for New Brunswick, which also made him president of the Legislative Council. He resigned from the council in 1842 and from his position as judge in 1850 due to illness.

He died in Saint John in 1851.
