= Charles Newland Godfrey Jadis =

Charles Newland Godfrey Jadis (6 November 1730 – March 1801) was a naval officer, army officer, and merchant in Canada.

Jadis served as a naval officer for several years and was once shipwrecked in the Saint Lawrence River. In 1769 he purchased land near Gagetown, New Brunswick, and moved there with his family. There, he was harassed by fellow trader James Simonds and was forced to retreat to England. He returned in 1772 and again encountered trouble, this time from supporters of the American Revolution. Jadis left the Saint John and returned to England, where he died.
