= The World's Largest Lobster =

Canadian roadside attraction

Coordinates: 46°13′7.31″N 64°33′17.95″W

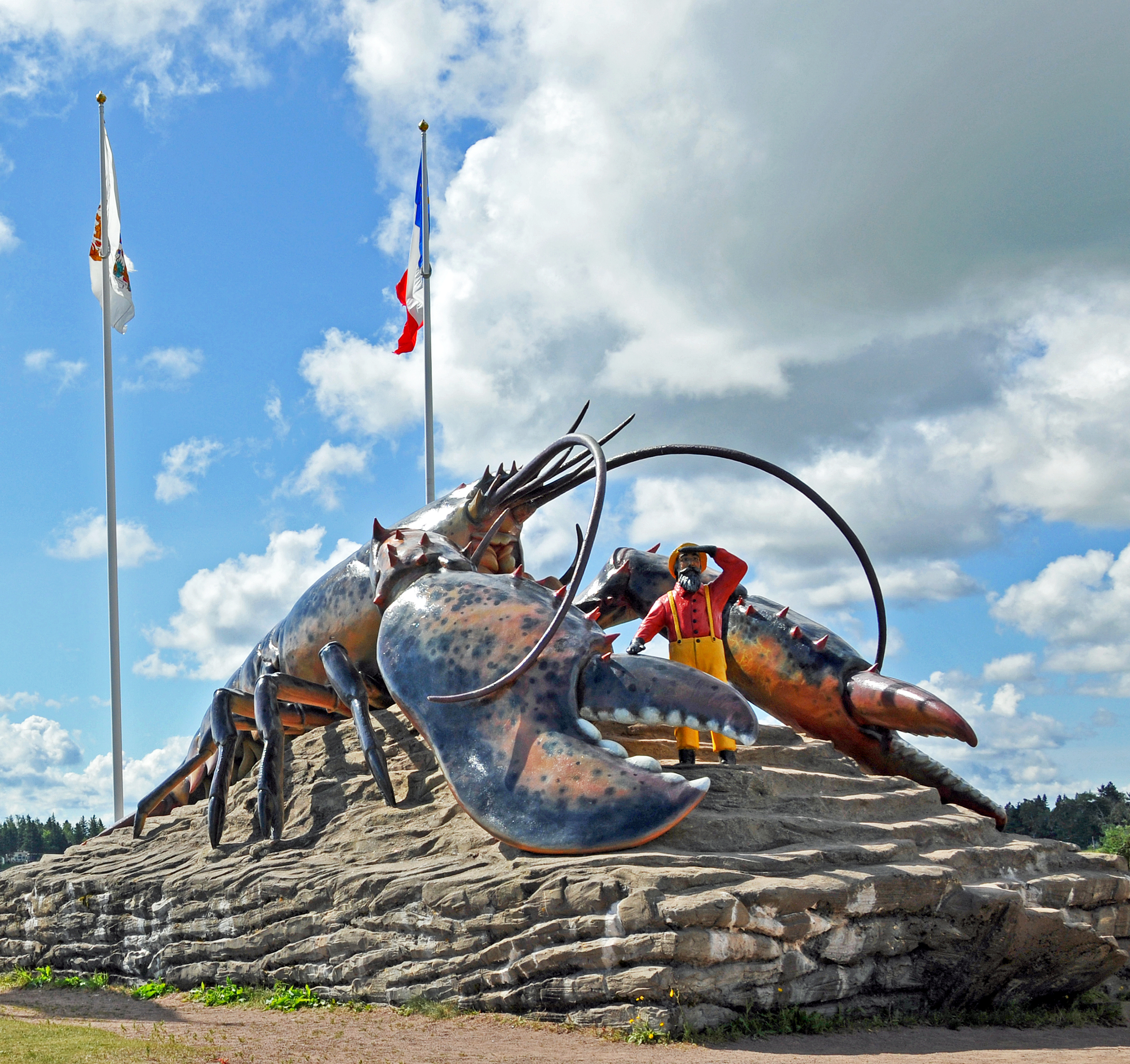
- Artist: Winston Bronnum
- Year: 1990
- Type: Roadside attraction
- Medium: Reinforced concrete sculpture
- Location: Shediac, New Brunswick
- Owner: Town of Shediac

The World's Largest Lobster (French: Le plus grand homard du monde) is a sculpture in Shediac, New Brunswick, Canada. Despite being known by its name The World's Largest Lobster, it is not actually the world's largest lobster sculpture, the largest sculpture is located in China measuring 18.92 x 12.81 x 15.64 metre(s).

== Description ==
The sculpture is 11 metres long and 5 metres tall, weighing 90 tonnes. Alone the lobster weighs 55 tones and the pedestal weighs 35 tones. The sculpture was commissioned by the Shediac Rotary Club as a tribute to the town's lobster fishing industry. The sculpture is a reflection of the crustacean's real life anatomy. The sculpture took three years to complete, at a cost of $170,000. It attracts 500,000 visitors per year. The sculpture is one of the most photographed tourist attractions in the Maritimes. There is a staircase on the pedestal to allow visitors to climb up on to the sculpture to take pictures. Contrary to popular belief, this is not actually the "World's Largest Lobster" as that title went to the Big Lobster sculpture in Kingston, South Australia, until 2015 when Qianjiang, Hubei, China built a 100-tonne lobster/crayfish.

== Construction ==
The sculpture was created and constructed by New Brunswick sculptor Winston Bronnum. The giant lobster sculpture was unveiled on June 30th 1990. The sculpture is made out of concrete, steel, rebar and it takes around eight gallons of paint to paint the entire lobster. Jared Betts was commissioned by the Town of Shediac to repair, paint and maintain the lobster.

== Cultural Significance ==
Shediac promotes itself as the lobster capital of the world due to the generations of Acadian fishermen who have caught lobsters on the Northumberland Strait and many residents have worked in local canning faciliaties. Lobsters are such a prominent part of their community that the town hosts an annual lobster festival.

== See also ==
- List of world's largest roadside attractions
- Betsy the Lobster, another large lobster sculpture
