= Amos Perley =

Canadian politician

Amos Perley (May 24, 1777 – 1822) was a political figure in New Brunswick. He represented Sunbury in the Legislative Assembly of New Brunswick from 1821 to 1822.

He was born in Maugerville, New Brunswick, Sunbury County, New Brunswick, the son of Asa Perley, a native of Massachusetts. Perley was married twice: first to Hannah Nevers and then, in 1815, to Maria Carman. He died in office.
