= George A. Sterling =

Canadian politician (1836–1883)

George Archibald Sterling (October 26, 1836 – 1883) was a farmer and political figure in New Brunswick, Canada. He represented Sunbury County in the Legislative Assembly of New Brunswick in 1883 as a Liberal member.

He was born in Saint Marys, New Brunswick, the son of George H. Sterling. In 1858, he married Caroline Tilley. He served as a member of the provincial Board of Agriculture. Sterling died in office at the age of 47.
