= Animaland Park =

Park in New Brunswick, Canada

Coordinates: 45.7493°N 65.4246°W

Animaland Park is a defunct sculpture garden and amusement park in New Brunswick on Route 114 in Penobsquis, New Brunswick. It was created by nature artist and sculptor Winston Atwood Bronnum. The park featured life-size concrete animal sculptures including fighting moose and a duck slide, as well as a giant lobster playground structure. Although it is now closed, "Blowhard the Horse" remains at the entrance.

In 2018, the land that the park sits was opened as a campground. The statues remain as a feature of the new campground.
