= Hugh Johnston Jr. =

Canadian politician

Hugh Johnston (April 3, 1790 – April 13, 1850) was a merchant and politician in New Brunswick. He represented the city of St. John from 1820 to 1830 and Queen's County from 1834 to 1842 and from 1847 to 1850 in the Legislative Assembly of New Brunswick.

He was born near Gagetown, New Brunswick, the son of Hugh Johnston and Ann Gilzean. In 1822, he married Elizabeth Murray, the daughter of John Murray Bliss. He began work in his father's company but then formed his own company in partnership with Robert William Crookshank. Following the death of his first wife in 1826, Johnston retired from the business. He invested his share of the business and later his share of his father's estate in various investments and lived off that income. Johnston married Harriet Maria, the daughter of Thomas Millidge in 1829. In 1830, he was named a magistrate for the city of Saint John. He was named to the province's Executive Council in 1837. He was defeated in the 1842 election but was named to the Legislative Council and named again to the Executive Council. Johnston resigned from the Executive Council in 1845 after William MacBean George Colebrooke named his son-in-law provincial secretary. Johnston was persuaded to return to office in 1846 by the colonial secretary and served until 1848. He also served as a director for the Bank of New Brunswick, the New Brunswick Marine Assurance Company and the New Brunswick Mining Company. Johnston died at his estate Roseneath in Queen's County at the age of 60.
