= Richard Ketchum =

Canadian politician

Richard Ketchum (1773 – November 10, 1845) was a political figure in New Brunswick. He represented York County in the Legislative Assembly of New Brunswick from 1827 to 1830.

He was born in Long Island, New York, the son of United Empire Loyalists, James Ketchum and Sarah Burr. Following the end of the American Revolutionary War, his family was evacuated to what became the Province of New Brunswick in 1783. They first settled at Kingston, New Brunswick but later moved to Woodstock.

Around 1795, Ketchum married Charlotte Upham.

He was defeated by Jedediah Slason in the 1827 election but declared the winner after an appeal. Slason defeated Ketchum in 1830. In 1832, he donated land for a court house and jail so that Upper Woodstock could become the county town for the newly formed Carleton County. Ketchum was a lieutenant colonel in the local militia. He also served as a judge in the Court of Common Pleas for Carleton County. He died in Woodstock at the age of 73.

His daughter Sarah married Charles Peters Wetmore, clerk for the assembly. Their son Edward Ludlow Wetmore later served in the province's legislative assembly and became the first Chief Justice for the province of Saskatchewan.
