= Thomas Millidge =

Canadian politician

- Born: c.1735 Hanover Township, New Jersey
- Died: 8 September 1816; Granville, Nova Scotia
- Military career
- Allegiance: Great Britain (Loyalist)
- Rank: Major
- Unit: New Jersey Volunteers

Thomas Millidge (c. 1735 – September 8, 1816) was a surveyor, judge, soldier and politician in Nova Scotia. He represented Digby Township from 1785 to 1793 and Annapolis County from 1793 to 1806 in the Nova Scotia House of Assembly.

== Life ==
He was born in Hanover Township, New Jersey, the son of John Millidge. In 1758, he married Mercy Berker.

He was named deputy surveyor for Morris, Sussex, Bergen, and Essex counties in 1765. In 1775, he was named justice of the peace for Morris County.

In the lead up to the outbreak of the American War of Independence, Millidge had been an advocate for non-violent and legal solutions to the grievances of the Thirteen Colonies. He joined the British Army at the end of 1776, being commissioned a major in the New Jersey Volunteers on 11 December 1776. In August 1778 his property in New Jersey was seized and sold at auction; he was later paid some compensation for his losses.

At the end of the war, he was granted land in the Annapolis Valley area of Nova Scotia. He settled first at Digby and then later at Granville where he amassed 900 acres of land in Wilmot and Digby townships.

In 1785 he was elected to the Nova Scotia House of Assembly as the first representative for Digby Township, a seat he held until 1793. He then served for Annapolis County from 1793 to 1806.

In 1806, Millidge was defeated in a bid for re-election to represent Granville Township in the provincial assembly by Isaiah Shaw. He also served as a justice of the peace, judge in the Inferior Court of Common Pleas and colonel in the local militia.

Millidge died in Granville on 8 September 1816.

His son Thomas served in the Legislative Assembly of New Brunswick.
