= Milledge =

Milledge is a given name and a surname, and may refer to:

== Surname ==
- John Milledge (1757–1818), American politician
- Lastings Milledge (born 1985), baseball player

== Given name ==
- Milledge Luke Bonham (1813–1890), American politician and Congressman
- Sarah Milledge Nelson (1931–2020), American archaeologist
