= Thomas Millidge Jr. =

Canadian politician

Thomas Millidge (August 12, 1776 – August 21, 1838) was a businessman and political figure in New Brunswick. He represented St. John County in the Legislative Assembly of New Brunswick from 1816 to 1820.

He was born in New Jersey, the son of Thomas Millidge, a United Empire Loyalist who served with the New Jersey Volunteers, and Mercy Berker. Millidge came to Nova Scotia with his parents in 1783. He moved to a location on the Kennebecasis River in New Brunswick where he established himself as a shipbuilder. A community known as Millidgeville, which later became part of Saint John, developed there. In 1801, he married Sarah, the daughter of James Simonds. Millidge was one of the founding members of the Saint John Chamber of Commerce, later serving as its president, and was a director for the Bank of New Brunswick, the New Brunswick Fire Insurance Company and the Saint John Water Company. He also served as a magistrate for St. John County. Millidge died in Saint John at the age of 62.

His daughter Harriet Maria married Hugh Johnston.
