= Douglas A. Flower =

Canadian politician (1916–2009)

Member of the Legislative Assembly of New Brunswick
- In office 1967–1970
- Constituency: Sunbury

Personal details
- Born: November 24, 1916 New Zion, New Brunswick
- Died: July 30, 2009 (aged 92) Fredericton, New Brunswick
- Party: New Brunswick Liberal Association
- Spouse: Alice Wanamaker
- Children: 3

Douglas Arnold Flower (November 24, 1916 – July 30, 2009) was a Canadian politician. He served in the Legislative Assembly of New Brunswick from 1967 to 1970 as a member of the Liberal party.
