= David Tapley =

Canadian politician

David Tapley (April 12, 1820 – 1894) was a farmer, lumber surveyor, lawyer, judge and political figure in New Brunswick. He represented Sunbury in the Legislative Assembly of New Brunswick from 1856 to 1861.

He was born in Sheffield, Sunbury County, New Brunswick, the son of David Tapley and Hannah Fletcher. He worked on the family farm and then moved to Saint John where he entered the lumber business. He married Margaret Ann Dalton in 1841. After leaving politics, Tapley moved to Portland (now part of Saint John), where he served as police magistrate and judge in the civil court until 1889. After beginning the study of law in 1876, he was called to the New Brunswick bar in October 1880. He died at his home in Portland.

His former home was designated a local historic site by the city of Saint John.
