= John Richard Partelow =

Canadian politician

14th Mayor of Saint John, New Brunswick
- In office 1847–1849
- Preceded by: Lauchlan Donaldson
- Succeeded by: William H. Street

Personal details
- Born: April 20, 1795 Saint John, Colony of New Brunswick
- Died: January 13, 1865 (aged 69) Saint John, Colony of New Brunswick
- Spouse: Jane Hamlin Matthew (m. 1819)
- Children: 8
- Parent: Jehiel Partelow

John Richard Partelow (April 20, 1795 – January 13, 1865) was a merchant and political figure in New Brunswick. He represented Saint John County in the Legislative Assembly of New Brunswick from 1827 to 1850 and from 1854 to 1855 and Victoria County from 1851 to 1854.

He was born in Saint John, New Brunswick, the son of Jehiel Partelow, a shoemaker, and was educated there. He worked as a clerk in a store before entering business on his own by 1827. In 1819, he married Jane Hamlin Matthew, with whom he had eight daughters.

Circa 1821 he and Hugh Johnston, Sr., purchased the ship Prince Regent, and transferred her registry to St John. Prince Regent had been built in New Brunswick and traded between Liverpool and New Brunswick until she was wrecked in November 1823.

Partelow became chairman of the appropriations and audit committees which were involved in the distribution of public funds to the counties, a position of great power in the assembly. From 1848 to 1854, he was provincial secretary. Partelow also served as chamberlain for Saint John from 1827 to 1843 and mayor from 1847 to 1848. In 1855, he was named auditor general and served in that post until his death in Fredericton in 1865.
