= Hugh Johnston =

Canadian politician

Hugh Johnston (January 4, 1756 – November 29, 1829) was a Scottish-born merchant and politician in New Brunswick. He represented St. John County in the Legislative Assembly of New Brunswick from 1802 to 1820.

He was born in Morayshire, the son of William Johnston and Isabel Hepburn. He married Ann Gilzean. He set up business at Saint John, New Brunswick in the 1780s. Johnston traded fish and lumber for sugar and molasses from the West Indies which was used to manufacture rum in Scotland. In 1806, he married Margaret Thurburn after the death of his first wife.

Circa 1821 he and John Richard Partelow purchased the ship Prince Regent, and transferred her registry to St John. Prince Regent had been built in New Brunswick and traded between Liverpool and New Brunswick until she was wrecked in November 1823.

Johnston was a director of the Bank of New Brunswick and a port warden for the harbour at Saint John. With others, he helped establish the first Presbyterian church in New Brunswick. Johnston was named a magistrate for St. John County in 1818. He died in Saint John at the age of 73.

His son Hugh Johnston, Jr. also served in the New Brunswick assembly.
