= Thomas O. Miles =

Canadian politician (1789–1858)

Thomas Odber Miles (April 20, 1789 – June 5, 1858) was a farmer and political figure in New Brunswick. He represented Sunbury County in the Legislative Assembly of New Brunswick from 1827 to 1837 and from 1846 to 1850.

He was born in Maugerville, New Brunswick, the son of Elijah Miles and Frances Cornwell, a descendant of Thomas Cornell. He was educated in Maugerville and took up farming there. In 1815, he married Sarah Ann Carman. Miles was a justice of the peace, justice in the Inferior Court of Common Pleas and commissioner for roads. He also served as colonel in the local militia. Besides farming, he also was involved in shipbuilding and served as the local dentist. He was defeated in the 1837 election and retired from politics in 1850.
