= Patrick Clinch =

Canadian politician

Patrick Clinch (c. 1790 – March 10, 1868) was a farmer, newspaper owner, and political figure in New Brunswick. He represented Charlotte in the Legislative Assembly of New Brunswick from 1828 to 1829 and from 1830 to 1837.

He was born in St. George, New Brunswick, the son of Peter Clinch and his wife Lucretia, and was educated there. Clinch founded the Provincialist of St. Andrews. He was a justice of the peace, a justice in the Inferior Court of Common Pleas for Charlotte County, and also served as a school inspector for the county. Clinch married Eleanor Davidson. He ran unsuccessfully for a seat in the assembly in 1827, losing to Joseph N. Clarke; he successfully appealed Clarke's election in 1828, but this decision was reversed in January 1829. He was elected again in 1830 and 1834, but was defeated when he ran for reelection in 1837. Clinch died at home in St. George at the age of 79.
