= Charles Harrison (Canadian politician) =

Canadian politician

Charles Harrison (1792 – May 8, 1879) was a political figure in New Brunswick. He represented Queen's County in the Legislative Assembly of New Brunswick from 1829 to 1834.

He was born in Sheffield, New Brunswick, the son of Lieutenant James Harrison, a United Empire Loyalist, and Charity Cowperthwaite. Harrison was educated in Sheffield. He married Mary Burpee. He did not run for reelection in 1836. In 1849, Harrison was named to the Legislative Council of New Brunswick.
