= Harry Peters (politician) =

Canadian merchant and politician (1816 to 1828)

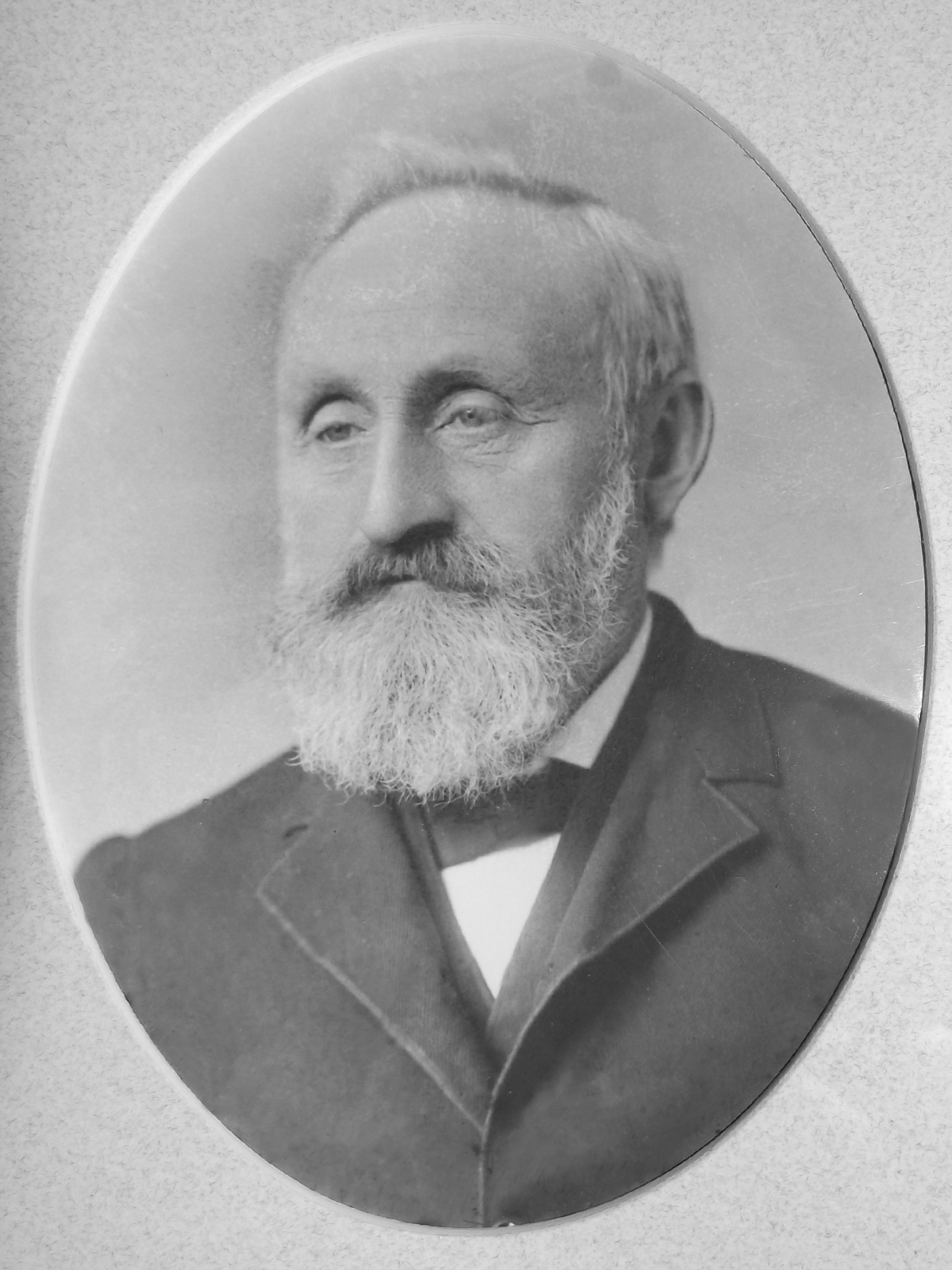

Speaker of the Legislative Assembly of New Brunswick
- In office January 19, 1826 – 1828
- Preceded by: Ward Chipman Jr.
- Succeeded by: Richard Simonds

Member of the Legislative Assembly of New Brunswick for Saint John City
- In office September 1816 – 1827

Member of the Legislative Assembly of New Brunswick for Queens
- In office June 1827 – 1828

Member of the Legislative Council of New Brunswick
- In office 1828 – April 5, 1843

Personal details
- Born: 1789 Gagetown, New Brunswick
- Died: March 1, 1871 Gagetown, New Brunswick
- Occupation: Merchant, farmer

Harry Peters (ca. 1789 – March 3, 1871) was a merchant and political figure in the province of New Brunswick, Canada. He represented the city of Saint John in the Legislative Assembly of New Brunswick from 1816 to 1828.

He was the son of James Peters and Margaret Lester. Peters was a merchant in Saint John. He replaced Ward Chipman, Jr. as speaker for the legislature in 1826. Peters served as a member of the Legislative Council of New Brunswick from 1828 to 1843 and was a member of the Executive Council from 1828 to 1832. He later moved to Gagetown where he died at the age of 82.

His brother Charles Jeffery served as Attorney General and his brother Benjamin Lester became mayor of Saint John.

The community of Petersville, later expropriated during the expansion of CFB Gagetown, was named in his honour.
