= Joseph Crandall =

Canadian Baptist Evangelist and Minister

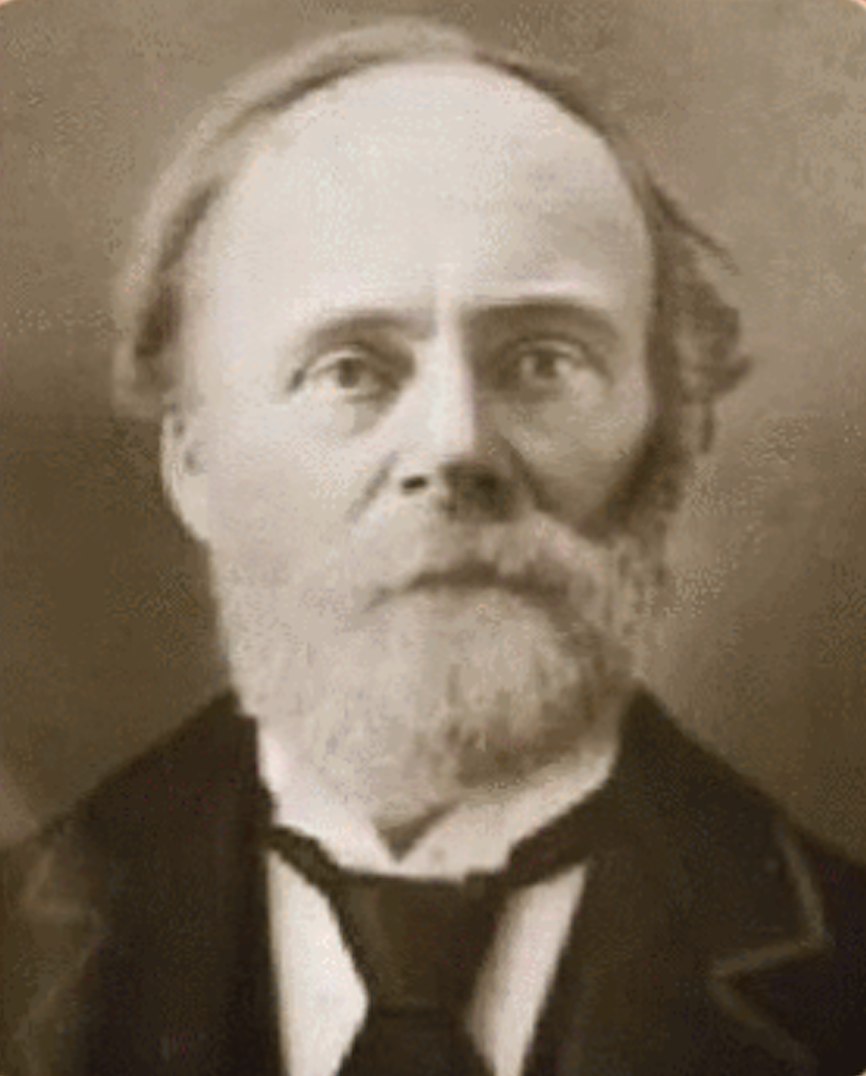
- Portrait of Joseph Crandall
- Born: 1771; Tiverton, Rhode Island
- Died: February 20, 1858 (aged 86–87); Salisbury, New Brunswick

Joseph Crandall (1771 – February 20, 1858) was a Baptist minister, travelling evangelist, and for a short time a political figure in New Brunswick. Joseph Crandall is considered to be "New Brunswick's only Baptist 'Patriarch.'" He represented Westmorland County in the Legislative Assembly from 1820 to 1822.

== Early life ==
He was born in Tiverton, Rhode Island, the son of Webber Crandall and Mercy Vaughan, and came to Chester, Nova Scotia with his parents. After his father died, he went to Liverpool to work in the cod fishery and then worked for a time transporting lumber.

== Later life ==
He became a Baptist at the age of 35 after hearing Joseph Dimock and Harris Harding. After preaching in Nova Scotia and New Brunswick for a time, he became pastor for a church in Sackville and also established a church at Salisbury. He was elected to the province's legislative assembly in 1820 and 1821 but was forced to resign because he was a preacher. Crandall was named the first moderator for the New Brunswick Baptist Association in 1822. He died in Salisbury, NB in 1858.

His son David also became a Baptist minister, finishing his long career at the Baptist Church in Hatfield Point, New Brunswick.

== Crandall University ==
On August 21, 2009, Atlantic Baptist University announced it would be changing its name to Crandall University, in honour of the late Joseph Crandall. When discussing this change, University President Brian MacArthur said, "Rev. Joseph Crandall, as a pioneering Baptist, was a man of passionate faith, who helped to found a university that was open to students of every denomination. He recognized the importance of combining faith and education."
