= James Simonds =

Canadian politician

James Simonds Esquire
- A copy of a contemporary portrait, c. 1900 – 1925.

Member of the 3rd New Brunswick Legislative Assembly for Saint John County
- In office 1796–1802
- Preceded by: See List
- Succeeded by: See List

Personal details
- Born: 10 December 1735 Haverhill, Massachusetts
- Died: 20 February 1831 (aged 95) Portland, New Brunswick
- Resting place: Fernhill Cemetery, Saint John (reinterred)
- Spouse: Hannah Simonds (née Peabody)
- Occupation: Settler, Businessman

James Simonds (December 10, 1735 – February 20, 1831) was a merchant, judge and political figure in New Brunswick. He represented Sunbury County in the Nova Scotia House of Assembly from 1773 to 1782 and Saint John City and County in the Legislative Assembly of New Brunswick from 1796 to 1802.

He was born in Haverhill, Massachusetts, the son of Nathan Simonds and Sarah Hazen, and moved to the mouth of the Saint John River, then part of Nova Scotia, in 1762. With partners including William Hazen, Simonds began trading in fish, furs, lime and lumber products with Massachusetts. Simonds served as magistrate, probate judge, registrar of deeds and deputy customs collector for Sunbury County. The business encountered problems during the American Revolution and Simonds tried to sell his share of the business but his partners were not prepared to buy him out. In 1816, fourteen years after he retired from politics, he was named magistrate.

== Personal life ==
In 1767, he married Hannah Peabody. His sons Charles and Richard both served in the legislative assembly.
