= Charles Simonds (politician) =

Canadian politician

Member of the Legislative Assembly of New Brunswick for Saint John County
- In office: 1821–1846; 1850–1851; 1856–1857

Personal details
- Born: August 22, 1783 Portland, New Brunswick
- Died: April 12, 1859 (aged 75) Saint John, New Brunswick
- Relations: James Simonds (father); Richard Simonds (brother)

Charles Simonds (August 22, 1783 – April 12, 1859) was a merchant and political figure in the pre-Confederation Province of New Brunswick, Canada. He represented Saint John County in the Legislative Assembly of New Brunswick from 1821 to 1846, from 1850 to 1851 and from 1856 to 1857.

He was born in Portland (later Saint John, New Brunswick), the son of James Simonds and Hannah Peabody, and educated there. Simonds joined his father's business, later taking over the management of its activities at Portland. In 1817, he married Catharine Mary Longmuir. In 1820, he became one of the first directors of the Bank of New Brunswick and, in 1824, he became its president. He married Lucy Anne Clopper, the sister of Henry George Clopper, in 1824 after the death of his first wife. Simonds also became involved with the Commercial Bank of New Brunswick and the Saint John Fire Insurance Company. He served as a member of the first council for King's College (later the University of New Brunswick). However, later Simonds became critical of the college. He was speaker for the legislative assembly from 1829 to 1831, succeeding his brother Richard. Simonds later served again as speaker from 1835 to 1841, in 1851 and from 1856 to 1857. He also was a member of the Executive Council and of the Legislative Council of New Brunswick. Simonds also served as a justice of the peace. He died in Saint John at the age of 75.
