= George Stracey Smyth =

British Army general

Major-General George Stracey Smyth
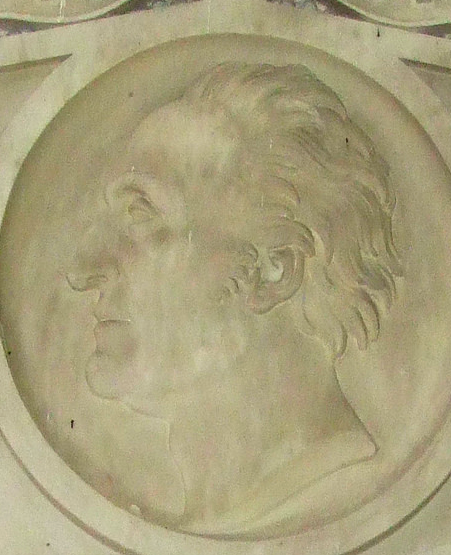
- George Stracey Smyth, All Saints, Chelsworth, Suffolk

2nd Lieutenant-Governor of New Brunswick
- In office 1817–1823
- Monarchs: George III; George IV
- Preceded by: Thomas Carleton
- Succeeded by: General Sir Howard Douglas, 3rd Baronet

Personal details
- Born: 4 April 1767 England
- Died: 27 March 1823 (aged 55) Fredericton, New Brunswick
- Spouse: Amelia Anne Cantelo

George Stracey Smyth (4 April 1767 – 27 March 1823) was Commander-in-Chief, North America, Lieutenant Governor of Nova Scotia and Lieutenant Governor of New Brunswick.

== Biography ==
Born in England, he was appointed an ensign in the East Norfolk Regiment of Militia in 1779. He joined the army as an ensign in the 25th Foot in 1780. In 1791, as a lieutenant, he served with Prince Edward Augustus, Duke of Kent and Strathearn, the fourth son of George III, in Gibraltar. He would serve on the prince's staff in Gibraltar, Quebec, the West Indies, and Nova Scotia for twelve years. In 1798, he was promoted to major, and the following year, was the senior aide-de-camp and acting quartermaster general for the Duke of Kent when he became Commander-in-Chief, North America. In 1812, he was promoted to major general. From 1817 to 1823, he was the Lieutenant-Governor of New Brunswick.

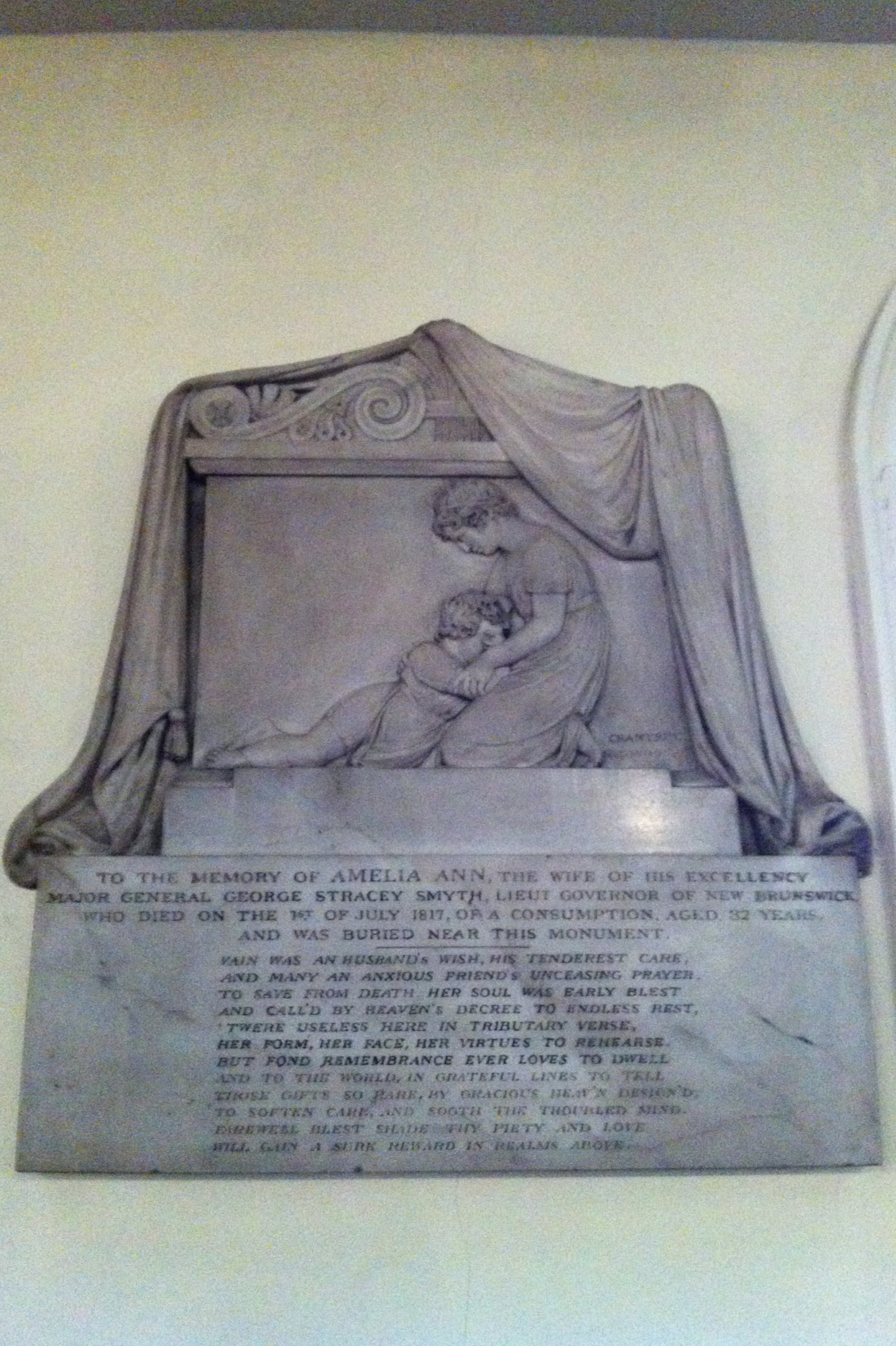
Amelia Ann Smyth (née Cantelo), d. 1817 (wife of acting Lt. Gov. of Nova Scotia George Stracey Smyth), St. Paul's Church (Halifax, Nova Scotia)

While he was Commander-in-Chief, his wife Amelia Ann Smyth (née Cantelo) died and has a memorial to her in St. Paul's Church (Halifax, Nova Scotia). There is a memorial to him in the church of All Saints, Chelsworth, Suffolk, England that was erected by his brother John Gee Smyth, Rector of Chelsworth, Suffolk and Chaplain to the Prince Edward, Duke of Kent and Strathearn. (His brother John became the guardian of George's children upon his death in 1823.)

Political offices
| Preceded by John Coape Sherbrooke | Lieutenant Governor of Nova Scotia (acting); 1816 | Succeeded by George Ramsay, 9th Earl of Dalhousie |
| Preceded by Thomas Carleton | Lieutenant Governor of New Brunswick; 1817–1823 | Succeeded by Sir Howard Douglas |
