= David Wetmore =

Canadian politician

David Brown Wetmore (November 4, 1764 – December 17, 1845) was a judge and political figure in New Brunswick. He represented King's in the Legislative Assembly of New Brunswick from 1820 to 1827.

He was a United Empire Loyalist born in Rye, New York, the son of James Wetmore and Elizabeth Abrahams. Wetmore moved to New Brunswick in 1783. In 1787, he married Ruth, the daughter of Justus Sherwood.
