= John Ward (loyalist) =

Canadian politician

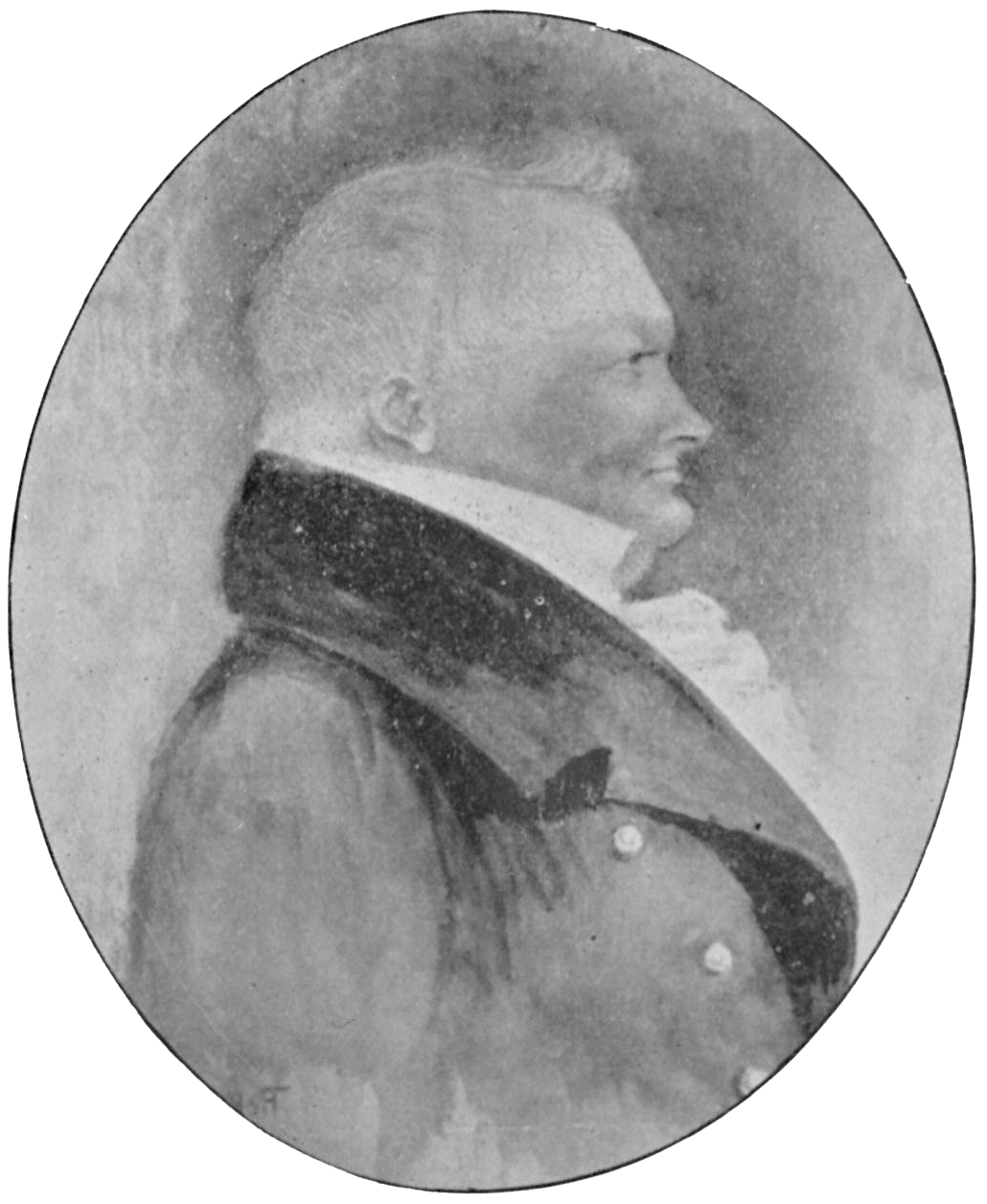
Major John Ward

John Ward (November 8, 1753 – August 5, 1846) was a businessman, militia officer and political figure in New Brunswick. He represented St. John County in the Legislative Assembly of New Brunswick in the years 1809, 1816, and 1819.

He was born in Peekskill, New York. Ward was probably the son of Edmund Ward and Elizabeth Ward and a descendant of Andrew Ward. He and his three brothers, Benjamin, Moses, and William, served with the Loyal American Regiment during the American Revolution, reaching the rank of lieutenant. In 1777 John Ward married Elizabeth Strang 1752–1831, fourth in descent from Daniel Strang and Charlotte Hubert who came from Havre, France in 1680. Their children were Caleb, John, William, Charles, Eliza, and Esther.

He led a unit of provincial troops to Parrtown (later Saint John, New Brunswick) in 1783. Lt. Ward was in command of the escort that accompanied Maj. Andre when he went up the Hudson. The following year, Ward settled in an area that would come to be known as Wards Creek but later returned to Parrtown. He returned to St. John in 1785 where he and his brother, Moses, formed a business partnership in the West India trade. Moses returned to the States and John and his sons, Caleb, John, and Charles established a wholesale liquor business, John Ward & Sons. The business expanded to incorporate the sale of general merchandise, lumber mills and an iron foundry. Ward and the Hon. Hugh Johnston operated the first steamboat, General Smyth, traveling between Saint John and Fredericton beginning May 10, 1816.

From 1799 to 1809, he served on the town council for Saint John. Ward also served as a justice of the peace, as a magistrate for the city and county of St. John and as a commissioner for lighthouses on the Bay of Fundy. In 1793, he helped found the Saint John's Loyal Company of Artillery. He later served as commander for all the county militia until 1816. He represented the county of St. John in the House of Assembly in the years 1809, 1816, and 1819. Ward died in Saint John in 1846.

His son, John Ward, Jr., born in a tent on 18 December 1783 at the Barrack Point, Lower Cove where no accommodation had been made for them. He also served in the New Brunswick assembly.
