= James Easterbrooks =

Canadian politician

James Easterbrooks (ca 1757 – 1842) was a political figure in New Brunswick. He represented Westmorland in the Legislative Assembly of New Brunswick from 1802 to 1820.

The son of Valentine Easterbrooks who came to New Brunswick from Rhode Island, he served as a magistrate for Westmorland County. Easterbrooks died in Sackville at the age of 85.
