= William Taylor (New Brunswick politician) =

Canadian politician (died 1834)

William Taylor (c. 1789 – March 27, 1834) was a Canadian businessman and political figure in New Brunswick. He represented York in the Legislative Assembly of New Brunswick from 1822 to 1834.

== Biography ==
Taylor was born in Fredericton, the son of James Taylor who was a native of Scotland, and was educated at the Fredericton Academy. He began work in his father's business in the timber trade while still young and formally joined James Taylor Senior and Company in 1821. Taylor was married twice: first to Ann Cameron in 1816 and then to Sally Hatfield in 1819. He served as secretary and treasurer for the central board of the New-Brunswick Agricultural and Emigrant Society. Taylor was also an auctioneer in York County. He was first elected to the New Brunswick assembly in an 1822 by-election held following the death of Stair Agnew. He died in office in Fredericton.

His brother James also served in the assembly.
