= Elijah Miles =

Canadian politician

Elijah Miles (January 16, 1753 – May 26, 1831) was a merchant, farmer, land owner and political figure in New Brunswick. He represented Sunbury County in the Legislative Assembly of New Brunswick from 1803 to 1809 and from 1816 to 1827.

He was born in Milford, Connecticut, the son of Justus Miles and Hannah Olmstead, and was educated there. Miles served in a loyalist unit during the American Revolution and came to New Brunswick after the war, settling in Maugerville. In 1779, he married Frances Cornwell, a descendant of Thomas Cornell. Miles was a captain in the King's New Brunswick Regiment from 1793 to 1802. He married Elizabeth Harding in 1800 after the death of his first wife. He was elected to the provincial assembly in 1802 after a number of voters who had voted for Samuel Denny Street were found to be ineligible by the sheriff. Miles was an unsuccessful candidate in 1809 but was elected in the three elections that followed. During his time in the assembly, Miles never opposed measures introduced by the government. He was a magistrate for Sunbury County and served as a justice for the Inferior Court of Common Pleas. Miles died in Maugerville at the age of 78.

His son Thomas also represented the county in the provincial assembly. Although Miles himself was a member of the Church of England, his son Frederick William Miles became a Baptist minister and was president of the first Baptist seminary in the province.

Elija was the great-great-great-grandfather of Richard Miles who served as MLA for Fredericton Silverwood in the province of NB elected in 2006.
