= Bank of New Brunswick =

Canadian bank (1820–1913)

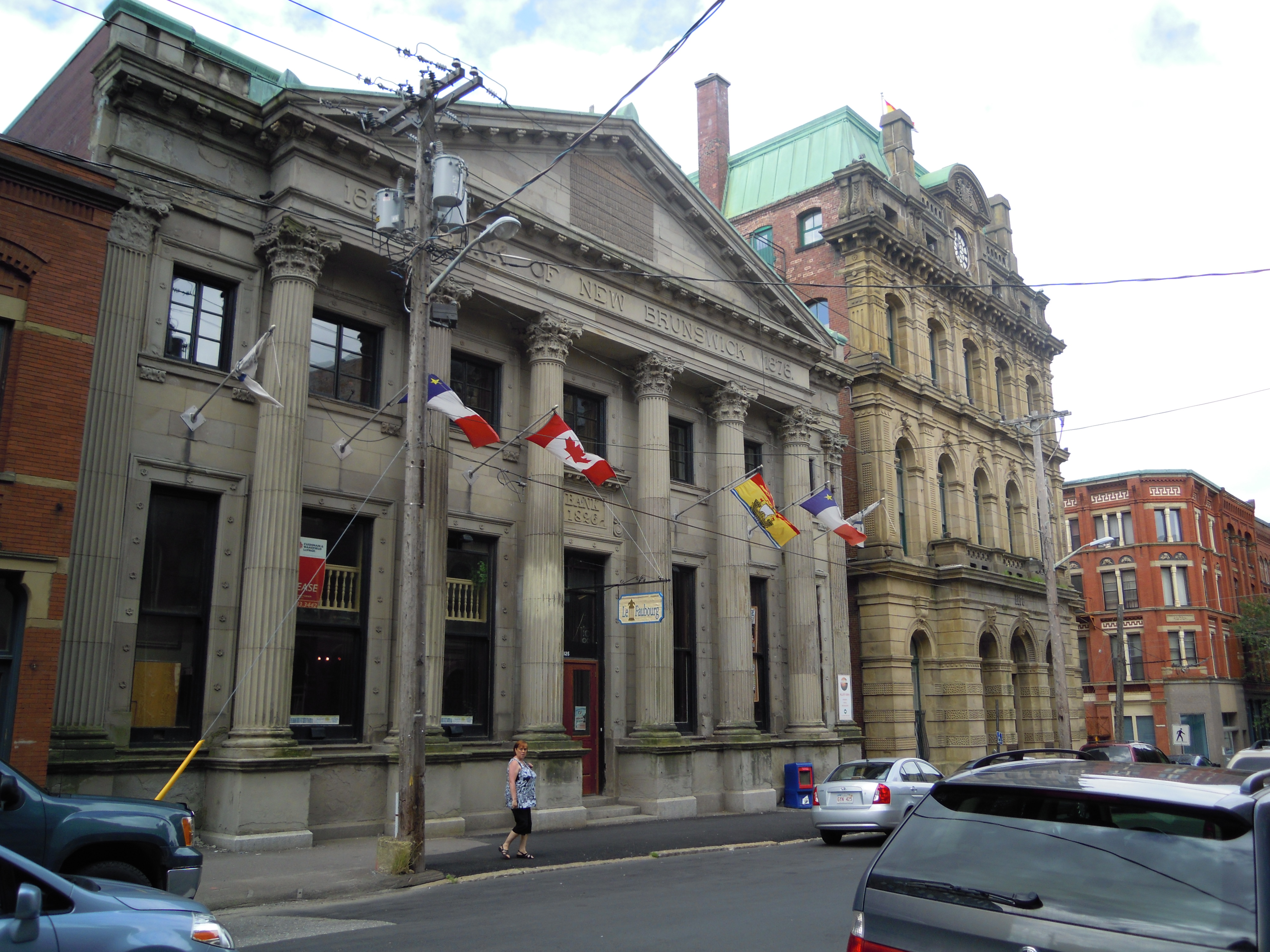
- Founded: March 25, 1820; 206 years ago in pre-Confederation Province of New Brunswick
- Defunct: February 15, 1913
- Successor: Merged into modern-day Bank of Nova Scotia (Scotiabank)
- Headquarters: New Brunswick, Canada
- Key people: First President: John Robinson

The Bank of New Brunswick, established in 1820, was the first Canadian bank to operate under a charter. The bank operated independently in New Brunswick and later in Prince Edward Island until it merged with the Bank of Nova Scotia (now Scotiabank) in 1913.

== History ==
=== Founding ===
The Bank of New Brunswick was established on March 25, 1820 in the pre-Confederation Province of New Brunswick, Canada, under a charter from the British government. It was founded in Saint John, New Brunswick by a group of the colony's prominent businessmen. At the time, Saint John was the largest city in the Maritime Provinces, exceeding in population both Halifax, Nova Scotia, and for a time during the 19th century, even Toronto, Ontario.

John Robinson was elected the first President of the Bank of New Brunswick and served until 1824 when he was succeeded by Charles Simonds. The Bank expanded through the acquisition of the City Bank of Saint John in 1839. By 1842, the bank held £100,000 in capital.

=== New Headquarters ===
Following the Great Fire in Saint John, the bank's headquarters were established in a new building built on Prince William Street in 1879, with a neoclassical bank façade reminiscent of a Corinthian temple of finance. The Bank of New Brunswick Building is on the Registry of Historical Places of Canada.

=== Expansion to Prince Edward Island ===
The acquisition of the Summerside Bank of P.E.I. in 1901, expanded the Bank's network. Following the City Bank acquisition, City Bank president Thomas Leavitt became president of the Bank of New Brunswick. Leavitt came from a family of merchants, shipowners and shipmasters of Saint John, New Brunswick. The Bank of New Brunswick on 268 Water Street, Summerside, Prince Edward Island, built 1909 to 1910 is on the Registry of Historical Places of Canada.

=== Merger ===
After Confederation in 1867, the four banks which had been established in New Brunswick began to struggle, as more and more investment money began moving to central Canada, and manufacturing in the new province began to decline. Over the objections of The Saint John Board of Trade, Sir John A. Macdonald's Conservative government voted down the Commercial Union Bill of March 5, 1888 which would have given Saint John direct access to a larger market in New England. By the early part of the 20th century it became apparent that none of the four banks were attracting enough capital to remain competitive. Saint John, the largest city, failed to attract investment from overseas despite 4% higher returns compared to Upper Canada.

The Bank of New Brunswick and its shareholders accepted an offer to merge with the Bank of Nova Scotia on February 15, 1913. As many of its investors were financing the opening up of the west, the bank's headquarters was moved to in Montreal. The Bank of Nova Scotia (Scotiabank) eventually moved its headquarters to Toronto - Canada's banking and financial centre.

== Bank notes ==
Like the other Canadian chartered banks established before the 1934 Bank of Canada Act, the Bank of New Brunswick and the Summerside Bank issued their own paper money. Around $30,000 in notes are in circulation. These notes can be reimbursed by the Bank of Canada, but their rarity often leads collectors to purchase them at a premium.
