= Peter Fraser (merchant) =

Canadian merchant and politician (1765–1840)

Peter Fraser (September 23, 1765 – August 13, 1840) was a Scottish-born merchant and political figure in New Brunswick. He represented York in the Legislative Assembly of New Brunswick from 1809 to 1827.

He was born in Forres, the son of James Fraser and Jean Rose. Fraser came to Fredericton in 1784 and established himself there as a fur trader. In 1789, he purchased a waterfront property and built a wharf and a store there. Fraser ran unsuccessfully for a seat in the assembly in 1802 before his election in 1809. In 1808, he was named a justice of the peace. Fraser became a major in the militia in 1824. He was defeated when he ran for reelection to the assembly in 1827 and subsequently retired from politics. He married Maria Berton. Fraser was a sponsor for the Bank of New Brunswick in 1820 and later served as its vice-president. He also served as vice-president for the Fredericton Savings Bank. Fraser was the first president of the St. Andrew's Society in Fredericton. He was also named a justice in the Inferior Court of Common Pleas. Fraser died in Fredericton at the age of 74.

His former home in Fredericton now served as a senior's residence.
