= Maugerville =

Unincorporated community in New Brunswick, Canada

Coordinates: 45°52′14″N 66°26′48″W

Maugerville (/ˈmeɪdʒərvɪl/ MAY-jər-vil) is a New Brunswick unincorporated community located on the east bank of the Saint John River in Maugerville Parish, Sunbury County, in the Canadian province of New Brunswick. The settlement is located on provincial Route 105, 16 kilometres southeast of the capital city of Fredericton and 3.18 kilometres northeast of the town of Oromocto.

== History ==
Early Settlement History

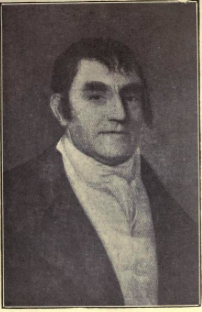
Joshua Mauger, namesake of Maugerville

Maugerville was the first English settlement established on the Saint John River subsequent to the British taking control of the area from the French, following the fall of Quebec in 1759. The story of its establishment demonstrates how colonial officials in Halifax, Nova Scotia, clandestinely dispossessed the Wəlastəkwiyik (Maliseet) indigenous peoples from their territorial lands without their knowledge, in violation of earlier Indian-British Treaties and the Royal Proclamations of 1761 and 1763.

In pre-contact northeastern North America the Wəlastəkwiyik indigenous peoples, as their name implies, were the people of the Wəlastəkw (Saint John River) from its mouth to its sources. The area now occupied by the current community of Maugerville was originally a hunting territory of the Wəlastəkwiyik, with the closest native settlement being at Sitansisk just above present day Fredericton, the pre-1759 site of the French settlement of St. Anne’s. However, early British maps of the area failed to illustrate the presence of the Wəlastəkwiyik settlements on the river, including the settlement at Sitansisk and their down-river hunting territories. In a series of Peace and Friendship Treaties between representatives of the Wəlastəkwiyik and British colonial officials in Nova Scotia, between 1725 and 1760, the Wəlastəkwiyik had agreed that they would "respect English settlements lawfully to be made." However, the Treaties contained no provision to cede Indian territory to the British. The ownership of Wəlastəkwiyik lands was further protected under the terms of the Royal Proclamations of 1761 and 1763, issued by King George III. These Proclamations specifically forbade provincial administrators, including the governor of Nova Scotia, from granting Indigenous lands to British settlers without due process, a procedure that involved the explicit permission of both Indigenous peoples and the British Crown. The vision behind the Proclamations was concern by the British Crown that "settlers could not be trusted to treat Indigenous peoples justly."

Prior to these Proclamations, with the expulsion of the Acadians in 1755 from Nova Scotia and the subsequent fall of Louisburg in 1758, Nova Scotia Governor Lawrence, advertised in the Boston Gazette of October 1758, for settlers to people and cultivate the land vacated by the Acadians and any other parts of "this valuable province." Shortly after Lawrence’s invitation, Colonel Alexander McNutt, deputy for Thomas Hancock, Lawrence’s Boston agent, encouraged a group of retired officers of the Massachusetts regiment from Essex County to take advantage of the Governor’s offer and settle on the St John River. The group commissioned Israel Perley, a young surveyor, along with twelve other men to travel to the Saint John River to explore settlement opportunities. The exploring party travelled to Machias by water and then overland to the headwaters of the Oromocto River. Using the Oromocto they descended to the Saint John River. They found this portion of the Saint John River territory to be a broad flat plain, quite favorable for settlement with no obstacles other than the Indians in the area. They returned to Boston with an optimistic recommendation for settlement.

Given the favorable report and in spite of the Royal protection of Wəlastəkwiyik territory, in 1761 Captain Francis Peabody petitioned and was granted authority by the Government of Nova Scotia to survey a twelve-square mile township on the Saint John River, "wherever it might be found fit for improvement." On May 19, 1762, Captain Francis Peabody, Jacob Barker and Israel Perley arrived at the present day city of Saint John and after deeming a number of properties near the harbor unfit for settlement, travelled ninety miles up the river to St Anne’s point. They commenced to survey their township, which was to extend twelve miles below that point. However, Wəlastəkwiyik from a Native village just above St Anne’s, with the help of an interpreter, advised the survey party that "they were trespassers on their rights; that the country belonged to them and unless they retired immediately they would compel them to do so." The survey party replied that they had received authority to survey and settle any land they should choose on the Saint John River. Biding the warning of the Wəlastəkwiyik, the survey party moved downriver to the east bank of the river opposite present day Oromocto Island. There, unbeknownst to the Wəlastəkwiyik, they surveyed a township of 100,000 acres that extended downriver for twelve miles along the east side of the Saint John River. The surveyed area was approximately seventy miles from the river’s mouth centered on what is now Maugerville. Sometime later in 1763 one hundred people, the core of which were disbanded officers and soldiers, accompanied Captain Peabody to the new settlement, named Peabody in his honour. In spite of the 1761 Royal Proclamation prohibiting English settlement on indigenous lands and unbeknownst to the local Wəlastəkwiyik, the English settlement of Peabody had been created.

Peabody’s settlers were a component of approximately 8000 pre-Loyalist New Englanders, who came to the province of Nova Scotia between 1759 and 1768, which at the time included present day New Brunswick. (Note: The term Planter is an English generic term for colonist and is generally used by twentieth-century historians to distinguish this first group of New Englanders coming to the future Maritimes from the loyalists who emigrated from the new republic of the United States subsequent to the American Revolution.) These New Englanders were descendants of the original Puritans from the midlands and south of England. Due to the ever-expanding population in New England, land suitable for farming was becoming scarce. Consequently, the Planters looked to colonial frontiers, such as Nova Scotia, for settlement opportunities. In their quest to find productive farmland Peabody and his fellow settlers were attracted to the immense alluvial plain on the east side of the Saint John River. The flat at one time had been a component of a lake thirty-five miles in diameter of which nearby Grand Lake was the only vestigial remnant. The rich alluvial soils, free of stones, were exceedingly fertile and composed of fine silt laid down over thousands of years by the annual silt-bearing Saint John River freshet.

Within the year the Planter occupation of Peabody Township was under threat. In July 1763, Charles Morris, surveyor-general of Nova Scotia and Henry Newton, both members of the Nova Scotia Executive Council, travelled to the Saint John River and advised the Planter residents, at Peabody, their lands had been reserved for disbanded soldiers from the British Army. In December 1763, with the threat of losing their farmlands, the Peabody Planters petitioned English government officials in London for an official grant of the land. Their petition emphasized their previous service to the King as American militia in the French and Indian War, the fact they had sold their farms in New England and at their own expense relocated families and livestock to the Saint John River settlement. Joshua Mauger, Nova Scotia’s provincial agent in London, lobbied on their behalf. In December 1763 their petition was granted with King George III confirming:

"The Governor of Nova Scotia is ordered to cause the land upon which they are settled to be laid out in a Township consisting of 100,000 acres, 12 miles square, one side to front on the river. Also to reserve a site for a town with a sufficient number of lots, with reservations for a church, town-house, public quays and wharves and other public uses; the grants to be made in proportion to their ability and the number of persons in their families, but not to exceed 1,000 acres to one person. That a competent quantity of land be allotted for the maintenance of a minister and school-master and also one town lot to each of them in perpetuity."

This Royal confirmation marked the creation of the first Crown-approved English settlement on the Saint John River. In respect for Mauger’s assistance the Planters renamed the township Maugerville. Each Planter grantee was formally granted 500 acres of land, forty rods wide and extending one mile back from the Saint John River conditional on them settling on their granted lands with adequate livestock and materials by November 1767. If these conditions were not met the grantees would forfeit their lands.

The Planter settlement on the St John River flourished. By December 1766, a government census revealed there were 261 people in the Maugerville community who were keen to fulfill the obligations of their grants as they possessed 78 oxen and bulls, 145 cows, 156 young cattle and 10 horses. Total crop production for the year, measured in bushels, amounted to wheat 599, rye 1866, beans 145, oats 57, peas 91 and barley 38. A gristmill and a sawmill had been built and the settlers owned two sloops. Due to a lack of adequate streams on Maugerville’s alluvial flat, it is conjectured that windmills located at "Windmill Point," situated opposite Middle Island, powered these first mills. Given the success of the settlement, new settlers from New England continued to arrive. Charles Morris revisited the settlement in 1767, commenting that in spite of never ploughing the land, they were able to grow 20 bushels of corn and wheat per acre simply by harrowing their fields. By the mid 1770s, 80 families were living in Maugerville.

Location on the Saint John River afforded the early settlers in Maugerville access to trade goods from New England. The economy of early Maugerville was centered on agriculture, lumbering, fishing and the fur trade. Settlers were able to produce quantities of agricultural produce beyond the needs of their community. The river contained an abundance of fish and the countryside copious numbers of furbearing animals and wildlife for pelts and skins. Lumbering supplied white and red oak staves for both the lime burning business in Saint John and the rum and molasses trade in the West Indies. In the late 1770s and early 1780s the Maugerville settlers produced wooden structural components, including white ash oar rafters, for the British navy. The products of the local Maugerville economy were bartered for goods supplied by the trading company set up in Saint John, at Portland Point, in the spring of 1764 by James Simonds and James White and others. These merchants carried on business with Newburyport and Boston with boats running between the three ports. During the spring and fall Company sloops went up and down the Saint John River providing Maugerville residents with goods that included everything from a needle to an anchor.

The unofficial settlement of the Township of Maugerville in 1762 not only marked the first English community on the Saint John River but also the initiation of a settler-driven theft of Indian territories by the government of Nova Scotia. As per the terms of the Royal Proclamations of 1761 and 1763, British colonial governors were not authorized to grant lots to settlers on lands not ceded to the British by formal treaty with resident Aboriginal peoples. The problem for Nova Scotia colonial officials was that Indians in Nova Scotia had never ceded any lands to the French prior to their defeat or directly to the British. In 1761, Lieutenant-Governor Jonathan Belcher openly admitted he violated the spirit of the 1761 Proclamation by keeping the provisions of the Proclamation secret from the Indians so as not to awaken "extravagant and unwarrantable demands." Similarly, in contravention of the provisions of the 1763 Proclamation, newly appointed Lieutenant-Governor Montagu Wilmot, in 1764-1765, continued land grants to British settlers without either informing Crown officials in England or Aboriginal peoples in Nova Scotia. By October 1765, colonial settler imperialism had orchestrated the theft of three million acres of Indigenous territory from Native peoples in Nova Scotia, half of that being stolen from the Wəlastəkwiyik along the Saint John River, including the township of Maugerville. All that would be reserved for the Wəlastəkwiyik was a "paltry 704 acres, 700 on the island and mainland at Ekwpakhak plus 4 acres at Sitansisk for a church," just above present day Fredericton.

A generation later many of the Maugerville Planters were displaced farther upriver to Carleton County by newly arrived United Empire Loyalists.

=== Maugerville Rebellion ===
During the American Revolution, in 1776, George Washington sent a letter to the Maliseet of the Saint John River asking for their support in their contest with Britain. Led by Chief Ambroise Saint Aubin, the Maliseets immediately began to plunder the British in the community, burning some of their homes and taking others prisoner back to New England. (Note: The best descriptions of the Maugerville rebellion were made by Charles Godfrey Newland Jadis (See Claim of Charles 24 October 1776, NA AO 13. See also Jadis to Treasury, 30 March 1787, PRO T1/ 644)) (Shortly after, the rebellion continued at the nearby Battle of Fort Cumberland.) In 1779, Maugerville was raided again by Maliseets working with John Allan in Machias, Maine. A vessel was captured and two or three residents' homes were plundered. In response, a blockhouse was built at the mouth of Oromocto River named Fort Hughes (named after the Lt. Governor of NS Sir Richard Hughes).

== See also ==
- List of communities in New Brunswick
