= Stephen Humbert =

Stephen Humbert (ca 1766 – January 16, 1849) was a merchant and politician in New Brunswick. He represented the City of Saint John from 1809 to 1820 and St. John County from 1830 to 1834 in the Legislative Assembly of New Brunswick.

He was born in New Jersey, the son of Stephen Humbert, and became a baker like his father. The family, loyal to Britain, moved to Parrtown (later Saint John, New Brunswick) in 1783. Humbert was also involved in shipping, was a general merchant, owned a book and music shop and operated a singing school. Humbert was a member of the Common Council for Saint John and served in the militia during the War of 1812 and afterward. In 1818, he married his second wife Mary Adams. Humbert was defeated in bids for reelection in 1820, 1827 and 1834. He was a lay leader in the Methodist church at Saint John, publishing a history of Methodism in New Brunswick, and compiled the first English language collection of tunes published in Canada, which included some of his own compositions. Humbert died in Saint John.

Humbert, who himself had frequently crossed the border with the United States to engage in illicit trade, received a commission from the Province to suppress the illegal plaster trade in Passamaquoddy Bay in 1820. The ensuing "Plaster War" was a disaster for Humbert, who was frequently threatened with violence and whose own son was kidnapped by plaster smugglers. New Brunswick's Assembly soon cancelled the plaster regulations.

His son John served as a member of the provincial assembly for King's County.
