= Richard Simonds =

Canadian politician

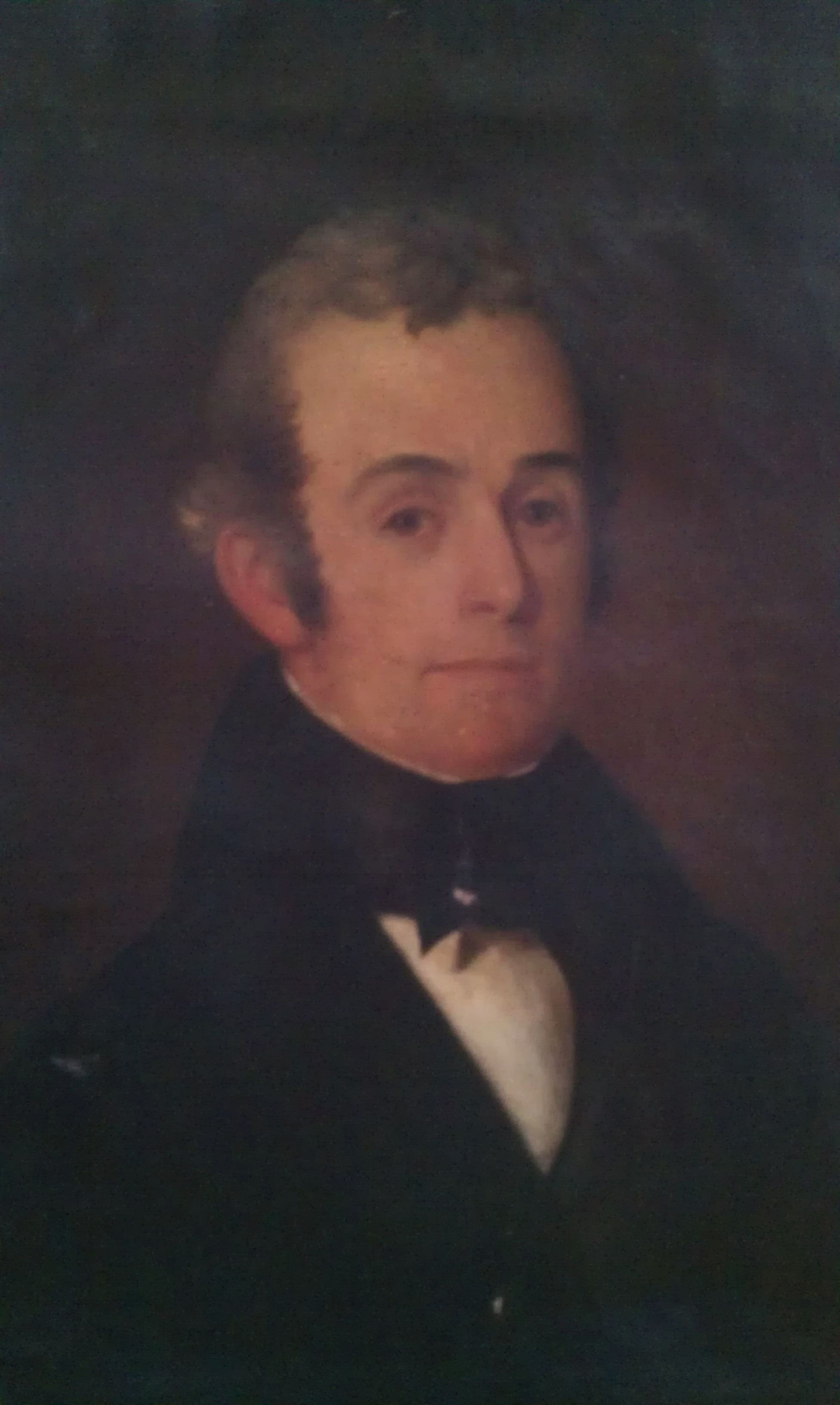
Richard Simonds (1789-1836)

Richard Simonds (April 24, 1789 – May 2, 1836) was a merchant and political figure in the pre-Confederation Province of New Brunswick, Canada. He represented Northumberland County in the Legislative Assembly of New Brunswick from 1816 to 1828.

He was born in Portland (later Saint John, New Brunswick), the son of James Simonds and Hannah Peabody, and was educated there. He went into business with his uncle Francis Peabody at Miramichi in 1810 and also operated his owner business from 1819 to 1824. In 1813, he married Ann Charters. Simonds served as a justice of the peace and justice for the Inferior Court of Common Pleas. In 1824, he moved from Miramichi to Saint John. He was elected Speaker for the Legislative Assembly in 1828 but resigned his seat in December of the same year after being named Provincial Treasurer. His brother Charles replaced him as speaker the following year. In 1829, he married Margaret Walker after the death of his first wife. In 1832, still provincial treasurer, he was named to the Legislative Council of New Brunswick. He died in Saint John at the age of 47.
