= Nancy Morton =

Canadian abolitionist

Nancy Morton was a key figure in the abolition of slavery in New Brunswick, Canada. Morton was an enslaved woman who sought to legally challenge slavery and earn her freedom in the nineteenth century by presenting a case to a court in Fredericton, New Brunswick.

== Trial ==
In 1800, Morton appointed two lawyers to argue on her behalf in a Fredericton court that she should be granted freedom from Caleb Jones, her enslaver. Another source claims that Caleb Jones was acting on behalf of Stair Agnew, Nancy's actual enslaver. A different source claims that Stair Agnew "purchased" Morton for forty pounds in 1791, before "giving" her to Caleb Jones without transferring title.

The trial lasted one year and resulted in a divided decision that forced her to remain under enslavement. After the trial, Morton was "purchased" by William Bailey and enslaved for 15 years before "[disappearing] from history."

=== Trial details ===
Morton was represented pro bono by Ward Chipman and Samuel Denny Street. Chipman sought advice from Sampson Salter Blowers, who had fought to abolish slavery in Nova Scotia alongside Thomas Andrew Lumisden Strange. Blowers suggested to Chipman that "a formal adjudication on the legality of slavery was best avoided in favor of a series of flanking movements."

Jones was represented by five lawyers: Attorney General Jonathan Bliss, John Murray Bliss, Thomas Wetmore, William Botsford and Charles J. Peters.

There were four judges overseeing the case: Chief Justice George Duncan Ludlow, Judge Joshua Upham, Judge Isaac Allen and Judge John Saunders. Judges Allen and Saunders sought to grant Morton freedom from enslavement, while Chief Justice Ludlow and Judge Upham sided with Jones. Judges Allen and Upham were both slave owners.

In a document from 1898 outlining the events of the trial, I. Allen Jack states that Stair Agnew initiated a fight in the courtroom over the arguments being made:

Stair Agnew, at all events, with or without a cause, was do deeply offended with what was said that he seems to have fairly thirsted for blood. He first sent a challenge by John Murray Bliss, one of his counsel, to Judge Allen, and when it was, with the truest courage, declined, invited Mr. Street, who was associate counsel with Mr. Chipman, to meet him in mortal combat. The latter accepted, and he and Mr. Agnew fought, but without fatal result. They and their seconds were indicted, but the case never came to trial, the proceedings being quashed for some irregularity.

Morton's lawyer, Samuel Denny Street, attempted to strike Jones' lawyer John Murray Bliss during the trial.

Chipman argued that slavery was not binding in New Brunswick or Nova Scotia to aid Morton's case, which he later admitted was inaccurate. In a letter to Blowers after the trial, he was grateful that no one had presented the Nova Scotian Act of 1762 for the Regulation of Servants and Slaves, writing: "In searching your laws... I found this clause, but carefully avoided mentioning it." The trial ended in February 1800. On July 18, 1800, a writ was sent to Caleb Jones confirming that "you have the body of Ann otherwise called Nancy a black woman detained in your custody."

Morton's case may have been instrumental in turning public opinion against slavery, which was abolished in Canada in 1834.

== Early life ==
The details of Morton's early life have not been well-documented. A document dated November 13, 1778, executed by John Johnson of Brooklyn, Long Island, New York outlines the "purchase" of a 14-year old Black girl named Nancy, who may be Nancy Morton, to inn-keeper Samuel Duffy for forty pounds. Morton then may have been "purchased" by Stair Agnew, and later Caleb Jones in Maryland, before being sent to New Brunswick in 1785. Some records claim Nancy's name to be Ann.
