= R v Jones (New Brunswick) =

1799 New Brunswick court case on slavery

R v Jones was a 1799 court case challenging the legality of slavery in New Brunswick. The court was unable to reach a consensus, so slavery was not immediately outlawed, but the case influenced public opinion against the institution.

== The case ==
Caleb Jones (c. 1743–1816) was a slave owner and Loyalist who fled north from Maryland to New Brunswick after the American Revolution. In the 1780s, Jones purchased slaves in New York and Maryland and moved them to his farm in New Brunswick where he forced them to labour.

By the end of the 18th century, slavery was increasingly controversial in the British colonies, and a number of prominent New Brunswickers sought to challenge the practice, including Solicitor General Ward Chipman. In 1799 they helped a woman named Nancy (sometimes called Ann) file a writ of habeas corpus challenging her enslavement by Jones. Nancy was represented pro bono by Chipman and Samuel Denny Street, while Jones retained Attorney General Jonathan Bliss, John Murray Bliss, Thomas Wetmore, Charles Jeffery Peters, and William Botsford. Sampson Salter Blowers also advised Nancy's counsel. The case was heard by the full bench of the Supreme Court of New Brunswick: George Duncan Ludlow, Joshua Upham, Isaac Allen, and John Saunders. Saunders was known to oppose slavery, while Ludlow, Upham and Allen all owned slaves themselves.

The case lasted nearly a year, with the court announcing a split decision on 18 February 1800: Ludlow and Upham found in favour of Jones and Allen and Saunders found for Nancy. As no judgment was recorded, Nancy effectively lost her case and was returned to captivity.

A similar case was commenced nearly simultaneously on behalf of another enslaved woman, Mary Morton, against her enslaver, Stair Agnew. R v Agnew did not go to trial and several commentators have conflated the two cases, sometimes referring to the petitioner as Nancy Morton. Agnew, then a member of the legislature, was so incensed by the judges who ruled for Nancy that he challenged Allen to a duel. While Allen declined, Nancy's lawyer, Street, eagerly took his place.

Although Nancy was not freed, the case was considered instrumental in turning public opinion against slavery. In fact, one of the judges, Isaac Allen, manumitted his own slaves after the hearing and a number of other slave owners were apparently persuaded to do the same. By 1820, slavery was essentially extinct in New Brunswick, partly due to the controversy provoked by R v Jones.
