= List of Loyalists (American Revolution) =

Loyalists were colonists in the Thirteen Colonies who stayed loyal to the British Crown during the American Revolutionary War, opposing the Patriots. Many loyalists were slave traders, slave owners, or both.

== A ==
- John Agnew (d. 1812, New Brunswick), served a Church of England parish in Suffolk, Virginia
- Andrew Allen (1740–1825), Pennsylvanian Delegate to the Second Continental Congress
- William Allen (1704–1780), Chief Justice of Pennsylvania, former mayor of Philadelphia, and slave owner
- Brigadier General Benedict Arnold (January 14, 1741 [O.S. January 3, 1740/1741] – June 14, 1801), commissioned in 1780; originally a Patriot general
- John Askin (1739–1815), trader and land speculator at Detroit

== B ==
- John Bacon (died 1783), New Jersey privateer and marauder who preyed on Patriots in and around the Pine Barrens and South East New Jersey
- Thomas Henry Barclay (1753–1830), New York City lawyer and later Governor of Nova Scotia
- Richard Bayley (1745–1801), New York physician and father of American-born saint Elizabeth Ann Seton
- John Beardsley (1732–1809), Anglican minister in Poughkeepsie, New York and Fishkill, New York who, in 1778, he served as chaplain to Beverley Robinson's Loyal American Regiment
- Joseph Bettys, resident of the Town of Ballston, New York; hanged as a spy in 1782
- Christopher Billopp (c.1738 – March 29, 1827), Staten Island resident who commanded a Tory detachment
- Sampson Salter Blowers (March 10, 1742 – October 25, 1842), Boston, Massachusetts attorney
- Amos Botsford (1744–1812), Yale College graduate and judge
- Jonathan Boucher (1738–1804), Church of England priest in Maryland and Virginia and tutor to John Parke Custis, the stepson of George Washington
- William Augustus Bowles (1763–1805), also known as Estajoca, served with the Maryland Loyalist Battalion and was a Maryland-born English adventurer and organizer of Native American attempts to create their own state outside of Euro-American control.
- Joseph Brant Thayendenegea (1743–1807), Mohawk war leader and slave owner
- Molly Brant (c.1736–1796), also known as Mary Brant, Konwatsi'tsiaienni, and Degonwadonti; influential Mohawk leader and sister of Joseph Brant
- Elisabeth Brewer served as a nurse in the Continental Army while covertly gathering information for the British in New Jersey
- Thomas Brown (1750–1825), LTC commanding King's Rangers in Georgia, slave owner
- Brigadier General Montfort Browne (fl. 1760–1780), commanding Prince of Wales American Regiment, 1777
- William Bull II (1710–1791), lieutenant governor of the province of South Carolina, 1759–1775
- Colonel John Butler (1728–1796), commanded Butler's Rangers in the Mohawk Valley
- Walter Butler (1752–1781), Captain in Butler's Rangers; son of John Butler
- Mather Byles (1706–1788), Harvard graduate and prominent Boston clergyman

== C ==
- William Caldwell (c. 1750–1822), Scots-Irish who served in Butler's Rangers
- Benedict Swingate Calvert (c. 1730 to 1732–1788), Judge of the Land Office, slave owner, Maryland
- Elizabeth Calvert (1731 – 1788), wife and cousin of Loyalist politician Benedict Swingate Calvert
- John Camm (1718–1778), seventh president of the College of William and Mary
- Admiral Benjamin Hallowell Carew (1761–1834), Royal Navy Admiral and member of Nelson's band of brothers
- Lt. Col. James Chalmers (died 1806), Commander, First Battalion of Maryland Loyalists; author of anti-"Common Sense" pamphlet "Plain Truth" in 1776, slave owner
- Benjamin Church (1734–disappeared at sea 1778), Director Medical General Patriot Army and a Loyalist spy
- Richard Clarke (1711–1795), Boston merchant
- Christian Daniel Claus (1727–1787), commissioner of Indian affairs
- Cheney Clow (1734–1788), Delaware plantation owner; served earlier as a British officer; involved in an act of hostility on April 18, 1778, which is known today as Cheney Clow's Rebellion
- Sir Isaac Coffin, 1st Baronet (1759–1839), Royal Navy officer and member of a prominent Massachusetts Loyalist family
- John Connolly (c. 1741–1813), planned with Lord Dunmore to raise a regiment of Loyalists and Indians in Canada called the Loyal Foresters and lead them to Virginia to help Dunmore put down the rebellion
- Myles Cooper (1735–1785), Church of England clergyman President of King's College in New York City
- John Singleton Copley (1738–1815), innovative painter
- John Crysler (1770–1852), militiaman, politician, and early settler in Dundas County, Ontario.
- William Cunningham (died 1787, Nassau, Bahamas), earned the name ″Bloody Bill″ for his exploits against Backcountry South Carolina Patriots

== D ==
- James De Lancey (1746–1804), of Westchester County, New York, led a Loyalist unit known as "De Lancey's Cowboys" and was known as the "Outlaw of the Bronx", was also a slave owner
- Brigadier General Oliver De Lancey (1718–1785), commanded De Lancey's Brigade 1776
- Stephen De Lancey (1738–1809), Loyalist lawyer and political figure in New York state and Nova Scotia
- Abraham de Peyster, Officer of King's American Regiment
- Colonel Arent DePeyster (1736–1822), Officer of the 8th Regiment of Foot
- Colonel Andrew Deveaux (1758–1812), Colonel in South Carolina Loyalist militia
- Doan Outlaws, fallen Pennsylvania Quaker family of British spies and bandits
- Sgt. John Dockstader, Royal Yorkers. Married a woman (Catherine) of the Delaware (Lenape)and was granted a 999-year lease for 1200 acres in South Cayuga, Haldimand County Ontario by Chief Joseph Brant.

Captain John Dockstader (uncle of Sgt. John Dockstader. Served as an officer in the Indian Department untill 1783." John was the "notorious" Tory leader of the infamous Indian raid on 9 July 1781 at Currytown, NY.

- Margaret Green Draper (1727–c. 1804), Boston printer and journalist; one of the first American women to run an independent business; United Empire Loyalist; supported the British
- Daniel Dulany the Younger (1722–1797), Mayor of Annapolis, slave owner
- Moses Dunbar (1746–1777), Executed for treason in Connecticut after joining the King's American Regiment

== E ==
- Sir Robert Eden, 1st Baronet, of Maryland (c. 1741–1784), Provincial Governor of Maryland and last Royal Governor of Maryland
- Jacob Ellegood (1742–1801), Virginia-born farmer who became a political figure in early New Brunswick
- Matthew Elliott (loyalist) (1739–1814), British Indian Agent, slave owner

== F ==
- Thomas Fairfax, 6th Lord Fairfax of Cameron (1693–1781), of Virginia; the only British peer resident in Colonial America, slave owner
- David Fanning (1755–1825), commander of militia in North Carolina, and later Member of the Legislative Assembly of New Brunswick, 1791–1801
- Edmund Fanning (1739–1818), commanded militia in the War of the Regulation and Loyalist militia in the American Revolution; later Lieutenant Governor of Nova Scotia and Saint John's Island
- David Farnsworth (died 1778), British agent hanged for his participation in a plot to undermine the American economy by distributing counterfeit currency
- Elizabeth Graeme Fergusson, Loyalist who wrote poems lamenting her husband's desertion of her; these shared the grief of herself and other women left behind
- William Franklin (c. 1730–1813), Governor of New Jersey; son of Benjamin Franklin
- Rebecca Franks (1760–1823), prominent member of Loyalist society in Philadelphia, Pennsylvania during the American Revolution

== G ==
- Grace Growden Galloway (1727–1783), Loyalist who documented her fight for property rights
- Joseph Galloway (1731–1803), Member of the Pennsylvania Provincial Assembly
- Alexander Garden (1720–1791), Scottish-born naturalist who lived in Charles Town, South Carolina until fleeing to London in 1783
- Silvester Gardiner (1708–1786), Massachusetts physician, visionary land developer; in 1774 added his name to a letter addressed to Massachusetts Royal Governor Thomas Hutchinson, affirming his allegiance to the Loyalist cause
- David George (c. 1743–1810), African-American Baptist preacher and a Black Loyalist from the American South who escaped to British lines in Savannah, Georgia; later accepted transport to Nova Scotia and land there; eventually resettled in Freetown, Sierra Leone
- Abraham Gesner (1756–1851), served with the King's Orange Rangers during the American Revolution; purchased a commission of major in the British Army
- Zacharias Gibbs (1736–before 1793), Loyalist militia officer of South Carolina. Veteran of the French & Indian War. Raised to Lieutenant Colonel prior to 1779. He fought at Orangeburg, Ninety-Six, Kettle Creek and other engagements. After the Siege of Charleston, Gibbs fled to East Florida, then to Jamaica, then County Down, Ireland. Died at sea in 1793
- Thomas Gilbert (military officer) Cat. (1714-1797) Fought against the Americans during the Revolutionary War and fled to Canada with his slaves during the Expulsion of the Loyalists.
- Simon Girty (1741–1818), British liaison with the Indians
- John Goodrich (1722–1785), Loyalist privateer
- Captain John Gore (1730–1790), Royal Navy Captain and explorer. Circumnavigated the globe four times, including Cook's first and third Voyages.
- Harrison Gray (1711–1794), wealthy merchant; Treasurer and Receiver-General for the Province of Massachusetts Bay

== H ==
- John Hamilton (died 1816), commander of the Royal North Carolina Regiment, later British consul in Norfolk, Virginia
- Harpe brothers, North Carolina bandits and allegedly America's first serial killers
- Thomas Hickey, a guard in the Commander-in-Chief's Guard of George Washington, who was executed for mutiny and sedition after planning to defect to the British
- John Howe (1754–1835), printer of the Massachusetts Gazette and Boston Weekly News-Letter
- Thomas Hutchinson (1711–1780), last royal Governor of Massachusetts

== I ==
- Charles Inglis (1734–1816), first Bishop of the Anglican Diocese of Nova Scotia
- Ralph Inman (1713–1788), Boston, Massachusetts merchant

== J ==
- Samuel Jarvis (1720–1780), Stamford, Connecticut official forced out of office due to his Loyalism; father of William Jarvis
- William Jarvis (1756–1817), New Yorker who served in the Queen's Rangers
- Edward Jessup (1735–1816), Colonel of Jessup's Loyal Rangers near Albany, New York; and his brothers Ebenezer and Joseph
- Sir John Johnson (1741–1820), commander of the King's Royal Regiment of New York and slave owner
- Caleb Jones (1743–1816), slave owner who fled to Canada after the American Revolution and the Expulsion of the Loyalists, noted for the court case R v Jones (New Brunswick).
- Thomas Jones (1731–1792), Recorder of New York City, 1769–1773; historian who authored History of New York During the Revolutionary War and of the Leading Events in the Other Colonies at That Period; fled to Britain and died in Hoddesdon, Hertfordshire

== K ==
- Boston King (c. 1760–1802), Black Loyalist; settled in Nova Scotia and later emigrated to Sierra Leone, where he helped found Freetown and became the first Methodist missionary to African indigenous people

== L ==
- Elisha Leavitt (1714–1790), Hingham, Massachusetts merchant and landowner
- Sir Egerton Leigh, 1st Baronet (1733–1781), South Carolina colonial official
- Daniel Leonard (1740–1829), son of a Taunton, Massachusetts Patriot; later served as the Chief Justice of the Bermudas
- Isaac Low (1735–1791), delegate for New York to the First Continental Congress in 1774 and to New York Provincial Congress; first President of the New York Chamber of Commerce
- George Ludlow, New York judge

== M ==
- David Mathews, Princeton University graduate and Mayor of New York City; subsequent administrator of Cape Breton, Nova Scotia
- William McCormick (1742–1815), North Carolina merchant
- Colonel Alexander McKee (c. 1735–1799), liaison between the British and the Shawnees
- William Meek (c. 1748–1792), Tory militia man from Spartan District (today's Union County), exiled in 1783, given claim land at Rawdon, Nova Scotia. Wrote to a brother in 1792 that he had sold his land at Rawdon and was to sail to Ireland with Zacharias Gibbs and John Laws, but their ship was lost at sea.
- John Meyers (loyalist) (1745–1821), businessman and slave owner
- Captain Ralph Willett Miller (1762–1799), Royal Navy Captain and member of Nelson's band of brothers
- George Milligan, Surgeon of the Royal Garrison Battalion.
- Benjamin Milliken, founder of Ellsworth Maine, mill and ship owner
- James Moody, Lieutenant, First New Jersey Volunteers, March 1781
- John Murray, Representative to the Great and General Court of the Province of Massachusetts Bay

=== N ===
- Henry Nase - born in what became Connecticut. Fled to avoid being forced by rebels to fight against the king p. Sgt Major eventually Colonel. Kept a diary for the revolutionary war which is in the New Brunswick Museum. For his service he was awarded land in what became St. John New Brunswick. First settler in New Brunswick. Car ferry named after him and the downtown development COL. Henry Nase bolvd. His home and family cemetery remain intact.
- William Nase - brother of Henry. Born in what became Connecticut.

== O ==
- Jonathan Odell (1737–1818), New Jersey Anglican clergyman and Loyalist poet
- Peter Oliver (1713–1791), Massachusetts judge briefly satirized in "McFingal"

== P ==
- Richard Pearis (1725–1794), Indian trader and pioneer settler of Upstate South Carolina
- Frederick Philipse III (1720–1786), militia colonel and politician in New York; last lord of Philipsburg Manor, slave owner

== R ==
- John Randolph (1727–1784), King's Attorney for Virginia
- James Rivington (1734–1802), Loyalist editor of Rivington Gazette; Patriot spy
- Colonel Beverley Robinson (1723–1792), of New York, Loyal American Regiment
- Lieutenant-Colonel Robert Rogers (1731–1795), commander of Rogers' Rangers/Queen's Rangers to 1777 (now The Queen's York Rangers (1st American Regiment) (RCAC)), innovator of ranging tactics
- Timothy Ruggles (1711–1795), colonial military leader, Massachusetts jurist and politician, who served as president of the 1765 Stamp Act Congress

== S ==
- Samuel Seabury (1729–1796) Rival of Alexander Hamilton, Episcopal Bishop, and slave owner
- Peggy Shippen (1760–1804), Philadelphia socialite and second wife of Benedict Arnold
- Philip Skene (1725–1810), colonial New York "patroon" and British officer, of Scottish birth
- Brigadier Cortlandt Skinner (1727–1799), commanded New Jersey Volunteers, September 4, 1776
- Andrew Sprowle (1710–1776), loyalist slave trader and slave owner in Virginia.
- Lieutenant-Colonel William Stark (1724–1776), of New Hampshire; brother of John Stark, a major general in the Continental Army
- George H. Steuart (1700–1784), planter and slave owner; Judge of the Land Office, Maryland
- Joel Stone (1749–1833), Connecticut merchant who helped Loyalists escape to British-controlled part of the Colonies, including David Mathews

== T ==
- Sir Benjamin Thompson (Count Rumford) (1753–1814), of Massachusetts, Royal official and scientist, established the Royal Institution in England.
- Consider Tiffany (1732–1796), Connecticut storekeeper and sergeant during the French and Indian War
- William Tryon (1729–1788), Royal Governor of North Carolina
- Colonel Tye (c. 1753–1780), New Jersey native who escaped from slavery and achieved fame leading a brigade of partisans in raids against Patriots in Monmouth County.

== V ==
- Peter van Schaack (1747–1832), New York lawyer
- John Vardill (1749–1811), New York City-born British spy, clergyman, educator, pamphleteer, playwright, and poet

== W ==
- Thomas Waters (American Revolution) (1735–1813) Colonel for British forces, slave owner
- Sir John Wentworth, 1st Baronet (1737–1820), last Royal Governor of New Hampshire at the time of the American Revolution; Lieutenant-Governor of Nova Scotia
- John Wickham (attorney) (1763–1839), Attorney best remembered for defending Aaron Burr, slave owner
- Charles Woodmason (c. 1720–1789), Church of England missionary in South Carolina, Virginia, and Maryland, diarist, poet, and corresponding member of the Royal Society of Arts, London. He authored an article published (under the pseudonym "Sylvanus") in the South Carolina Gazette and Country-Journal on March 28, 1769, chiding the local Patriot leaders for hypocrisy and asked pointedly how they could justly complain of "No taxation without representation!" regarding Acts of Parliament, while these very same powerful men denied the Carolina Backcountry any representation in South Carolina's Assembly, yet expected them to pay taxes passed by that body.
- James Wright (1716–1785), last Royal Governor of Georgia, buried in Westminster Abbey

== X, Y, Z ==
- John Joachim Zubly (1724–1781), Reformed minister and delegate from Georgia to the Continental Congress

== See also ==
- Loyalists fighting in the American Revolution
- List of American Loyalist Units
