= Edward Winslow (disambiguation) =

Edward Winslow was an American Pilgrim leader on the Mayflower.

Edward Winslow may also refer to:

- Edward Winslow (scholar) (1714–1784), loyalist and government official in Boston
- Edward Winslow (silversmith) (1699–1753)
- Edward Winslow (loyalist) (died 1815), loyalist leader during the American Revolution and New Brunswick politician and judge
- Edward B. Winslow (1846–1936) American industrialist and businessperson from Maine
- Forbes Edward Winslow, eldest son of Forbes Benignus Winslow, vicar of Epping, and rector of St. Paul's, St. Leonard's-on-Sea.
- Edward Francis Winslow (1837–1914), railroad executive and officer in the Union Army during the American Civil War

== Fictional ==
- Eddie Winslow, a character on the television series Family Matters
