= Robert Parker (judge) =

Canadian politician

Robert Parker (June 26, 1796 – November 24, 1865) was a lawyer, judge and political figure in New Brunswick. He represented St. John County in the Legislative Assembly of New Brunswick from 1826 to 1830.

Parker was born in Saint John, New Brunswick, the son of Robert Parker and Jane Hatch, and was educated in Saint John and Windsor, Nova Scotia. He went on to study at King's College, then studied law with Ward Chipman, Jr. and was called to the bar in 1820. In the same year, he married Susan Robinson, the niece of John Robinson and became a director and the solicitor for the Bank of New Brunswick. From 1826 to 1834, he practiced law in partnership with his brother Neville. Parker served as attorney general in 1828 following the death of Thomas Wetmore and became solicitor general later that year after Charles Jeffery Peters was named attorney general. He was also named judge commissary in the vice admiralty court. In 1834, he was named puisne judge in the province's Supreme Court. In 1865, he was named Chief Justice but died a few months later in Saint John.

Legal offices
Preceded by James Carter	Chief Justice of New Brunswick; 1865	Succeeded by William J. Ritchie
