= Joshua Upham =

Canadian judge (1741–1808)

Joshua Upham (November 3, 1741 – November 1, 1808) was a lawyer, judge and political figure in New Brunswick. He served as a member of the New Brunswick Council.

He was born in Brookfield, Massachusetts, the son of Dr. Jabez Upham and Katharine Nichols, and graduated from Harvard College in 1763. He practised law in Brookfield. In 1768, he married Elizabeth Murray. In 1777, when, as a lawyer, he was required to take an oath of allegiance to the American state, he declared himself a loyalist and left for New York City to join the British. (He was subsequently named in the Massachusetts Banishment Act of 1778.) Upham was an officer, ending the war as a major in the King's American Dragoons. He was named a judge in the Supreme Court of New Brunswick in 1784. After the death of his first wife, he married Mary Chandler, the sister of Samuel Chandler and sister-law of Amos Botsford, in 1792. Upham, a slave-owner, voted to uphold the legality of slavery in New Brunswick in 1800 in R v Jones. He died at the age of 66 in London, England, where he had gone to lobby the British government to make the salaries of Supreme Court judges in New Brunswick comparable with those in Upper and Lower Canada.

His daughter Sarah married John Murray Bliss and his daughter Frances married John Wesley Weldon.
