= Daniel Ludlow =

Daniel Ludlow may refer to:

- Daniel H. Ludlow (1924–2009), professor of religion at Brigham Young University
- Daniel Ludlow (banker) (1750–1844), American banker from New York City

== See also ==
- Daniel Ludlow Kuri (born 1961), Mexican politician
