= Attorney General Peters =

Attorney General Peters may refer to:

- John A. Peters (1822–1904), Attorney General of Maine
- Charles Jeffery Peters (1773–1848), Attorney General of New Brunswick
