= Burnt Hills, New York =

- hamlet
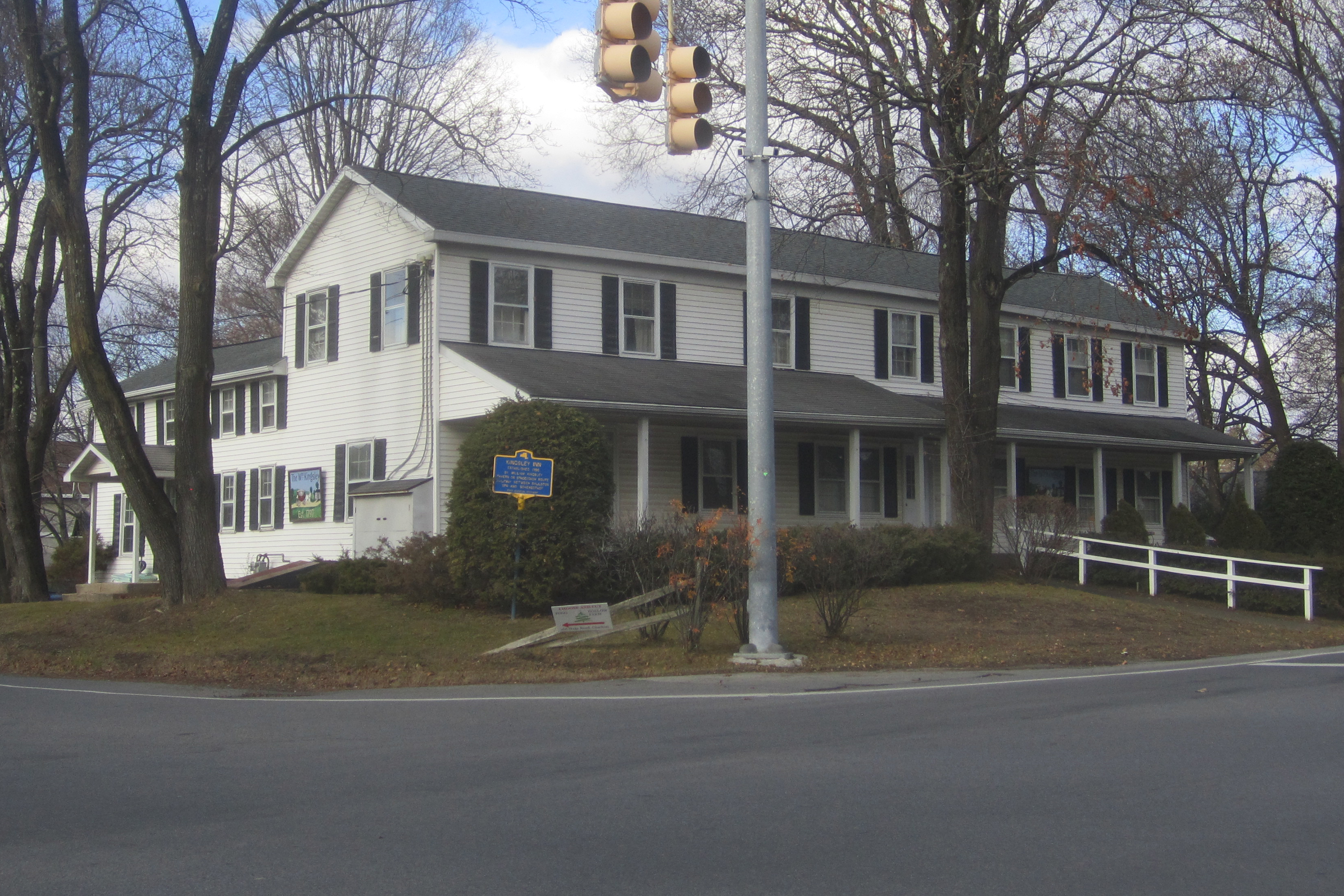
- Historic Kingsley Inn, Burnt Hills New York in 2015

- Location within New York
- Coordinates: 42°54′35″N 73°53′42″W
- Country: United States
- State: New York
- County: Saratoga
- Town: Ballston
- Elevation: 407 ft (124 m)

Population
  - Total: 3,659
- Time zone: UTC-5 (Eastern (EST))
  - Summer (DST): UTC-4 (EDT)
- ZIP code: 12027
- Area code: 518
- GNIS feature ID: 945251

Burnt Hills is a hamlet within the town of Ballston, in Saratoga County, New York, United States. Its ZIP code is 12027. It is situated along NY 50, approximately 14 miles south of downtown Saratoga Springs, and 8.5 miles north of downtown Schenectady. The hamlet and its surrounding areas send their children to schools in the Burnt Hills-Ballston Lake Central School District, affectionately referred to as "BH-BL". The school district's offices are on Lakehill Road within the Burnt Hills hamlet.

== History ==
The hamlet derives its name from the fact that the area was burned over at the time the first settlers arrived. The records of the Burnt Hills Baptist Church extend back to 1791. The father of the notorious Tory spy in the Revolution, Joseph Bettys, was an early settler, and "Bettys Tavern" is located just north. Bettys Tavern burned down in 1998.

== Notable people ==
- Jeff Blatnick (1957–2012), Olympic wrestler, coached wrestling in Burnt Hills
- Alice Mary Dowd (1855–1943), author, poet, and teacher, taught in Burnt Hills
- Brian Emrich (born 1961), musician and composer
- Thomas Lown (1904–1977), boxer, died in Burnt Hills
- Craig Peterson (born 1985), American Football placekicker
- Florence Purington (1862–1950), first dean of Mount Holyoke College
- Gilbert T. Seelye (1877–1962), politician
- Eric Torkelson (born 1952), American football running back, BH-BL graduate
