= Mayflower House Museum =

Coordinates: 41°57′29.3″N 70°39′48.4″W

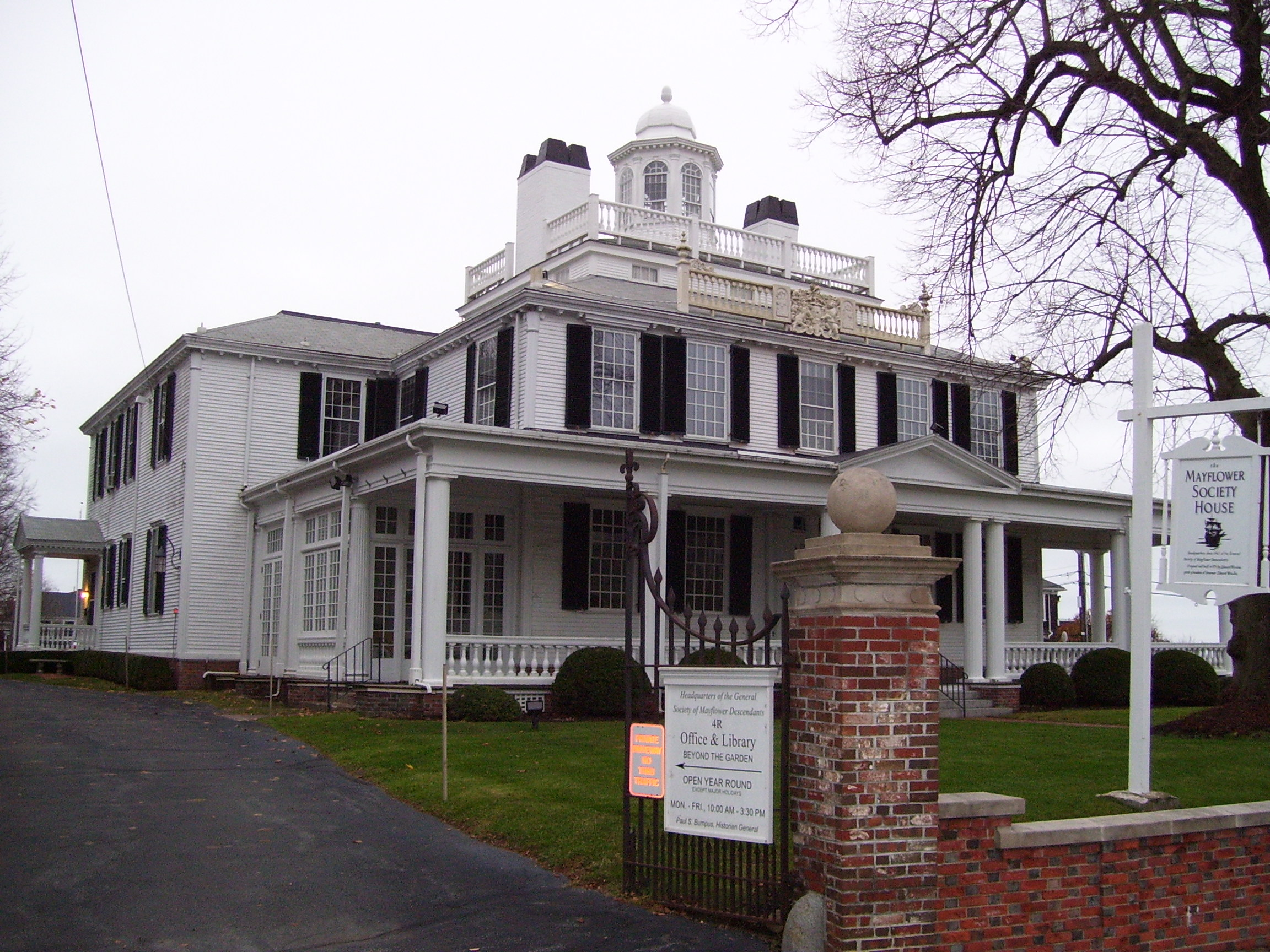
Mayflower House Museum in Plymouth, Massachusetts

The Mayflower House Museum is an 18th-century period historic house museum in Plymouth, Massachusetts operated by The Mayflower Society, also known as the General Society of Mayflower Descendants. The Society purchased the Edward Winslow House in 1941.

The mansion home was originally built in 1754 by Edward Winslow, a loyalist who escaped to Halifax, Nova Scotia. He died shortly after and was buried in the Old Burying Ground (Halifax, Nova Scotia). (His son Edward Winslow made a significant contribution to the establishment of the loyalist colony of New Brunswick.) Winslow was the great-grandson of Edward Winslow, third Governor of Plymouth Colony. The mansion contains 18th century period decorations and furnishings.

On September 14, 1835, Ralph Waldo Emerson married his second wife, Lidian Jackson Emerson in the parlor of The Edward Winslow House.

The offices and library of the Society are located behind the mansion.
