= Stair Agnew (judge) =

Canadian politician

Stair Agnew (October 19, 1757 – October 10, 1821) was a land owner, judge and political figure in New Brunswick, now in Canada. He represented York County in the Legislative Assembly of New Brunswick from 1792 to 1795 and from 1796 to 1821.

Agnew was born in Virginia, the son of the Reverend John Agnew, and was educated in Glasgow, and joined the Queen's Loyal Virginia Regiment at the beginning of the American Revolution. Agnew and his father, a chaplain for the loyalists, were captured in 1781 and released at the end of the war. He went to England where he married Sophia Winifred (last name unknown). In 1789, Agnew settled in New Brunswick near Fredericton. He served as a justice of the peace and a judge of the Inferior Court of Common Pleas for the county from 1799 until his death at his estate in York County in 1821.

Agnew, a slave owner, challenged Judge Isaac Allen to a duel after the judge found in favour of an escaped slave in R v Jones in 1800. Allen refused the challenge. Agnew later fought with Samuel Denny Street, one of the lawyers for the slave.
