= Stephen Sewell (lawyer) =

Canadian politician (1770–1832)

- Born: Stephen Sewall; May 25, 1770; Cambridge, Massachusetts, British America
- Died: June 21, 1832 (aged 62); Montreal, Province of Upper Canada
- Occupations: Lawyer, politician, soldier

Stephen Sewell (May 25, 1770 – June 21, 1832) was a lawyer and political figure in Lower Canada.

He was born Stephen Sewall in Cambridge, Massachusetts in 1770, the son of Jonathan Sewall who was the attorney general of Massachusetts, and returned to England with his family at the start of the American Revolution, where he attended Bristol Grammar School. In 1787, he travelled to New Brunswick where his brother Jonathan had already settled; he articled in law there with Ward Chipman and was called to the bar in 1791. Later in 1791, he moved to Montreal, qualified as a lawyer there and set up practice. Sewell served in the local militia, becoming captain in 1812. In 1809, he was named solicitor general for Lower Canada. He was elected to the Legislative Assembly of Lower Canada in 1809 for Huntingdon and was elected for Montreal East in 1810. In 1815, Sewall was elected a member of the American Antiquarian Society. He was dismissed from his office as solicitor general in 1816 after it was revealed that he had submitted documents published in the Montreal Herald that were critical of Governor George Prevost's administration. Sewell was named King's Counsel in 1827. He served as a commissioner during the construction of the Lachine Canal. Sewell helped found the Natural History Society of Montreal and served as its president. He was the first president of the Montreal bar library and also served as solicitor for the Royal Institution for the Advancement of Learning during the transfer of that part of James McGill's property which became the site of McGill College.

He died of cholera in Montreal in 1832.
