= George Ludlow =

George Ludlow may refer to:

- George Ludlow, 3rd Earl Ludlow (1758–1842), British soldier
- George C. Ludlow (1830–1900), American politician
- George Duncan Ludlow (1734–1808), lawyer and judge
