= Burnt Hills-Ballston Lake Central School District =

School district in New York, United States

Address
- 88 Lakehill Road Burnt Hills, New York, 12027; United States

District information
- Type: Public
- Grades: K–12
- NCES District ID: 3605940

Students and staff
- Students: 3,069
- Teachers: 261.38
- Staff: 302.75
- Student–teacher ratio: 11.74

Other information
- Website: www.bhbl.org

Burnt Hills-Ballston Lake Central School District is a suburban school district headquartered in the Hostetter Leadership Center in Burnt Hills, a hamlet in Ballston, New York. In addition to the Town of Ballston (including the hamlets of Burnt Hills and Ballston Lake), it also serves Charlton, Clifton Park, and Glenville. Today, district enrollment typically hovers between 3,100 pupils to 3,200 pupils, with 400-500 students enrolled in each elementary school, approximately 800 students enrolled at Richard H. O'Rourke Middle School, and about 1,000 students enrolled at the high school.

== History ==
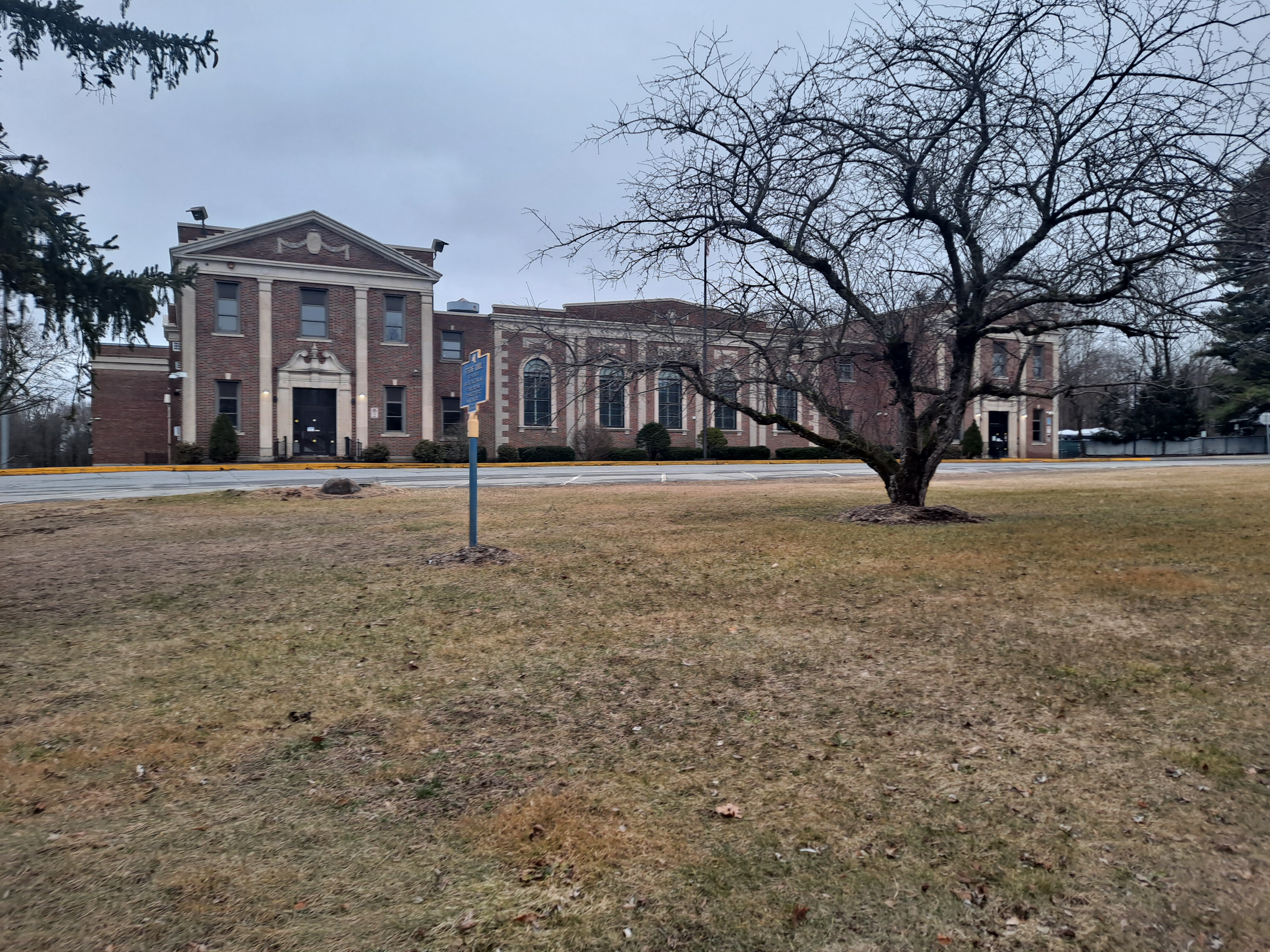
Stevens Elementary School (formerly the Burnt Hills-Ballston Lake Central School)

The district was established in 1915 so residents could have their own local high school instead of paying to send their pupils to surrounding schools. It was formed out of three existing districts, each having one-room schoolhouses, making it the first consolidated school district in the state. Burnt Hills-Ballston Lake School of Agriculture & Homemaking was established in 1916 and the first high school graduation ceremony was held in 1920 for two pupils. In the early 1930s, the front facing side of what was then the Lakehill Road School, and is now Francis L. Stevens Elementary had burnt down, and was rescontructed. Fourteen additional districts joined in the period 1925 to 1962, all of which had one-room schoolhouses.

Many additional buildings were constructed throughout the 1950s. Pashley Elementary, the first building with the intent of teaching grades K-6 was built in 1951 following the post-war baby boom; at this point, many children continued to attend one room schoolhouses. In 1955, the BH-BL High School was built, and the Lakehill Road School was converted into Ballston Lake Elementary School (renamed Francis L. Stevens Elementary in 1967 to honor the district's first superintendent). Next, Glenhaven and Charlton Heights Elementary Schools were built, using the same design in order to save the district money.

In 1961, a final school was constructed, and the Junior High became the third building in the district on Lakehill Road. Throughout the 1960s, every building received a new addition to accommodate for the district's growing enrollment, which peaked at 5,467 students in 1970.

The 1980s and 1990s saw a few more major changes to the district. Sixth grade classes were moved from elementary schools to the Junior High School in 1988, and the building was modified to service pupils grades 6–8. Then, in 1994 the building was renamed to Richard H. O’Rourke Middle School, to honor a long-time superintendent upon his retirement. In 1981, Glenhaven Elementary was closed due to declining enrollment in the district. The space was renamed the Hostetter Administration & Leadership Center, and held the district's administrative office until a water main break led to extensive damage in 2009.

== Racist incidents ==
=== 2013 ===
At the October 2013 homecoming football game against Amsterdam, six to twelve BH-BL students chanted the racial slur "Amsterico," aimed at Amsterdam's larger Latin American population (BH-BL is predominantly white) until the BH-BL head coach Matt Shell addressed the crowd and threatened to forfeit the game. The BH-BL administration apologized to Amsterdam, and promised to address "the recent situation with the entire student body" and use it as "an opportunity to increase our efforts in teaching students the importance of diversity and citizenship."

=== 2026 ===
On February 11, 2026, at Richard O'Rourke Middle School, a white substitute English teacher said "keep your cotton-picking hands to yourself" to a Black eighth-grader. The district launched an investigation and the next day removed the teacher from the substitute teacher roster.

== Rankings and statistics ==
Burnt Hills-Ballston Lake High School is ranked #6 out of 47 schools in the Albany, NY Metro Area by U.S. News & World Report. It is also ranked #2,204 nationally, placing it in the top 12.5% of ranked American high schools.

== Schools ==
Secondary:

- Burnt Hills-Ballston Lake High School
- Richard H. O'Rourke Middle School

Primary:

- Charlton Heights Elementary School
- Pashley Elementary School
- Francis L. Stevens Elementary School

== Curriculum ==
Burnt-Hills-Ballston Lake High School offers the following Advanced Placement Classes (offering during a given time subjective to student interest):

- AP Biology
- AP Calculus AB
- AP Calculus BC
- AP Chemistry
- AP Computer Science A
- AP Computer Science Principles
- AP English: Literature & Composition
- AP Environmental Science
- AP European History
- AP Macroeconomics
- AP Statistics
- AP U.S. History
- AP U.S. Government & Politics
- AP World History: Modern

Burnt Hills-Ballston Lake also has agreements with multiple academic institutions to grant college credit for classes offered in the high school; these include Schenectady County Community College, University at Albany, SUNY, Siena University (New York), State University of New York College of Environmental Science and Forestry, State University of New York at Oswego, Hudson Valley Community College, and Russell Sage College.

== Notable alumni ==
=== Athletics ===
- Eric Torkelson, football player
- Jason Morris, wrestler
