= Isaac Allen =

Canadian officer and jurist (1741–1806)

- Born: 1741
- Died: 1806 (aged 64–65)

Isaac Allen (1741–1806) was a Canadian jurist in New Brunswick.

Isaac Allen was a loyalist officer during the American Revolutionary War, who at the close of the war held the rank of colonel and commanded the 2d battalion of New Jersey volunteers. He was deported to New Brunswick with other tories, and obtained a grant of 2,000 acres above Fredericton. He was one of the first judges appointed in the province, having been made an assistant justice in 1784. In a test case to determine the right to hold slaves, R v Jones tried at Fredericton in 1800, he decided with Judge John Saunders against the master, while the chief justice and another judge upheld the master's right. As a result of this trial, he received a challenge to a duel from Stair Agnew. His grandson, John C. Allen, became chief justice of New Brunswick.
