= Daniel Ludlow (banker) =

American merchant and banker

President of the Manhattan Company
- In office 1799–1808
- Preceded by: Inaugural holder
- Succeeded by: Henry Remsen

Personal details
- Born: August 2, 1750 New York City, Province of New York, British America
- Died: September 26, 1814 (aged 64) Skaneateles, New York, U.S.
- Spouse: Arabella Duncan (m. 1773)
- Relations: George Duncan Ludlow (half-brother); Gulian Verplanck (cousin)
- Children: 11
- Parent(s): Gabriel Ludlow; Elizabeth Crommelin Ludlow

Daniel Ludlow (August 2, 1750 – September 26, 1814) was an American merchant and banker who served as the first president of the Manhattan Company, which, after a series of mergers became JPMorgan Chase.

== Early life ==
Ludlow was born on August 2, 1750, in New York City to a long-established and wealthy New York family. He was the son of Gabriel Ludlow (1704–1773), a merchant, and Elizabeth (née Crommelin) Ludlow (1715–1760). His sister, Elizabeth Ludlow, was the wife of Francis Lewis Jr. (brother of Gov. Morgan Lewis). From his father's first marriage to Frances Duncan, he had an elder half-brother, George Duncan Ludlow, who was appointed the first Chief Justice of New Brunswick in Canada in 1784. Another half-brother, Gabriel George Ludlow, was the first mayor of Saint John, New Brunswick (and the grandfather of Edward Hunter Ludlow).

The first Ludlow in America from his line was his grandfather, also named Gabriel Ludlow (1663–1736), who was born at Castle Cary and left Frome around 1694 to settle in New Amsterdam, and became a prominent and influential merchant, shipowner, landholder and longtime clerk of the New York General Assembly. He obtained a patent from King George II for a tract of 4,000 acres of land in what became Orange County, New York, on the west bank of the Hudson River. His grandfather's grandfather, Thomas Ludlow, was the brother of both Gabriel Ludlow, Receiver of the Duchy of Lancaster during the reign of King Charles I, and Roger Ludlow, Deputy Governor of the Massachusetts Bay Colony. Through his maternal aunt, Mary (née Crommelin) Verplanck, he was a first cousin of Gulian Verplanck, Speaker of the New York State Assembly who became president of the Bank of New York and in 1792 helped found the Tontine Association (a precursor of the New York Stock Exchange).

The wealth and status of the Ludlow family gave Daniel and his elder half-brothers "several advantages, including education in a private school."

== Career ==
In 1765, his father sent him to Amsterdam in the Netherlands, to enter the counting house of Crommelin & Zoon, where his grandfather Charles Crommelin was a leader. During his five year tenure with the firm, Ludlow learned French, German, and Dutch in addition to learning the fundamentals of banking. After returning to New York around 1770, he joined his father’s mercantile business, which he took over after his father died in 1773.

During the American Revolution, Ludlow was a Loyalist. Regarded as "arch-tory to the core," his older brothers apparently "had no choice but to leave New York when the revolution was over," though Daniel, remained and become a successful businessman. In 1783, following the end of the war, he joined the Chamber of Commerce.

On January 1, 1784, he entered into a partnership with Edward Goold. In their first advertisement, a circular letter, they were vague about their line of business, but promised "to contribute to the Success of whatever Concerns may be entrusted to our Charge." The firm likely imported goods on commission and on their own account were involved in marine insurance. In 1790, Ludlow dissolved the partnership to join his nephew, Gulian Ludlow, under the firm name Daniel Ludlow & Company. The company which was in business for fifteen years, was a marine insurer and a major importer of East India goods. It suffered significant underwriting losses during the Quasi-War with France in 1798, but recovered with the assistance from the bank of the Manhattan Company.

In 1799, Ludlow became the first president of the Manhattan Company, which had been founded by Aaron Burr. Among the company's original stockholders were such men as Nicholas Fish, John Delafield, John Jacob Astor, Richard Varick, Stephen Van Rensselaer, Rev. John Rodgers, Joshua Sands, Peter Stuyvesant, George Clinton, Israel Disosway, John Slidell, Henry Rutgers, and Daniel Phoenix. In July 1800, the Bank started paying dividends and, in 1808, the company sold its waterworks to the city, pocketing $1.9 million dollars, and turned completely to banking. The same year, Henry Remsen, succeeded Ludlow as president of the company.

In 1810, Ludlow moved to Skaneateles, New York, when he purchased an extensive estate from Jacobus Annis (later known as the Anson Lapham place).

== Personal life ==
On October 4, 1773, Ludlow married Arabella Duncan, a daughter of Thomas Duncan and Mary (née Ketcham) Duncan. In 1757, the Duncan home, a 3-storey house in Pearl Street (then known as Queen Street), caught fire and burned to the ground, killing her mother and seven siblings in the nursery on the third floor. Only Arabella, her father and her sister Frances escaped. Frances later married their cousin and Daniel's elder half-brother, George Duncan Ludlow, in 1758. Their daughter, Frances Duncan Ludlow, was the second wife of Richard Harison, a law partner of Alexander Hamilton who served as the Recorder of New York City and the 1st U.S. Attorney for the District of New York. Together, the couple eleven children, five of whom lived to maturity, including:

- Harriet Ludlow (b. 1774), who married Grove Wright, a New York merchant.
- Daniel Ludlow Jr. (1779–1827), who became a partner in Daniel Ludlow & Co. and who died unmarried.
- Robert Crommelin Ludlow (b. 1789), who married Mary Peters of Charleston, South Carolina.
- Ferdinand Ludlow (b. 1790), a Lt. in the U.S. Navy, who died unmarried in Florence, Italy.
- Edward Greenleaf Ludlow (1793–1877), a physician who married his cousin Mary Kennedy Lewis, a daughter of John Lewis and great-granddaughter of Francis Lewis, a signer of the Declaration of Independence, in 1828. After her death, he married Mrs. Van Horne.

His wife Arabella died on December 7, 1803. Ludlow died at his country home at Skaneateles, New York, on September 26, 1814.

=== Descendants ===
Through his eldest daughter Harriet, he was a grandfather of Henry Allen Wright, who married his cousin Louisa Ludlow Auchmuty (1805–1896), a resident of Newport, Rhode Island, for fifty years.

Through his son Edward, he was a grandfather of Arabella Duncan Ludlow (1844–1926), who married Edward Sherman Gould (1837–1905), a son of author Edward Sherman Gould.
