= Chief Justice of New Brunswick =

The Chief Justice of the Province of New Brunswick, Canada holds the highest office within the Province's judicial system. The Chief Justice is a member of the Court of Appeal, the highest court in the Province. The governor general in Council appoints the Chief Justice and other judges of the Appeals Court.

The Chief Justice is traditionally consulted before any government decision that would alter the administration of justice.

The position is currently vacant. J.C. Marc Richard, chief justice from 2018, announced he was stepping down effective August 1, 2026.

== Historical list of chief justices of New Brunswick ==
Chief Justice	Term
George D. Ludlow	1784–1808
Jonathan Bliss	1809–1822
John Saunders	1822–1834
Ward Chipman	1834–1851
Sir James Carter	1851–1865
Robert Parker	1865–1865
William J. Ritchie	1865–1875
Sir John C. Allen	1875–1896
William H. Tuck	1896–1908
Frederick E. Barker	1908–1913
Ezekiel McLeod	1914–1917
Sir J. Douglas Hazen	1917–1935
John B. M. Baxter	1935–1946
Charles D. Richards	1946–1955
John B. McNair	1955–1964
George F. G. Bridges	1964–1972
Charles J. A. Hughes	1972–1984
Stuart G. Stratton	1984–1992
William L. Hoyt	1993–1998
Joseph Z. Daigle	1998–2003
J. Ernest Drapeau	2003–2018
J.C. Marc Richard	2018–2026
