= Old Burial Ground (Fredericton) =

Cemetery in New Brunswick, Canada

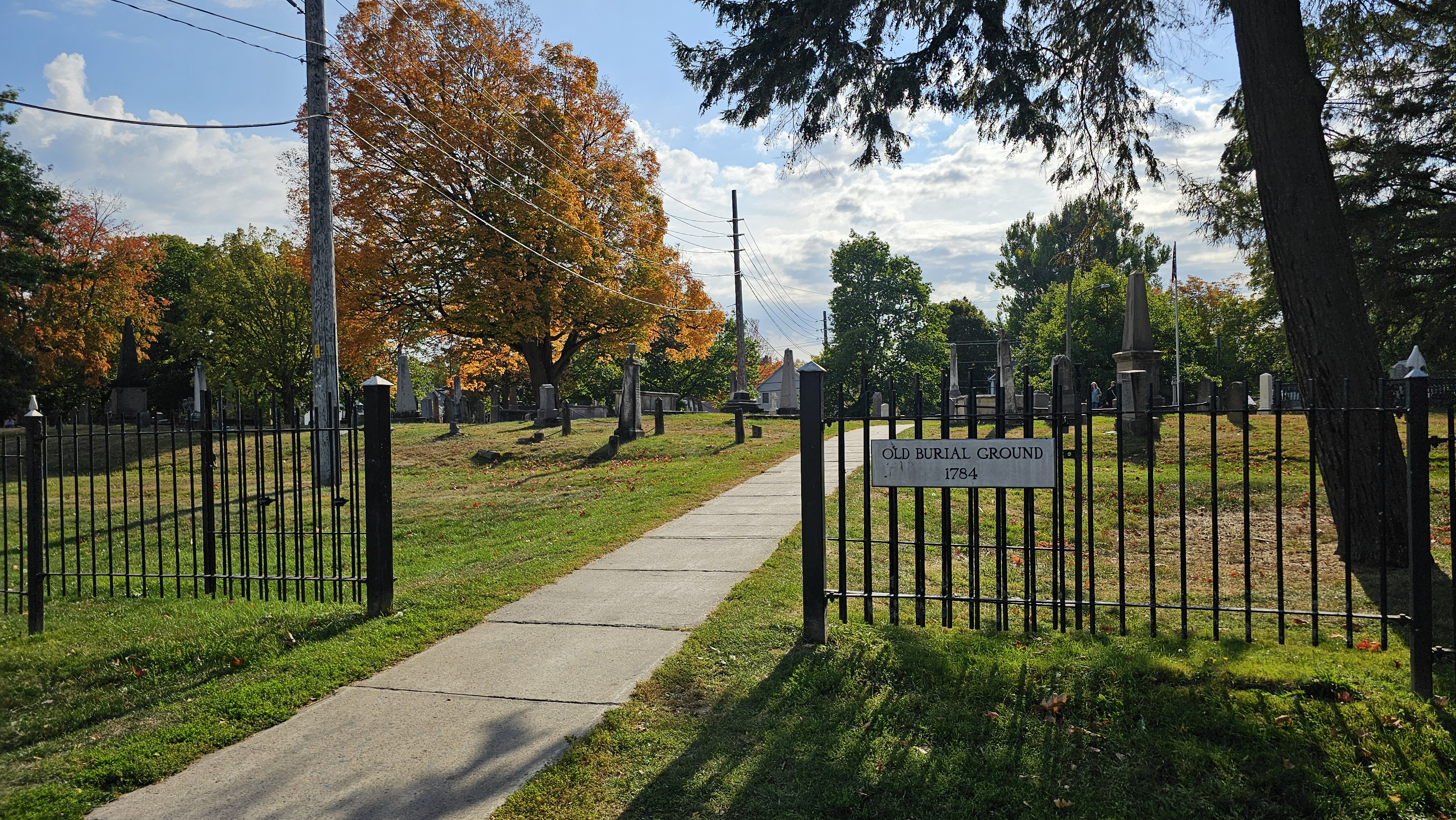
The cemetery in 2025.

The Old Burial Ground is an historic cemetery in Fredericton, New Brunswick, Canada. Located between Brunswick and George Streets in downtown Fredericton, Heritage Fredericton calls it "the most historically important cemetery in New Brunswick." The first cemetery was officially established in 1784 and the recorded burial occurred in 1787. It is the burial site for many of the Loyalist families which founded the province.

== Notable burials ==
- Rebecca Agatha Armour, teacher and writer
- George Duncan Ludlow, judge
