= Massachusetts Banishment Act =

1778 state act

The Massachusetts Banishment Act, officially named the "Banishment Act of the State of Massachusetts", was passed in September 1778 "to prevent the return to this state of certain persons therein named and others who have left this state or either of the United States, and joined the enemies thereof." Over 300 people, including many former officials of the Province of Massachusetts Bay, were listed in the act.

== Notable people banished ==
- Sir Francis Bernard, former provincial governor
- Daniel Bliss, lawyer and court of common pleas judge
- Jonathan Bliss, lawyer and justice of the peace
- Sampson Salter Blowers, lawyer, friend of Benedict Arnold
- Benjamin Church, physician and convicted spy
- Thomas Cutler, lawyer
- John Fleming, printer, publisher, and bookseller
- Sylvester Gardiner, physician and merchant
- Bradford Gilbert, merchant
- Harrison Gray, treasurer of the province
- Joseph Green, poet and businessman
- John Howe, printer and writer
- Thomas Hutchinson, former provincial governor
- John Jeffries, physician and military surgeon
- Ephraim Jones, military commissary
- Richard Lechmere, namesake of Lechmere Square
- Daniel Leonard, lawyer
- Joshua Loring, member of the Governor's Council
- Daniel Murray, militia soldier of King's American Dragoons
- Peter Oliver, Chief Justice of the Superior Court
- Thomas Oliver, former provincial lieutenant governor
- Robert Pagan, merchant involved in shipbuilding
- William Paine, physician
- Sir William Pepperrell the younger, merchant
- Benjamin Pickman Sr., merchant
- James Putnam, lawyer and former Attorney General
- Isaac Royall, real estate investor, slave trader
- Timothy Ruggles, member of the Stamp Act Congress
- Jonathan Sewall, lawyer and former Attorney General
- Joshua Upham, lawyer
- Edward Winslow, government official and peace officer
