= Dow v Black =

Canadian constitutional law case – 1875

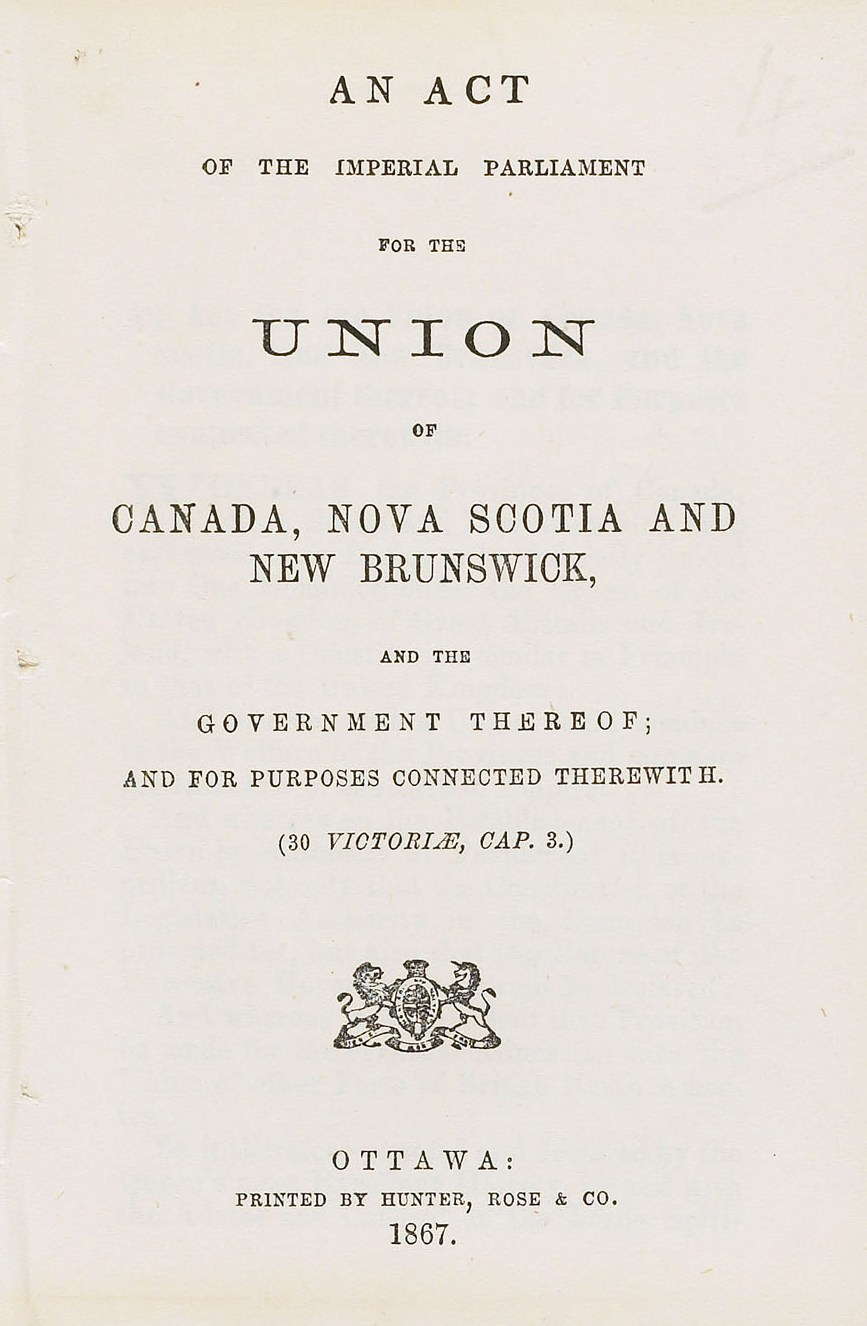
- The British North America Act, 1867 set out the powers of the federal and provincial governments
- Court: Judicial Committee of the Privy Council
- Full case name: James Dow and others v William T. Black and others
- Decided: March 5, 1875
- Citations: (1874-75), 6 AC 272, [1875] UKPC 17, 1 Cart BNA 95 (PC)

Case history
- Prior actions: The Queen v. Dow (1873), 14 NBR 300, 1 Cart BNA 108 (NB SC)
- Appealed from: Supreme Court of New Brunswick

Court membership
- Judges sitting: Sir James W. Colville; Lord Justice James; Lord Justice Mellish; Sir Montague E. Smith

Case opinions
- Province can enact a law authorising municipality to fund an inter-provincial railway
- Decision by: Sir James W. Colvile

Keywords
- Constitutional law; division of powers; inter-provincial railways; direct taxation; matters of a local and private nature

R v Dow
- Court: Supreme Court of New Brunswick
- Full case name: The Queen v Dow and others
- Decided: February 22, 1873
- Citations: (1873), 14 NBR 300, 1 Cart BNA 108 (NB SC)

Case history
- Appealed to: Judicial Committee of the Privy Council
- Subsequent action: Appeal allowed

Court membership
- Judges sitting: Ritchie C.J. Allen J. Weldon J. Fisher J.

Case opinions
- Province cannot enact a law authorising municipality to fund an inter-provincial railway
- Decision by: Allen J.; Ritchie C.J. and Weldon J. concurring Fisher J. (dissenting)

Keywords
- Constitutional law; division of powers; inter-provincial railways; direct taxation; matters of a local and private nature

Dow v Black is a Canadian constitutional law decision. Decided in 1875, it was one of the first major cases examining in detail the division of powers between the federal Parliament and the provincial Legislatures, set out in the Constitution Act, 1867 (originally known as the British North America Act, 1867). The issue was whether a provincial statute which authorised the municipality of St. Stephen, New Brunswick to issue a debenture to fund a railway connecting to the United States was within provincial jurisdiction as a local tax matter, or whether it intruded on federal jurisdiction over inter-provincial and international railways.

The case was decided by the Judicial Committee of the Privy Council, at that time the court of last resort for Canada within the British Empire. The Judicial Committee allowed an appeal from the Supreme Court of New Brunswick and held that the legislation was within provincial jurisdiction as a matter of local taxation, coming under sections 92(2) and 92(16) of the Constitution Act, 1867. The statute did not intrude on federal jurisdiction over inter-jurisdictional railways, under s. 91(29) and s. 92(10) of the Constitution Act, 1867.

The case is included in a collection of significant constitutional decisions from the Judicial Committee, published by the federal Department of Justice.

== Facts ==
St. Stephen is a town in Charlotte County, in southern New Brunswick. Debec, New Brunswick is north of St. Stephen, in Carleton County on the border with the United States. Houlton, Maine is close to Debec, some 125 km north-west of St. Stephen.

In June 1867, a few weeks before the Constitution Act, 1867 came into effect, the Legislature of New Brunswick passed an Act incorporating the Houlton Branch Railway Company, authorising it to build a railway from Debec to the international border with the United States, connecting with Houlton. The proposed branch line would also connect to the St. Andrews and Quebec Railway, which eventually became the New Brunswick and Canada Railway.

In 1870, the town of Houlton offered a bonus of $30,000 to any company which would build a railway connecting Houlton with the terminus of the New Brunswick and Canada Railway near Debec, to be completed by the end of 1872. The Houlton Branch Railway Company was prepared to build the railway, on condition that the town of St. Stephen also pay a bonus of $15,000. The proposed railway would not extend to St. Stephen, but would connect to existing railways which connected to St. Stephen.

The New Brunswick Legislature then passed an Act authorising the county of Charlotte to issue debentures to raise the $15,000, to be paid by municipal assessments on the real and personal property of the inhabitants of St. Stephen, provided a majority of two-thirds of the ratepayers of St. Stephen approved the debenture. After the Act was passed, on August 11, 1870 there was a meeting of the ratepayers of St. Stephen, as required by the statute. A majority voted in favour of the proposal and the County of Charlotte issued the debentures. The general sessions of the County of Charlotte then laid the necessary assessment on the residents of St. Stephen to pay the interest on the debentures.

Some residents of St. Stephen who opposed the debenture then challenged the assessment in the New Brunswick courts. The lead plaintiff was William T. Black, a local doctor, while the proponents of the debenture were represented by James Dow, the mayor of St. Stephen and editor of the St. Stephen Journal.

== Decision of the New Brunswick Supreme Court ==
=== Summary ===
The challenge was brought by way of an application for certiorari in the Supreme Court of New Brunswick to quash the warrant of assessment, on the grounds that the provincial Act related to a railway extending beyond the limits of the Province and was therefore not within the constitutional authority of the Legislature of New Brunswick. In Trinity term 1872, the Supreme Court granted an interim rule nisi to quash the warrant of assessment. In the fall of 1872, the Supreme Court heard argument and reserved judgment on whether to confirm that initial decision. On February 22, 1873, in a 3-1 decision the Court held that the Act was unconstitutional and granted a rule absolute to quash the warrant of assessment.

=== Majority decision of Justice Allen ===
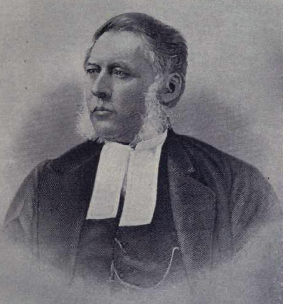
Justice John Campbell Allen, whose judgement was overturned by the Judicial Committee.

Mr. Justice Allen delivered the majority decision of the Court. He held that there was no doubt that the railway extended beyond the province of New Brunswick, and therefore fell under exclusive federal jurisdiction under the combined effect of s. 92(10)(a) and s. 91(29) of the Constitution Act, 1867. Since the purpose of the provincial statute was to provide for the construction and completion of a railway extending beyond the limits of the province, it fell within federal jurisdiction. The funds were necessary to the completion of the railway. If the act were within provincial jurisdiction, the Province would have the power to secure the existence or completion of inter-jurisdictional undertakings.

=== Dissenting opinion of Justice Fisher ===
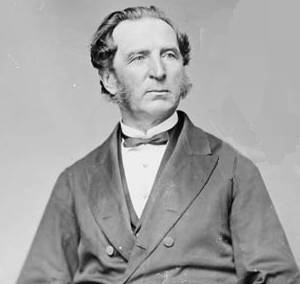
Justice Charles Fisher, whose dissenting judgement was upheld by the Judicial Committee.

Mr. Justice Fisher dissented. Prior to his appointment to the court, he had been a Father of Confederation and participated in both the Quebec Conference and the London Conference which had produced the terms of Confederation and the text of the Constitution Act, 1867. He distinguished between the pre-Confederation New Brunswick statute which incorporated the railway company and the subsequent statute authorising the town of St. Stephen to contribute to the financing of the railway. The pre-Confederation statute remained in force by virtue of s. 129 of the Constitution Act, 1867. That statute was the authority for the construction of the railway. The subsequent statute simply provided a way for the inhabitants of St. Stephen to contribute to the construction of that portion of the railway which was within New Brunswick. In his opinion, that financial arrangement was a purely local matter and therefore would be within provincial jurisdiction. He would have ruled the statute was constitutional.

== Decision of the Judicial Committee ==
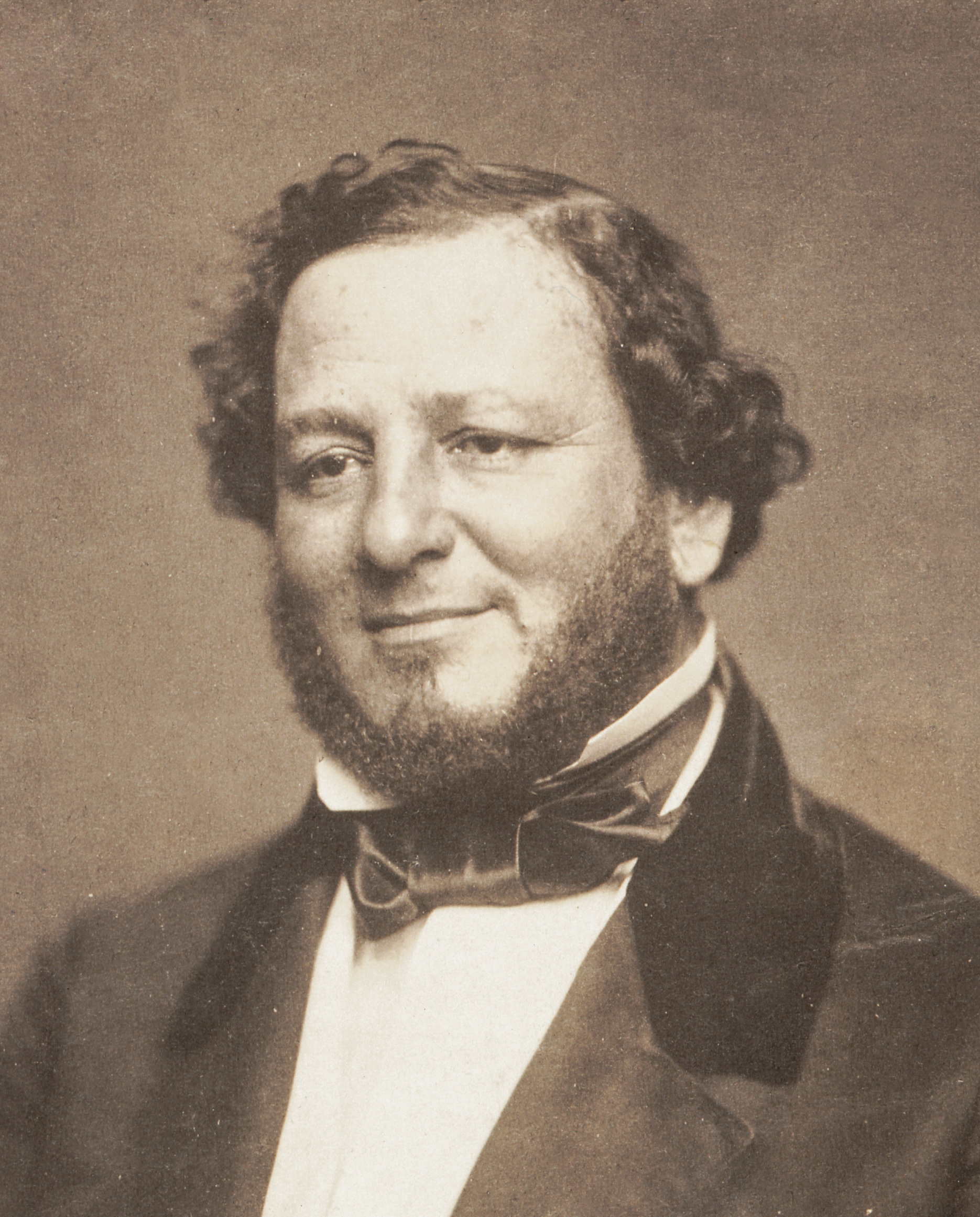
Judah P. Benjamin, QC, Counsel for the appellants

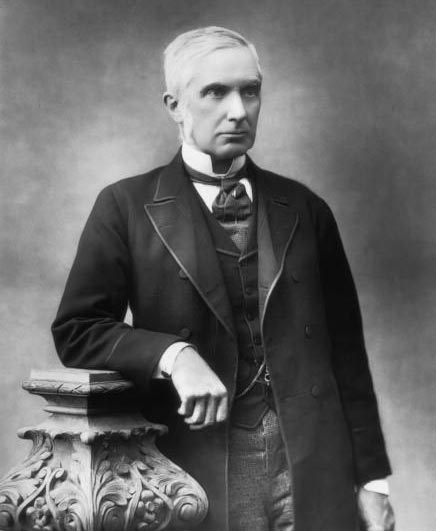
Edward Fry, QC, counsel for the respondents.

The supporters of the railway proposal then appealed to the Judicial Committee of the Privy Council, at that time the court of last resort for Canada within the British Empire. (The Supreme Court of Canada had not yet been created.) Judah P. Benjamin, Q.C. (former Attorney General of the Confederate States of America) and William Grantham acted for the appellants. Edward Fry, Q.C., and Mr Bompas acted for the respondents.

On March 5, 1875, the Judicial Committee allowed the appeal, ruling that the New Brunswick Act was within provincial authority. Sir James W. Colvile wrote the decision for the Committee. He held that the provincial Act did not relate to inter-provincial railways, a subject matter reserved to the federal Parliament by s. 91(29) and 92(10) of the Constitution Act, 1867. It was true that the railway company itself had been incorporated by an Act of the New Brunswick Legislature, shortly before the Constitution Act, 1867 came into force. However, the taxation statute in issue in the appeal did not relate to the construction of the railway, nor did it any way affect the corporate structure of the railway company. It simply enabled the majority of the inhabitants of the parish of St. Stephen to raise a subsidy for the railway by local taxation.

The Committee also rejected a second argument, namely that the taxation powers of the province were restricted to general powers to tax throughout the province and could not be used to authorise taxes for a local municipal purpose. The Province's taxation powers under s. 92(2) of the Constitution Act, 1867 are not so limited. Alternatively, even if the tax did not fall within s. 92(2), it would clearly be a law of a local or private nature within the meaning of s. 92(16) of the Constitution Act, 1867, and therefore within provincial authority on that basis.

As was the practice of the Judicial Committee at that time, Colville gave the decision for the entire committee, with no reasons from any of the other judges.

== Significance of the decision ==
Following the abolition of Canadian appeals to the Judicial Committee, the Minister of Justice and Attorney General of Canada directed the Department of Justice to prepare a compilation of all constitutional cases decided by the Judicial Committee on the construction and interpretation of the British North America Act, 1867 (now the Constitution Act, 1867), for the assistance of the Canadian Bench and Bar. This case was included in the three volume collection of constitutional decisions of the Judicial Committee.
