= James Carter (judge) =

British lawyer and judge (1805–1878)

Sir James Carter (25 January 1805 – 10 March 1878) was a British lawyer and judge. He was Chief Justice of New Brunswick from 1851 to 1865.

== Biography ==
Born in Portsmouth, England, the son of British Army Captain James Carter who once was mayor of Portsmouth, Carter was educated in Walthamstow where one of his schoolmates was Benjamin Disraeli. He also attended Manchester College, York and Trinity College, Cambridge, where he was a Cambridge Apostle. He was called to the bar in 1832 and was appointed in 1834 Chief Justice of New Brunswick by the Secretary of State for War and the Colonies Thomas Spring-Rice. He resigned in 1865 and returned to England.

== Personal life and death ==
Carter was married three times, his first wife, Emma, was the daughter of Charles Wellbeloved. He died in 1878 at Mortimer Lodge, Berkshire.

Legal offices
Preceded by Ward Chipman	Chief Justice of New Brunswick; 1834–1851	Succeeded by Robert Parker
