= John Campbell Allen =

Canadian politician

Sir John Campbell Allen
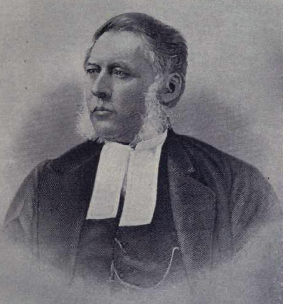

Member of the Legislative Assembly of New Brunswick
- In office 1856–1865

Personal details
- Born: October 1, 1817 Kingsclear Parish, York County, New Brunswick
- Died: September 27, 1898 (aged 80) Fredericton, New Brunswick

Sir John Campbell Allen (October 1, 1817 – September 27, 1898) was from 1865–1896 a justice of the colonial and then provincial Supreme Court of New Brunswick, serving as Chief Justice of New Brunswick from 1875 to 1896.

He was born in Kingsclear Parish, New Brunswick, a grandson of Isaac Allen, a New Brunswick Supreme Court judge. He studied law in the office of John Simcoe Saunders.

He was a member of the New Brunswick House of Assembly from 1856 to 1865, Solicitor General in 1856 to 1857, Speaker of the House from 1863 to 1865, and Attorney General in 1865.

In 1873, he gave the majority decision of the New Brunswick Supreme Court in Dow v. Black, a significant constitutional law case dealing with the federal-provincial division of powers. He held that a provincial statute dealing with municipal taxation was unconstitutional. However, his decision was overturned on appeal by the Judicial Committee of the Privy Council, at that time the court of last resort for the British Empire.

== See also ==
- Louis Mailloux Affair

Legal offices
Preceded by William J. Ritchie	Chief Justice of New Brunswick; 1875–1896	Succeeded by William H. Tuck
