= J.C. Marc Richard =

Chief Justice of New Brunswick

Chief Justice of New Brunswick
- In office May 4, 2018 – August 1, 2026
- Appointed by: Justin Trudeau
- Prime Minister: Justin Trudeau
- Preceded by: J. Ernest Drapeau

Personal details
- Born: August 22, 1958 in Moncton, New Brunswick

J.C. Marc Richard is a Canadian judge. He was formerly the Chief Justice of New Brunswick, from 2018 to 2026. He will continue in office as a judge of the Court of Appeal of New Brunswick. Prior to appointment to the court, he practised as a lawyer. He was previously president of the Canadian Bar Association and the Law Society of New Brunswick.

== Biography ==
Richard was born in Moncton, New Brunswick, the son of Rheal Richard and Florine Gallant. He is married to Sabra Livingstone, and has one daughter.

He graduated from the Universite de Moncton with a BBA in 1980, and an LLB in 1983, and received his LL.M. from the London School of Economics and Political Science.

Richard has worked on judicial reform in Moldova and Mongolia.

Richard is a co-author of the 2025 paper "Access to Knowledge as a Requirement for Access to Justice in New Brunswick".

== Career ==
Admitted to the Bar in 1985, Richard worked as Crown Prosecutor before working litigation with Barry & O'Neil law firm. In 2002, Richard represented the Law Society of New Brunswick in Law Society v. Michael A.A. Ryan, a professional discipline case that found its way to the Supreme Court of Canada. In October 2003, Richard was appointed to the Court of Appeal of New Brunswick.

Richard was one of two finalists for an appointment to the Supreme Court of Canada in 2016, which went to Malcolm Rowe instead. He had previously been named a potential Supreme Count appointee by the National Post in 2008.

In 2016, Richard oversaw two bail applications of accused murderer Dennis Oland, denying the first as Oland was still appealing his conviction, but granting the second bail application after the Court of Appeal held that the trial had been flawed.

On May 4, 2018, he was appointed as the Chief Justice of New Brunswick by former Prime Minister Justin Trudeau. He succeeded J. Ernest Drapeau.

Richard serves on the Board of Directors for the Canadian Institute for the Administration of Justice.

Effective August 1, 2026, Richard has stepped down as chief justice. He will remain on the court as a supernumerary judge of the court. He will also become the Chief Judicial Officer of the National Judicial Institute.
