= John Murray Bliss =

Canadian lawyer (1771–1834)

Judge of the Supreme Court of New Brunswick
- In office 1816–1834

Personal details
- Born: 22 February 1771; Massachusetts
- Died: 22 August 1834
- Occupation: jurist

John Murray Bliss (22 February 1771 – 22 August 1834) was a Canadian jurist, politician and administrator.

== Biography ==
=== Father ===
John Murray Bliss was born in Massachusetts, the son of Massachusetts loyalist Daniel Bliss, a lawyer and British soldier who moved his family to New Brunswick in 1784 after being appointed to the first provincial council. Daniel Bliss also became chief justice of the court of common pleas. Daniel was a Harvard graduate (1760), and had left Concord, Massachusetts, and joined the British army when he was proscribed under the Massachusetts Banishment Act of 1778. In the army, he was appointed commissary.

=== Education and career ===
John Bliss studied law with Jonathan Sewall and Jonathan Bliss, became a lawyer in 1792, and started his practise in Fredericton, New Brunswick. He represented the county of York in the house of assembly. In 1816 he was elevated to the bench and to a seat in his majesty's council. On the decease in 1824 of Ward Chipman, who was acting as Governor of New Brunswick after the death of Governor George Stracey Smyth, Bliss assumed the administration of the government until the arrival of Governor Howard Douglas, a period of nearly a year. Bliss was a judge of the Supreme Court of New Brunswick, and was the senior justice at the time of his death.

John Murray Bliss is notable for his Loyalist beliefs and ties to this influential community. As a politician and colonial administrator he influenced the growth of New Brunswick.
