= Edward Winslow (scholar) =

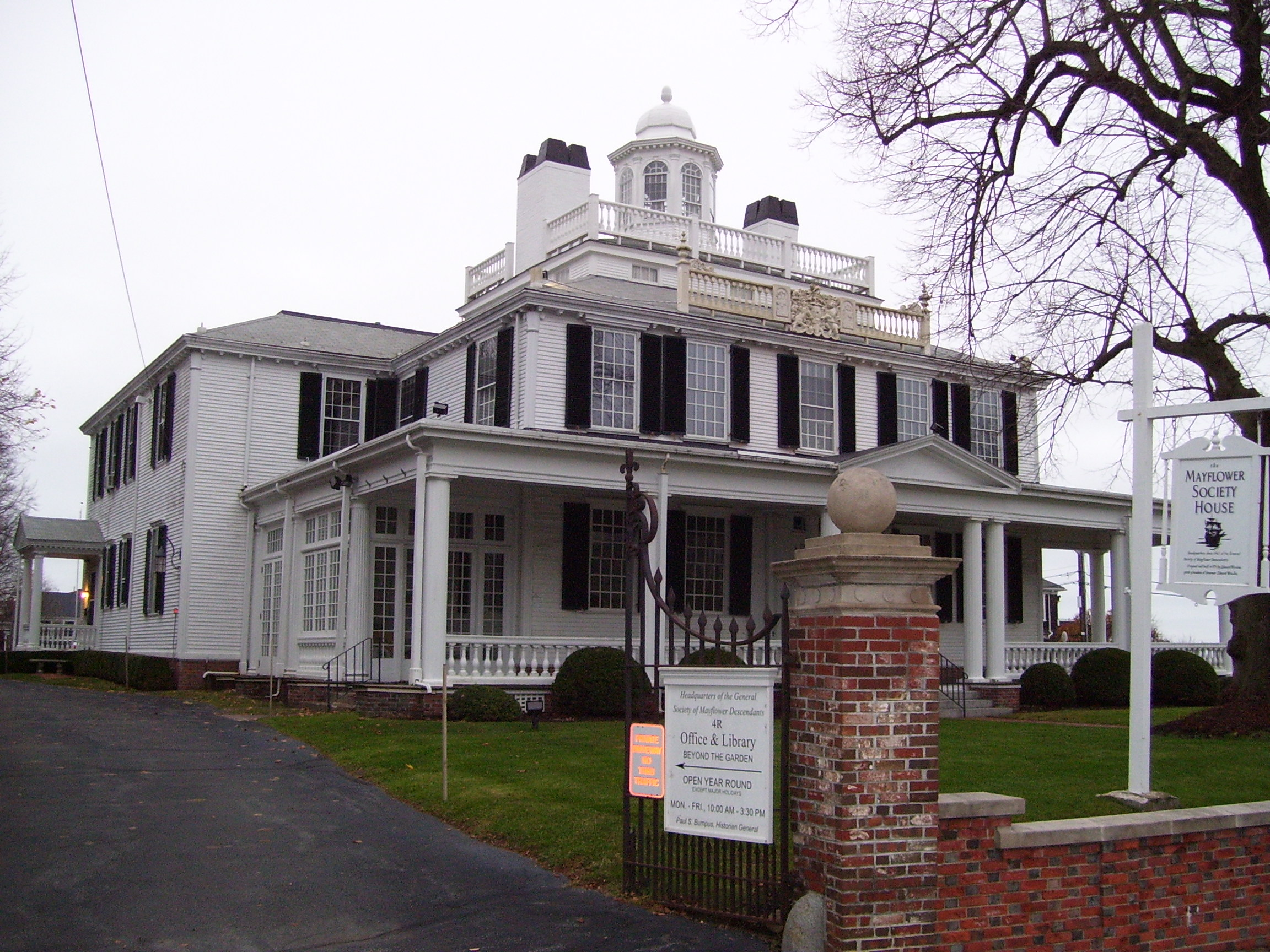
Edward Winslow's former home is now the Mayflower House Museum, Plymouth, Massachusetts (1754)

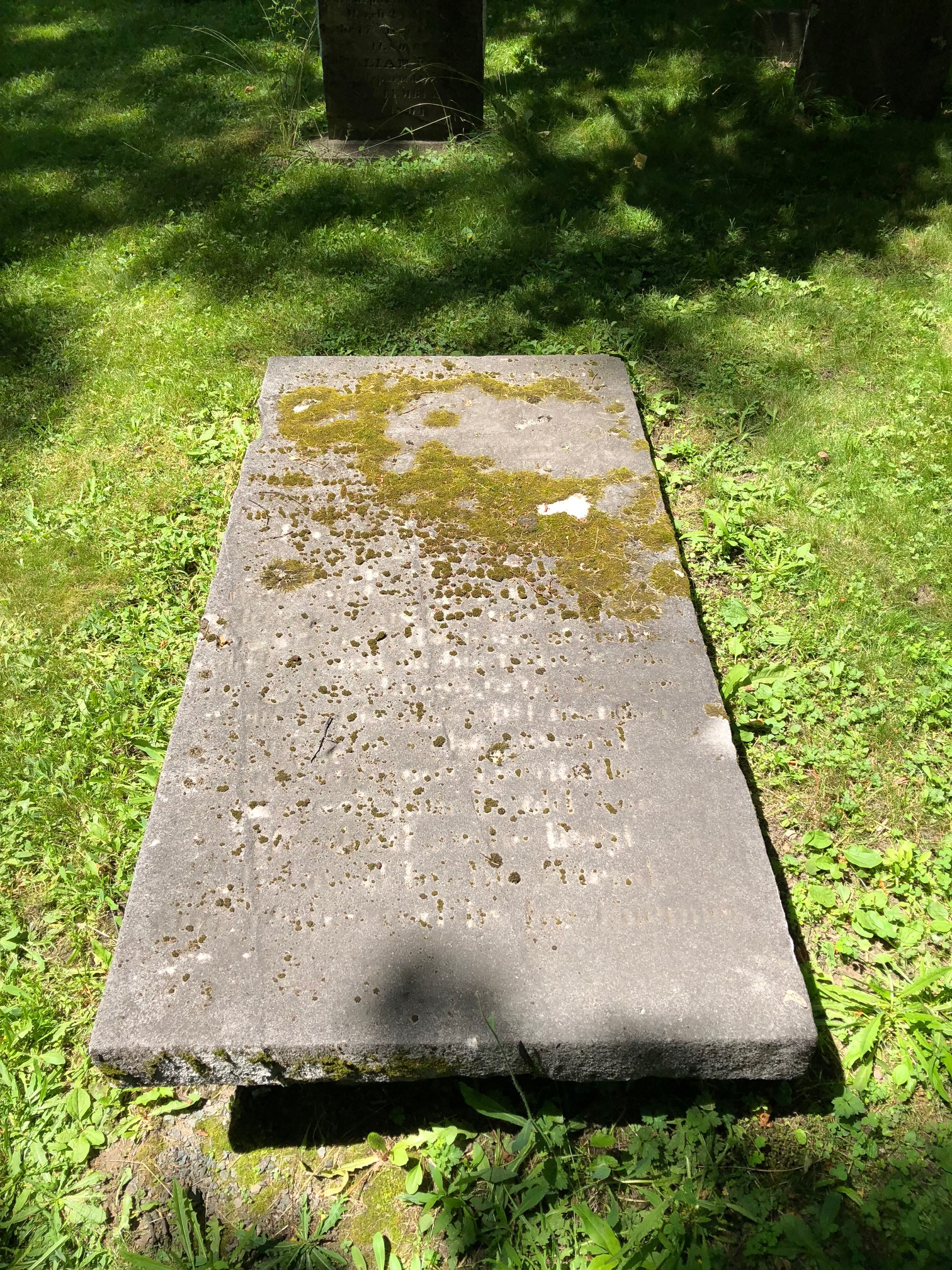
Edward Winslow, Old Burying Ground, Halifax, Nova Scotia

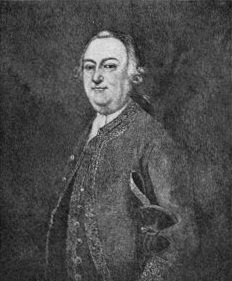
Edward's brother John Winslow

Edward Winslow (7 June 1714 – 8 June 1784) was a loyalist who was a government official in Boston until he moved to Halifax, Nova Scotia in 1776 during the American Revolution. He was the great grandson of Mayflower Pilgrim Edward Winslow. During Father Rale's War, Winslows older brother Josiah was given the command of Fort St. George (Thomaston, Maine) and was killed by natives of the Wabanaki Confederacy in the Northeast Coast Campaign (1724). He was also the father of loyalist Edward Winslow.

He was originally from Plymouth and became the Clerk of the Court, Register of Probate, and Collector of the Port. He built his home in 1754 in Plymouth, which is now preserved as a museum.

Winslow was buried with great honor. His pall-bearers included Sir John Wentworth, General Edmund Fanning, Lt. Governor John Parr, Hon. Arthur Goold, Brigadier-General John Small, Hon. Judge Foster Hutchinson and Henry Lloyd. He is buried in the Old Burying Ground (Halifax, Nova Scotia). His tombstone is inscribed in part "his fortune suffered shipwreck in the storm of civil war", the "civil war" being the American Revolution in which American Patriots were fighting American Loyalists.

== See also ==
- Nova Scotia in the American Revolution
