= John Agnew (New Brunswick politician) =

Canadian politician

John Agnew (c. 1727–1812) was a minister and political figure in New Brunswick. He represented Sunbury in the Legislative Assembly of New Brunswick from 1793 to 1795.

He was rector of the Established Church in Suffolk, Virginia. Agnew later served as chaplain for the Queen's Rangers during the American Revolution. He was taken prisoner with Stair Agnew, his son, and others and taken to France. He later settled in New Brunswick. Agnew died near Fredericton at the age of 85.
