= Harrison Gray (Treasurer) =

American politician and merchant

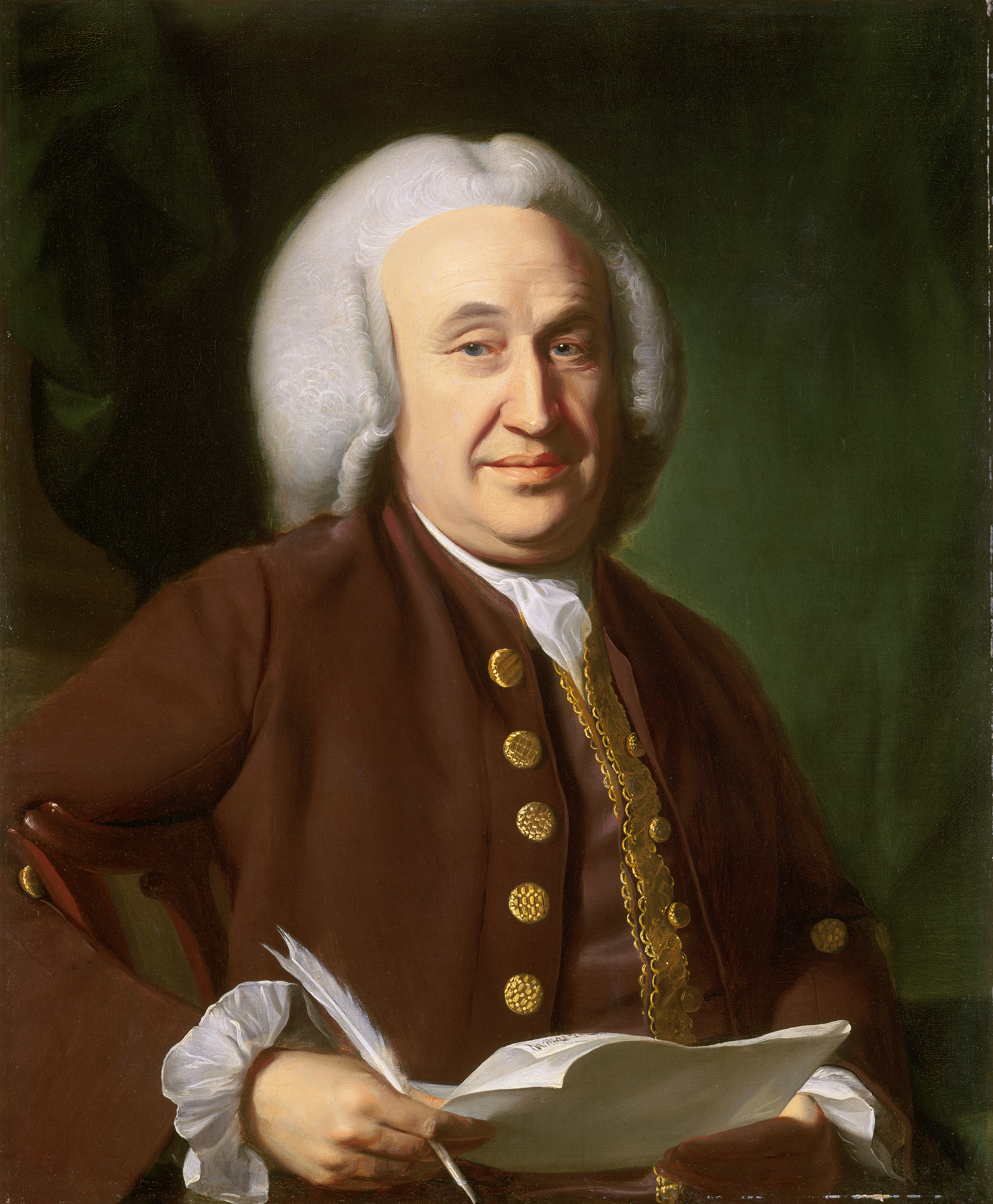
- Harrison Gray, Treasurer of Massachusetts Bay

Personal details
- Born: 1711 Boston, Massachusetts
- Died: 1794 (aged 82–83) London, England
- Children: Elizabeth Gray Otis
- Occupation: Merchant

Military service
- Allegiance: Province of Massachusetts Bay, United Kingdom

Harrison Gray (1711–1794) was a wealthy merchant, as well as Treasurer and Receiver-General for the Province of Massachusetts Bay, a position that he held from 1753 until the beginning of the Revolution. Although more of a political moderate, in 1774, Gray was forced to choose between patriotism and loyalism over the Massachusetts Government Act (which suspended the Provincial Charter). Gray chose to recognize the right of the King and Parliament to suspend, at will, the rights and liberties of Massachusetts Bay.

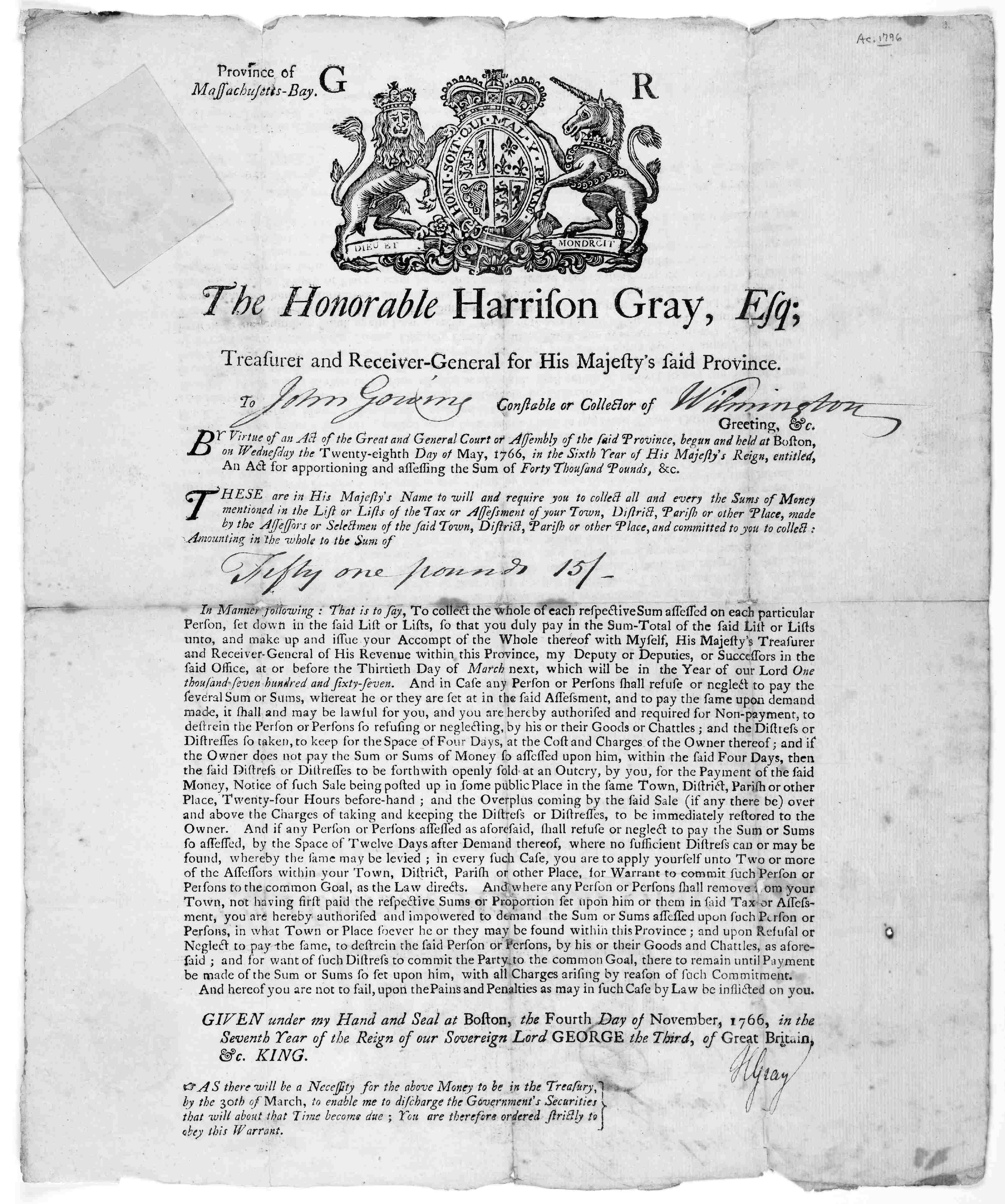
Tax warrant issued by Harrison Gray, Esq., November 1766

In 1775, Gray published his loyalist views in a pamphlet titled The Two Congresses Cut Up. Ultimately, Gray's property was confiscated and he was forced to flee Boston in 1776 where he spent the rest of his life in London, England. He was named in the Massachusetts Banishment Act of 1778. Harrison's daughter, Elizabeth Gray Otis, stayed behind with her husband Samuel Allyne Otis [1740–1814], brother of pamphleteer James Otis, Jr. and author Mercy Otis Warren.

Harrison Gray's grandson, Harrison Gray Otis was later able to recuperate some of Gray's property that had been confiscated during the revolution, although Gray himself was deceased by this time.
