= Jonathan Bliss =

Canadian politician

Jonathan Bliss (October 1, 1742 – October 1, 1822) was a lawyer, judge and political figure in New Brunswick. He represented St. John County in the Legislative Assembly of New Brunswick from 1786 to 1792 and from 1796 to 1802.

He was born in Springfield, Massachusetts, the son of Luke Bliss and Mercy Ely. Bliss was educated at Harvard College, studied law in Boston and set up practice in Wilbraham. He was named a justice of the peace in 1770 and a major in the militia in the following year. He travelled to England near the start of the American Revolution, and was subsequently named in the Massachusetts Banishment Act of 1778. In 1784, he accepted the post of attorney general for the province of New Brunswick. With Ward Chipman, he was elected to the 1st New Brunswick Legislative Assembly after the sheriff closed the polls early and disallowed votes for opposing candidates.

== Personal life and death ==
In 1790, Bliss married Mary Worthington. He purchased a large home in Saint John formerly owned by Benedict Arnold. He was named Chief Justice of New Brunswick in 1809 and was appointed to the Executive Council of New Brunswick that same year. He remained a judge until his death in Fredericton in 1822 because the government was not prepared to grant him a pension. He is buried at the Loyalist Burial Ground in Saint John.

His son William Blowers served in the Nova Scotia assembly and was a puisne judge for the Supreme Court of Nova Scotia.

Legal offices
Preceded by George D. Ludlow	Chief Justice of New Brunswick; 1809–1822	Succeeded by John Saunders
