= Court of Appeal of New Brunswick =

Appellate court in New Brunswick, Canada

The Court of Appeal of New Brunswick (French: Cour d'appel du Nouveau-Brunswick) (frequently referred to as New Brunswick Court of Appeal or NBCA) is the appellate court in the province of New Brunswick. There are five Justices, one Chief Justice, any former judge of the Court of Appeal who is a supernumerary judge and any former Chief Justice of New Brunswick who is a judge or a supernumerary judge. The court sits in Fredericton, New Brunswick. Cases are heard by a panel of three judges.

As of 2018, the Chief Justice is the Honourable J.C. Marc Richard.

== Jurisdiction ==
The court hears appeals from the Court of King's Bench of New Brunswick, Provincial Court of New Brunswick, and various tribunals. Cases tried by the court can be appealed to the Supreme Court of Canada, but in practice this happens only a few times a year.

== Current judges ==
Position / Name	Appointed	Nominated by	Position Prior to Appointment
Chief Justice J.C. Marc Richard	2018 (as Chief); 2003 (Justice)	Trudeau (Chief); Chretien (Justice)	Lawyer at Barry Spalding Richard
Justice Kathleen Quigg	2008	Harper	Court of Queen's Bench of New Brunswick
Justice Bradley Green	2009	Harper	Court of Queen's Bench of New Brunswick (2008 to 2009) counsel with Legislative Assembly of New Brunswick (2006 to 2009); Minister of Justice (1999 to 2006); Minister of Health and Aboriginal Affairs (1999 to 2006)
Justice Lucie Lavigne	2018	Trudeau	Court of Queen's Bench of New Brunswick
Justice Denise LeBlanc	2022	Trudeau	Court of Queen's Bench of New Brunswick
Justice Ivan Robichaud	2024	Trudeau	Court of King's Bench of New Brunswick
Justice Robert Dysart	2025	Carney	Court of King's Bench of New Brunswick

Supernumerary

Position / Name	Appointed	Nominated by	Position Prior to Appointment
Justice Ernest Drapeau	1998	Chrétien	Court of Appeal of New Brunswick Lawyer at Drapeau, Robichaud & McNally
Justice Barbara L. Baird	2014	Harper	Court of Queen's Bench of New Brunswick
Justice Raymond T. French	2015	Harper	Court of Queen's Bench of New Brunswick
