= Thomas Wetmore =

Canadian politician

Thomas Wetmore (September 20, 1767 – March 22, 1828) was a lawyer and political figure in New Brunswick.

He was born in Rye, New York, the son of Timothy Wetmore and Jane Haviland. He came to New Brunswick after the American Revolution in 1783, first settling at Carleton (later Saint John) and then Gagetown. Wetmore studied law with Ward Chipman and was admitted to the bar in 1790. He was named clerk for the Inferior Court of Common Pleas and registrar of deeds for Carleton County. In 1793, he married Sarah Peters. He served as lieutenant-colonel in the militia. In 1809, Wetmore was elected to the Legislative Assembly of New Brunswick for St. John County; he did not run for reelection in 1816. In the same year, he was named Attorney General for the colony and served in the post until his death on his estate near Fredericton at the age of 60. Wetmore was named to the colony's ruling Council in 1817. He also served as justice of the peace for York County.

His son George Ludlow Wetmore predeceased his father, dying in a duel in 1821.
