= Joseph Bettys =

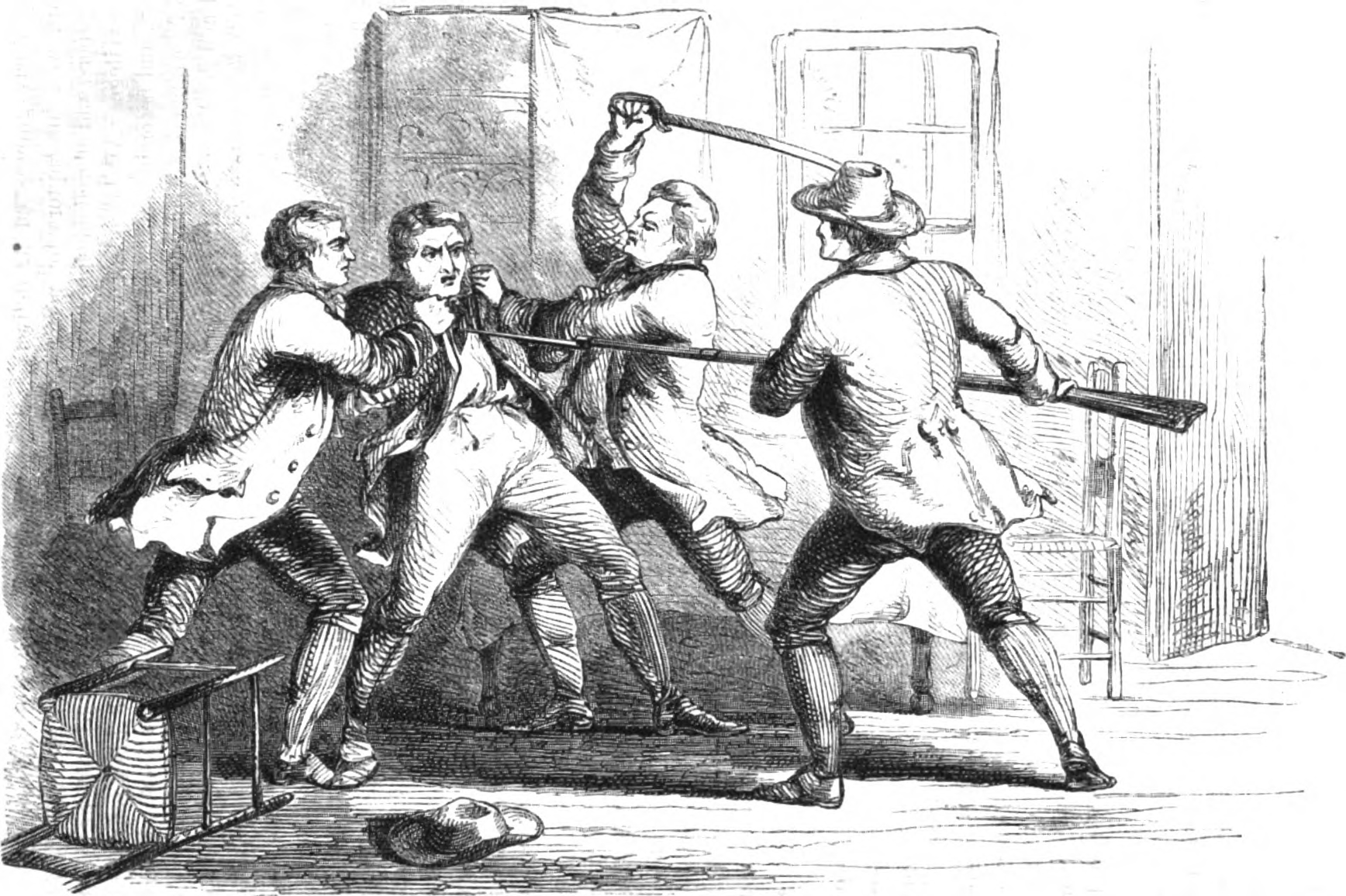
"The Capture of Joe Bettys"

Joseph Bettys (c. 1754–April 1, 1782) was a soldier in the American Revolution best known for being hanged as a British Spy in 1782.

Bettys was born and grew up in Wilton in Fairfield County, Connecticut.

In 1772 he moved with his family to the Town of Ballston, New York. Bettys joined the Patriot forces and was made a sergeant. He was said to be courageous, but intolerant of military discipline, for which he was demoted. In the summer of 1776 he was again promoted, and transferred to the fleet on Lake Champlain commanded by Benedict Arnold.

On October 11, 1776 he distinguished himself in the Battle of Valcour Island, but was captured by the British and taken as a prisoner to Canada. In 1777, during his captivity, he changed sides, joining the British forces as an ensign.

He served as a spy and messenger for the British; at one point he was captured, but was freed due to influence of family and friends. He rejoined British service and began recruiting soldiers among the population of Saratoga County, raiding, burning farms and taking captives or killing Patriots. It is reported that at one time he entered the city of Albany and attempted, without success, to capture General Philip Schuyler (or alternatively Robert Van Rensselaer).

In 1782, on one of his covert visits to Saratoga County, Bettys was observed and tracked through the snow to the home of a well-known loyalist. He was surprised while eating, and overcome by four men—Jacob Fulmer, John Cory, James Cory, and Francis Perkins—and taken prisoner. He was given permission to smoke, but while getting his tobacco was observed to throw an object into the fire. This was retrieved and turned out to be a small lead box containing a paper with a message in cipher. Bettys offered 100 guineas to be allowed to burn the message, and also offered money for his release, but his offers were refused. He was set to Albany, where he was tried and executed that year.
