= George Duncan Ludlow =

Lawyer and judge (1734–1808)

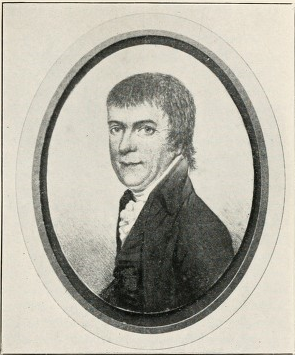

1st Chief Justice of New Brunswick
- In office 1784–1808
- Preceded by: Inaugural holder
- Succeeded by: Jonathan Bliss

Personal details
- Born: 29 September 1734 Queens County, Long Island, Province of New York
- Died: 13 November 1808 (aged 74) Fredericton, Colony of New Brunswick
- Spouse: Frances Duncan (m. 1758)
- Relations: Gabriel George Ludlow (brother); Daniel Ludlow (half-brother)
- Children: 3
- Parent(s): Gabriel Ludlow; Frances Duncan Ludlow

George Duncan Ludlow (29 September 1734 – 13 November 1808) was a lawyer and Puisne Judge of the Supreme Court of the British Province of New York in the Thirteen Colonies who became the first Chief Justice of New Brunswick in Canada.

== Early life ==
Ludlow was born on 29 September 1734 in Queens County on Long Island in the Province of New York in what was then British America. He was the son of Gabriel Ludlow (1704–1773), a merchant, and Frances (née Duncan) Ludlow. Among his siblings was his younger brother Gabriel George Ludlow. After his mother's death, his father married Elizabeth Crommelin, with whom he had Daniel Ludlow, George's younger half-brother. His sister, Elizabeth Ludlow, was the wife of Francis Lewis Jr. (brother of Gov. Morgan Lewis).

The first Ludlow in America was his grandfather, also named Gabriel Ludlow (1663–1736), who was born at Castle Cary and left Frome around 1694 to settle in New Amsterdam, and became a prominent and influential merchant, shipowner, landholder and longtime clerk of the New York General Assembly. He obtained a patent from King George II for a tract of 4,000 acres of land in what became Orange County, New York on the west bank of the Hudson River. His grandfather's grandfather, Thomas Ludlow, was the brother of both Gabriel Ludlow, Receiver of the Duchy of Lancaster during the reign of King Charles I, and Roger Ludlow, Deputy Governor of the Massachusetts Bay Colony.

The wealth and status of the Ludlow family gave George and his brothers "several advantages, including education in a private school." He spent a short period as an apprentice apothecary before turning to the law.

== Career ==
After studying law, Ludlow was admitted to the bar, and rose quickly within the profession. He focused his practice on commercial cases and was often employed either as an arbitrator or an adjustor. Ludlow was able to amass a fortune quickly and retire early to a large estate on his native Long Island.

Shortly after his retirement, however, he was appointed judge of the Court of Common Pleas, and on December 14, 1769, he was commissioned as a judge of the Supreme Court of Judicature and served as Master of the Rolls. After Ludlow was passed over for the office of Chief Justice of the Province of New York in 1780, in favor of William Smith, he resigned from the bench. As a consolation, Governor James Robertson appointed him Chief Superintendent of the police for Long Island in 1780.

During the American Revolution, he remained loyal to the Crown. At the close of the war, his property, including his 140-acre estate in Hyde Park, passed to the State under the Confiscation Act of 1779, and in 1781, he abandoned his estate at Hempstead Plains to return to England, leaving his family behind until he could arrange their settlement elsewhere. He later "estimated the price of his loyalty at £6,500 in real and personal estate."

Along with his brother Gabriel, he settled in the newly created Province of New Brunswick in Canada where the British Government gave them large tracts of land for the losses they sustained in New York. In 1784, he was named the Chief Justice of the Supreme Court of the Province of New Brunswick. James Putnam, Isaac Allen, and Joshua Upham were appointed as assistant judges. His brother Gabriel was named the first mayor of the important port city of Saint John, New Brunswick. As chief justice he was a member of the original council that was to administer the province and he "participated in all decisions regarding legislation and justice" throughout Thomas Carleton's governorship. Ludlow and his brother held these positions for the next 25 years until his death in 1808.

=== Controversial views ===
Ludlow, a slaveholder himself, upheld slavery in New Brunswick in a controversial court case in February 1800, R v Jones. George Ludlow found that slavery was lawful based on customs in North America despite there being no British statute legalizing it. However, by 1820 slavery ended in New Brunswick, partly due to the controversy arising from the 1800 decision.

George Duncan Ludlow also served on a local board of commissioners for the Sussex Vale Indian Residential School where he advocated for the total removal of Indigenous children from their parents.

== Personal life ==
On 22 April 1758, Ludlow married his cousin, Frances Duncan, a daughter of Thomas Duncan and Mary (née Ketcham) Duncan. In 1764, the Duncan home, a 3-story house on Pearl Street (then known as Queen Street), caught fire and burned to the ground, killing her mother and seven siblings in the nursery on the third floor. Only Frances, her father and her younger sister Arabella escaped. Arabella later married George's younger half-brother, Daniel Ludlow. Together, Frances and George were the parents of one son and two daughters, including:

- Frances Duncan Ludlow (1766–1797) was the second wife of Richard Harison, a law partner of Alexander Hamilton who served as the Recorder of New York City and the 1st U.S. Attorney for the District of New York.
- Elizabeth Ludlow (1768–1826), who married John Robinson, a Lt. in the Royal American Regiment who was a son of Col. Beverley Robinson and Susanna Philipse.
- George Duncan Ludlow (1773–1847), who married Mrs. Carson, who was born in the Nevis, West Indies, in 1825. After her death, he married Camille Bernier in Paris, France.

Ludlow acquired about 1,500 acres about five miles north of the new province's capital of Fredericton where he built a large home on the Saint John River, which he called Spring Hill after the estate of Lieutenant Governor Cadwallader Colden, his New York patron of the 1760s. In February 1808, his brother Gabriel died and he suffered a paralytic stroke the following month that rendered him largely incapacitated until his death at Spring Hill on November 13, 1808. He was buried at the Old Burial Ground in Fredericton.

=== Legacy ===
The village of Ludlow in Northumberland County is named in his honour.

In 2019, a portrait of Ludlow was removed from Ludlow Hall, which houses the Faculty of Law, on the campus of the University of New Brunswick. On 26 May 2020, his name was removed from the Hall amid disputes about his controversial political stances.
