= Samuel Denny Street =

Canadian politician

Samuel Denny Street (May 16, 1752 – December 11, 1830) was an English-born lawyer and political figure in New Brunswick. He represented Sunbury County in the Legislative Assembly of New Brunswick from 1795 to 1802 and from 1809 to 1816.

== Career ==
=== Youth and military service ===
He was born in Southwark, the son of Thomas Street and Ann Lee. Street apprenticed with a London attorney and practiced law for a time before joining the Royal Navy. During his time in the navy he served under Lieutenant-General Thomas Gage at Boston. After his discharge from the navy he went to Halifax, Nova Scotia in 1776, joined the Royal Fencible Americans, and was sent to Fort Cumberland (near Sackville, New Brunswick) later that year with his regiment. While stationed at Fort Cumberland in 1778, he married Abigail Freeman. Street took part in a number of missions to Maine during the American Revolutionary War. In 1781, he was captured. He was put on a prison ship but later escaped. After his escape the rest of the war was quiet for him and eventually he was retired on half pay.

=== Postwar life ===
He settled near Burton. In 1785, he was admitted to the practice of law in the new province of New Brunswick. Street ran unsuccessfully for a seat in the provincial assembly in 1792. In 1800, he challenged John Murray Bliss to a duel after Bliss accused him of lying in court. In 1802, he was named clerk for the legislative assembly. In 1819, he was named to the province's Legislative Council. He died in Fredericton at the age of 68.

== Family ==
His son George Frederick served in the province's Supreme Court. His sons John Ambrose and William Henry served in the province's assembly. His daughter Ann was the grandmother of poet Bliss Carman.
