= Jonathan Sewall =

American lawyer

Jonathan Sewall, Jr.

Attorney General of the Province of Massachusetts Bay
- In office November 1767 – 1775

Personal details
- Born: August 24, 1729 Boston, Massachusetts
- Died: September 27, 1796 (aged 67) Saint John, New Brunswick
- Spouse: Esther Quincy
- Children: Jonathan Sewell, Chief-Justice of Lower Canada. Stephen Sewell, Solicitor General of Lower Canada
- Profession: Attorney

Jonathan Sewall (August 24, 1729 – September 27, 1796) was the last Colonial attorney general of Massachusetts.

He was born in Boston on August 24, 1729, to Jonathan Sewall Sr. and Mary (Payne) Sewall. Sewall's father was an unsuccessful merchant who died at a young age. However through scholarships, funds raised by his pastor William Cooper and with the help of his uncle, Chief Justice Stephen Sewall, Sewall was able to attend Harvard. Sewall graduated from Harvard College in 1748, and was a teacher in Salem until 1756. He married Esther Quincy, a daughter of merchant Edmund Quincy. After studying law, he began a successful practice in Charlestown and served as attorney general of Massachusetts from 1767 to 1775. In 1768, he was also appointed Judge of Admiralty for Nova Scotia.

In 1759, Sewall became a very close friend and patron of John Adams, the future second President of the United States. At the urging of Governor Francis Bernard, Sewall offered Adams the position of Advocate General in the Admiralty Court, to which Adams declined. A devout Loyalist, Sewall took his family to England in 1775 after a mob stormed his family home in Cambridge (he was subsequently named in the Massachusetts Banishment Act of 1778). While in England, he changed the spelling of the family name to Sewell. Adams, in his diary, grieved that his best friend in the world had become his implacable enemy. While Adams was assigned to London as a US minister to the Court of St James's in 1785, he looked up his old friend and they had a two-hour meeting. Both men were entrenched in their own ideas and no reconciliation was possible; Adams considered Sewall a casualty of the war.

Sewall later served as a judge in the vice admiralty court of Nova Scotia. He died in Saint John, New Brunswick, in 1796.

His son Jonathan later served as Chief Justice of Lower Canada and his son Stephen served as solicitor general for Lower Canada.

== In popular culture ==
Sewall was portrayed by James Noble in the PBS miniseries The Adams Chronicles (1976), and by Guy Henry in the HBO miniseries John Adams (2008).

== Bibliography ==
- Jonathan Sewall: Odyssey of an American Loyalist, Carol Berkin. Columbia University Press (1974) ISBN 0-595-00020-7

Legal offices
Preceded by Vacant after Jeremiah Gridley	Attorney General of Massachusetts; 1767–1774	Succeeded by Vacant until Benjamin Kent
