= John Saunders (New Brunswick judge) =

The Hon. John Saunders (D.C.L.) (June 1, 1754 – May 24, 1834) was a British soldier, lawyer, and Chief Justice of the colonial Province of New Brunswick.

Born to landed gentry in Princess Anne County, Virginia, Thirteen Colonies, North America, during the American Revolutionary War he remained loyal to Britain. In 1764 in Princess Anne County, Virginia, USA (present day Virginia Beach), John Saunders built Pembroke Manor. The Manor still stands today and is in private use. In Fall 1775 Saunders, under the direction of Colonel Jacob Ellegood and Royal Governor Dunmore, joined the Queen's Own Loyal Virginia Regiment. The QOLVR was to aid in the number of Crown Forces assembling in Tidewater Virginia to help thwart the tide of Rebels from Virginia and North Carolina. In December 1775 (present day Chesapeake, Virginia) the Battle of Great Bridge resulted in a defeat for Crown Forces, but it was not until the Summer of 1776 that the Crown Forces including members of the QOLVR moved North and were assimilated into the Queen's Rangers. At the outbreak of the war, Saunders raised a troop of Dragoons at his own expense. Merged into the Queen's Rangers, he rose to the rank of Captain and served under John Graves Simcoe. In 1782, Saunders went to England to study law and entered the Middle Temple. In 1787, he was called to the English Bar and in 1790 was appointed a Judge of the Supreme Court of New Brunswick.

Making his home in Fredericton (in present day New Brunswick, Canada), in 1790 he married Arianna Chalmers (1768–1845), the daughter of the wealthy Loyalist, Lt. Col. James Chalmers (1727–1806). Like other soldiers of the Queen's Rangers, Saunders was entitled to Crown grants of land in the Queensbury / Southampton, New Brunswick area, a then unsettled forestry about 50 miles (80 km) west of Fredericton on the Saint John River. While enlisted men received land parcels with restrictive covenants of between 100 acres (0.40 km^{2}) to 200 acres (0.81 km^{2}), Saunders, as part of the elite and Surveyor General of the Province, was given more than 6,000 acres (24 km^{2}) without any restrictions. At Pokiok, he built an estate known as the Barony, a symbol of his aristocratic status.

John Saunders was appointed to the Legislative Assembly of New Brunswick and on May 3, 1793 was appointed the province's first Provincial Treasurer and Surveyor General. In 1822, Saunders was elevated to Chief Justice of New Brunswick, a position he held for the rest of his life.

John Saunders died in 1834 at Fredericton and was buried in the city's Old Burying Grounds.

Legal offices
| Preceded by Jonathan Bliss | Chief Justice of New Brunswick; 1822–1834 | Succeeded by Ward Chipman |
