= Charles Jeffery Peters =

Canadian politician

Charles Peters
- Born: October 8, 1773
- Died: February 3, 1848 (aged 74)
- Occupations: Lawyer; judge; politician

Charles Jeffery Peters (October 8, 1773 – February 3, 1848) was a lawyer, judge and politician in New Brunswick.

He was born in Hempstead, New York, the son of James Peters, a United Empire Loyalist, and Margaret Lester. Peters came to Nova Scotia with his father in 1783. He studied law with Ward Chipman and was admitted to practice as an attorney in New Brunswick in 1794. He practiced law for a brief time in Kingston before returning to Saint John. In 1797, he married Elizabeth Baker. In 1799, Peters became common clerk of the city. Later that year, he was named deputy surrogate and probate judge for St. John County. In 1809, Peters was named judge in the vice admiralty court. He was named King's Counsel in 1823. Peters married Marianne Elizabeth Forbes that same year, after the death of his first wife. In 1825, he was named solicitor general and, in 1828, Peters became attorney general. In 1846, he was named to the province's Executive Council. Peters died near Fredericton at the age of 74.

His brother Benjamin Lester was a merchant, militia officer and police magistrate for the city of Saint John.
