= Edward Winslow (loyalist) =

Edward Winslow (February 20, 1746 or 1747 – May 13, 1815) was a loyalist officer and New Brunswick judge and official.

Edward Winslow was born in Plymouth, Massachusetts in 1746 or 1747, a descendant of Mayflower Pilgrim Edward Winslow and the son of Edward Winslow (scholar). He studied at Harvard College, graduating in 1765 with an MA. After graduation, as the political tension escalated between Great Britain and its North American colonies over issues such as trade, taxation, and governance, Winslow publicly put his support behind Massachusetts Governor Thomas Hutchinson and helped create "a company of Tories" in an effort to keep the peace. By 1774, Winslow was forced to flee Plymouth, and in April 1775, as a member of the British Army, he was involved in a bloody confrontation at Lexington against the Patriot militia. In March 1776, he retreated along with the British troops to Halifax, and by July had been appointed muster master general for the Loyalist forces. (He was subsequently named in the Massachusetts Banishment Act of 1778.)

After the Patriots' victory was secured in 1783, Winslow and his fellow Loyalists were essentially reduced to the status of refugees. He moved his family to Granville in Annapolis County, Nova Scotia, but spent most of his time in Halifax making plans for the settling of Loyalists throughout Nova Scotia. Frustrated with the efforts of the Nova Scotia authorities at settling the approximately 35,000 Loyalists, Winslow began to advocate for the creation of a separate colony in the area north of the Bay of Fundy. In 1783 he was named secretary to Brigadier-General Henry Edward Fox, who was sympathetic to Winslow's proposal. The British government approved the creation of a new colony, called New Brunswick, in June 1784.

Winslow and his family spent a few months in Saint John, New Brunswick, in 1785, before moving to Fredericton. In 1787 Winslow's mother and sisters (his father Edward Sr. died in 1784 and was buried in the Old Burying Ground (Halifax, Nova Scotia)) joined them. Before his appointment to the New Brunswick Supreme Court in 1807, Winslow served in a number of government posts: surrogate general, judge of the inferior court of common pleas, muster master of the King's New Brunswick regiment, secretary to the International Boundary Commission, and deputy surveyor of the King's Woods. Despite the relative financial ease that his position with the New Brunswick Supreme Court offered him, Winslow's family endured financial hardships up until the time of his death. He died in 1815 in Kingsclear, New Brunswick.

== Family ==
It was during the war that Winslow met his future wife Mary Symonds, and by 1783 they had three children: Daniel Murray (1777-1814), Chipman (1778-1783) and Mary (1779-1843). Nine children followed: Penelope (1783-1836), John Francis Wentworth (1783-1859), Thomas Aston Coffin (1784-1810), Edward (1785?-1820), Hannah (b.1788?), Sarah Ann (1790-?), Christianna (1791-1814), Eliza Chipman (1794-1854), and Catherine (1799-1805).
