= Ward Chipman =

Canadian politician

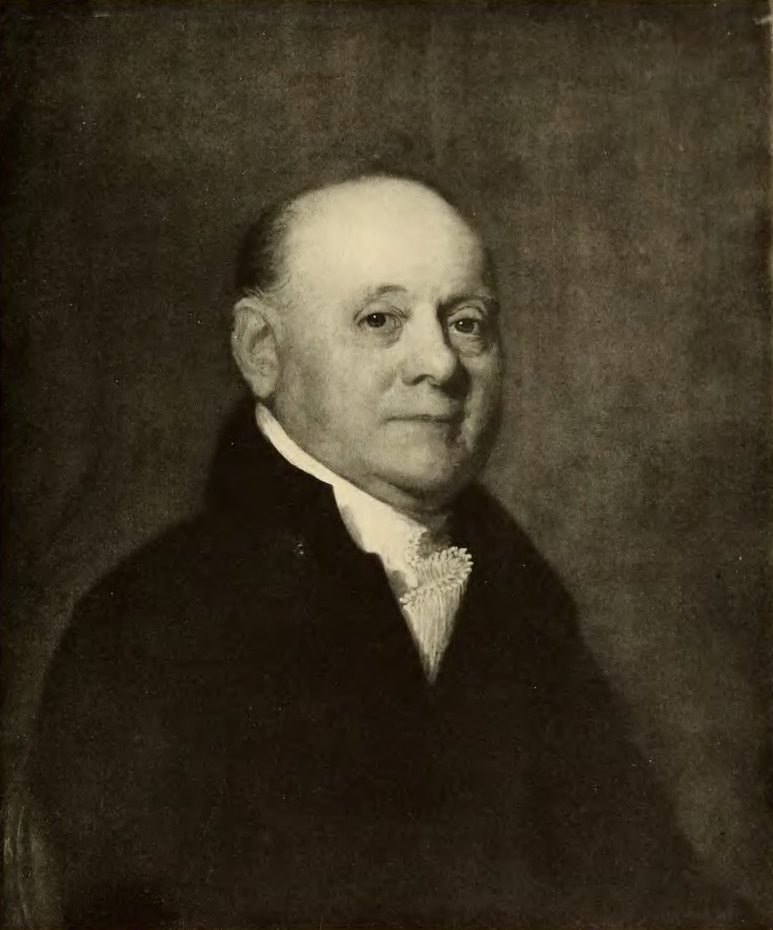
- portrait by Gilbert Stuart
- Born: July 30, 1754; Marblehead, Massachusetts
- Died: February 9, 1824 (aged 69); Fredericton
- Occupations: Lawyer, Judge, Politician
- Known for: Law, Politics

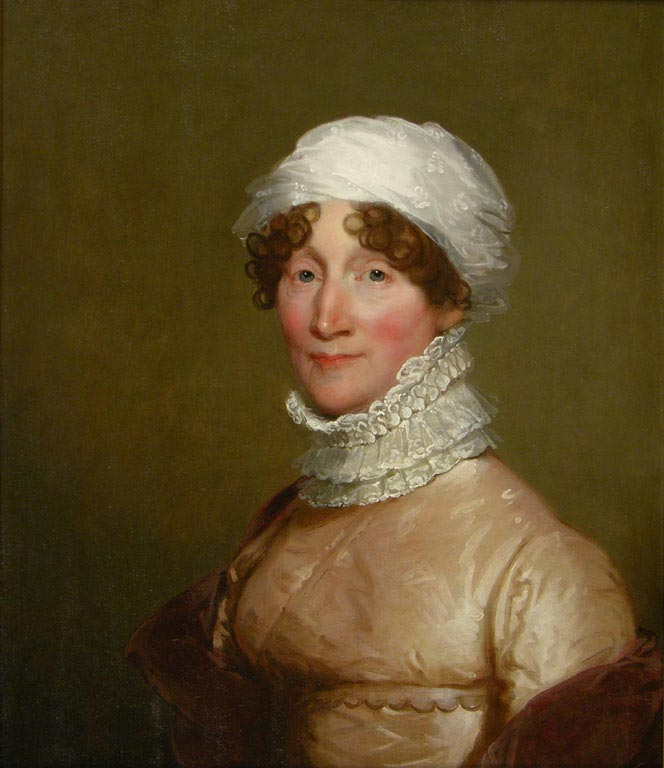
A portrait of Elizabeth Hazen, who Chipman married in 1786; painted by Gilbert Stuart.

Ward Chipman (July 30, 1754 – February 9, 1824) was a New Brunswick lawyer, judge, and political figure. He briefly served as administrator for New Brunswick from 1823 until his death in 1824.

== Early life ==
He was born in Marblehead, Massachusetts in 1754 and studied at Harvard College. He taught school in Boston, then articled in law with Jonathan Sewall. He practiced law in the Vice-Admiralty Court and also was a clerk-solicitor in the Boston customhouse. However, he remained loyal to Britain during the American Revolution and withdrew to Halifax and then London. In 1777, he became deputy to muster master general Edward Winslow; at the same time, he was admitted to the bar in New York and resided for a time in Staten Island.

== Career ==
At the end of the war, he returned to London and lobbied for a grant of land in Nova Scotia. He became part of a group of loyalists urging that Nova Scotia be partitioned, which led to the creation of New Brunswick. Chipman was named solicitor general for the new province. He prepared a charter for the city of Saint John for Governor Thomas Carleton and served as recorder for the city from 1785 to 1809, which also made him a justice of the peace. In 1785, he was one of the founders of the New Brunswick bar and set up practice in Saint John. Chipman's clients included Benedict Arnold. Also in 1785, he ran as a pro-government candidate for the Legislative Assembly and was elected, although he is said to have the support of the local sheriff in the inspection of the ballots; he was defeated in the 1793 election for the 2nd New Brunswick Legislature, but returned in Northumberland County. He was defeated again in 1795.

In 1800, he pleaded the case of Nancy Morton, an enslaved Black woman, in R v Jones; the court was divided with respect to Chipman's assertion that slavery was illegal in New Brunswick, so no decision was made and the woman was returned to her master. Chipman also supported the settlement of several hundred Black refugees in the province following the War of 1812.

He was also a gentleman farmer and was known for the quality of his potato crops.

Chipman represented the British in the negotiations held to establish the province's boundary with the state of Maine. In 1806, he was named to the Council. He was named a puisne judge in the province's Supreme Court in 1808. In 1815, he was named to a second commission charged with settling the boundary with Maine as it applied to islands in Passamaquoddy Bay. In 1823, Chipman was named colonial administrator after the death of Lieutenant Governor George Stracey Smyth; he died in office at Fredericton in 1824.

== Legacy ==
The Ward Chipman Library at the University of New Brunswick was named in his honour.

Legal offices
Preceded by John Saunders	Chief Justice of New Brunswick; 1834–1851	Succeeded by James Carter
