= Court of King's Bench of New Brunswick =

Canadian trial court

- Location: Bathurst; Campbellton; Edmundston; Fredericton; Miramichi; Moncton; Saint John; and Woodstock
- Number of positions: 30
- Website: Court of King's Bench of New Brunswick

Chief Justice
- Currently: Hon. Tracey K. DeWare
- Since: 2019

The Court of King's Bench of New Brunswick (in French: Cour du Banc du Roi du Nouveau-Brunswick, when the monarch is female Queen's Bench and de la Reine) is the superior trial court of the Canadian province of New Brunswick.

In 1979, the Supreme Court of the Province of New Brunswick was dissolved, and its trial functions went to the Court of King's Bench, while its appeal functions largely shifted to the Court of Appeal of New Brunswick.

== Structure ==
The Court of King's Bench of New Brunswick consists of a Chief Justice among 17 judicial seats, plus a number of justices who have elected supernumerary status after many years of service and after having attained eligibility for retirement. This tally does not include the 8 judicial seats assigned for the family court.

== Former justices (including district) ==
Name	County	Appointment	Nominated By	Prior Position(s)
Justice George S. Rideout	Moncton	1997	Chretien	Member of Parliament (Liberal)
Justice Roger Savoie	Moncton			
Justice Jacques A. Sirois	Moncton			
Justice Guy W. Boisvert	Bathurst			
Justice David H. Russell	Fredericton			
Justice Thomas W. Riordon	Miramichi			
Justice Roger McIntyre	Bathurst			
Justice Barbara L. Baird	Fredericton	2007		private practice Member of Legislative Assembly NB
Justice Robert J. Higgins	Saint John			
Justice Joseph Albert Pichette (1963-1975)	Edmundston			
Justice Robert L. Tuck	Moncton			
