= New Brunswick Route 655 =

Highway in New Brunswick, Canada

Coordinates: 45.823895°N 66.596031°W

Route 655

Route information
- Maintained by New Brunswick Department of Transportation
- Length: 15 km (9.3 mi)

Major junctions
- East end: Route 101 in Nasonworth
- West end: Route 102 in Oromocto

Location
- Country: Canada
- Province: New Brunswick

Highway system
- Provincial highways in New Brunswick; Former routes
← Route 645	→ Route 670

Route 655 is a 15.3-kilometre (9.5 mi) long mostly east–west secondary highway in the southwestern portion of New Brunswick, Canada. Most of the route is in New Maryland Parish.

The route starts at Route 101 in Nasonworth where it crosses the Oromocto River and travels southeast through Rusagonis-Waasis. The route continues to cross Route 2 and Route 7 while running along the east bank of the Oromocto River. Route 655 ends between Oromocto and Lincoln at Route 102 close to the Fredericton International Airport.
