= Blissville Parish =

Coordinates: 45.633°N 66.583°W

Blissville
- Parish
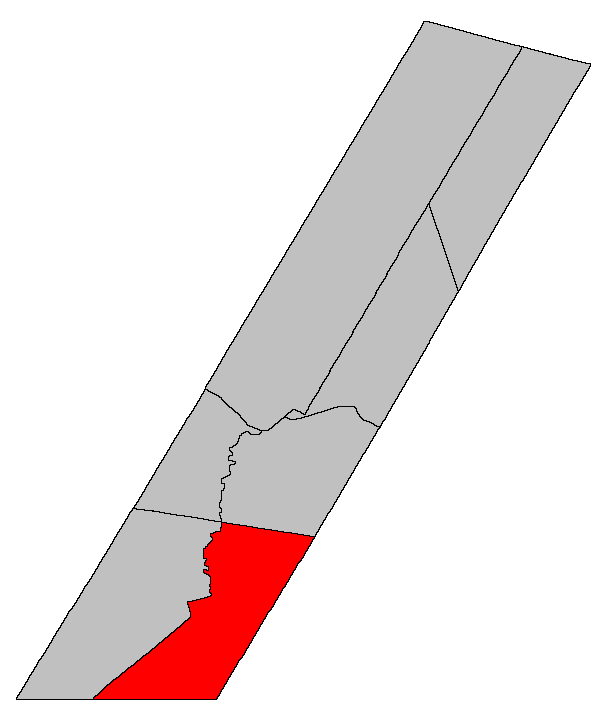
- Location within Sunbury County, New Brunswick
- Country: Canada
- Province: New Brunswick
- County: Sunbury County
- Erected: 1835

Area
  - Land: 341.74 km^{2} (131.95 sq mi)

Population (2021)
  - Total: 777
  - Density: 2.3/km^{2} (6.0/sq mi)
  - Change 2016-2021: ▼5.1%
  - Dwellings: 369
- Time zone: UTC-4 (AST)
  - Summer (DST): UTC-3 (ADT)

Blissville is a geographic parish in Sunbury County, New Brunswick, Canada.

Prior to the 2023 governance reform, for governance purposes it was divided between CFB Gagetown and the local service district of the parish of Blissville, which was a member of Capital Region Service Commission (RSC11).

== Origin of name ==
The parish was probably named in honour of John Murray Bliss, senior justice of the Supreme Court of New Brunswick at the time the Act erecting the parish was passed in 1834 but died before it became effective in January 1835.

== History ==
Blissville was erected in 1835 from Burton and Lincoln Parishes.

In 1874 Gladstone Parish was erected from the western part of Blissville.

In 1896 the land boundary with Gladstone was completely altered, adding a large area to Blissville; the boundary with Burton was altered along the Nerepis Road.

In 1949 the boundary with Burton was restored to its pre-1896 line.

== Boundaries ==
Blissville Parish is bounded:

- on the north beginning at a point on the eastern bank of the Oromocto River about 1.2 kilometres downstream of the mouth of Shaw Creek, then running south 66º east (Note: By the magnet of 1834, when declination in the area was between 16º and 17º west of north. The Territorial Division Act clause referring to magnetic direction bearings was omitted in the 1952 and 1973 Revised Statutes.) to the Queens County line;
- on the southeast by the Sunbury County line;
- on the south by the Charlotte County;
- on the west by a line beginning at a point on the Charlotte County about 2.9 kilometres west of the South Oromocto Lake Road, then running north 67º east (Note: By the magnet of 1896, when declination in the area was about 20º west of north.) about 19.2 kilometres to the rear line of grants along the western side of the South Branch Oromocto River, then northerly about 2.2 kilometres along the rear line of grants to the northern line of a grant to Nathaniel Hubbard, which is also the southern boundary of Fredericton Junction, then easterly to the river, then down the South Branch Oromocto River and the Oromocto River to the starting point.

== Communities ==
Communities at least partly within the parish; italics indicate a community expropriated for CFB Gagetown

- Blissville
- Central Blissville
- Germany
- Hoyt
- Hoyt Station
- Juvenile Settlement
- Mill Settlement
- Mill Settlement West
- Patterson
- Sand Brook
- Tweedsmuir

== Bodies of water ==
Bodies of water (Note: Not including brooks, ponds or coves.) at least partly in the parish:

- Oromocto River
  - South Branch Oromocto River
- Brizley Stream
- Piskahegan Stream
- Back Creek
- Bass Creek
- White Birch Lake

== Islands ==
Islands in the parish:

- Basley Island

== Other notable places ==
Parks, historic sites, and other noteworthy places in the parish.

- CFB Gagetown

== Demographics ==
Revised census figures based on the 2023 local governance reforms have not been released.

=== Population ===
Population trend

Census	Population	Change (%)
2016	819	▼11.6%
2011	926	▲9.2%
2006	848	▼13.7%
2001	983	

=== Language ===
Mother tongue (2016)

Language	Population	Pct (%)
English only	790	96.3%
French only	25	3.0%
Both English and French	5	0.6%
Other languages	0	0%

== Access Routes ==
Highways and numbered routes that run through the parish, including external routes that start or finish at the parish limits:

- Highways
  - Route 7

- Principal Routes
  - Route 101

- Secondary Routes:
  - Route 785

- External Routes:
  - None

== See also ==
- List of parishes in New Brunswick
