= Burton Parish =

Coordinates: 45.8014°N 66.405°W

Burton
- Parish
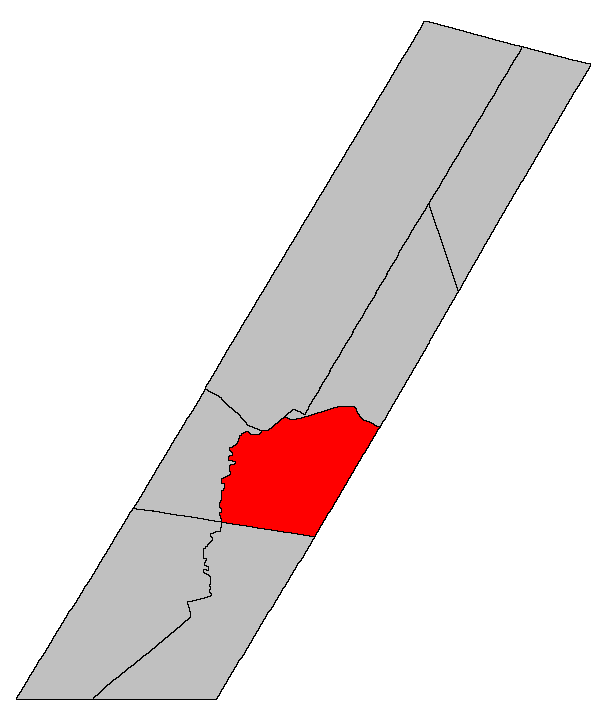
- Location within Sunbury County, New Brunswick
- Country: Canada
- Province: New Brunswick
- County: Sunbury County
- Erected: 1786

Area
  - Land: 258.39 km^{2} (99.76 sq mi)

Population (2021)
  - Total: 5,176
  - Density: 20/km^{2} (52/sq mi)
  - Change 2016-2021: ▲1.1%
  - Dwellings: 2,074
- Time zone: UTC-4 (AST)
  - Summer (DST): UTC-3 (ADT)
- Figures do not include portions within the town of Oromocto and the Oromocto 26 Indian reserve

Burton is a geographic parish in Sunbury County, New Brunswick, Canada.

Prior to the 2023 governance reform, for governance purposes it was divided between the town of Oromocto, the Indian reserve of Oromocto 26, CFB Gagetown, and the local service district of the parish of Burton. The town and LSD were both members of Capital Region Service Commission (RSC11).

== Origin of name ==
The parish was named in honour of Ralph Burton, military commander-in-chief in Montreal at the time of its establishment as a township.

== History ==
Burton was first established in 1765 as a Nova Scotia township.

Burton was erected in 1786 as one of the original parishes of Sunbury County. The parish extended further inland than the township.

In 1835 the rear of the parish was included in the newly erected Blissville Parish.

In 1896 the boundary with Blissville was altered along the Nerepis Road.

In 1949 the boundary with Blissville was changed back to its pre-1896 course.

== Boundaries ==
Burton Parish is bounded:

- on the north by the Saint John River;
- on the southeast by the Queens County line;
- on the south by a line beginning at a point on the Queens County line about 18.2 kilometres inland, then running north 66º west (Note: By the magnet of 1834 when declination in the area was between 16º and 17º west of north. The Territorial Division Act clause referring to magnetic direction bearings was omitted in the 1952 and 1973 Revised Statutes.) to the Oromocto River at a point about 1.2 kilometres downstream of the mouth of Shaw Creek;
- on the west and northwest by the Oromocto River;
- including Gilbert, Ox, and Ram Islands in the Saint John River.

== Communities ==
Communities at least partly within the parish; bold indicates an incorporated municipality or Indian reserve; italics indicate a community expropriated for CFB Gagetown

- Babbitt
- Burpees Corner
- Burton
- French Lake
- Geary
- Goan
- Greenfield Settlement
- Haneytown
- Hersey Corner
- Lauvina
- Lower Burton
- McGowans Corner
- **Oromocto**
  - Oromocto West
- **Oromocto 26**
- Shirley Settlement
- Swan Creek
- Victoria Settlement
- Waterville
- Woodside

== Bodies of water ==
Bodies of water (Note: Not including brooks, ponds or coves.) at least partly in the parish:

- Oromocto River
- Saint John River
  - Ox Island Channel
  - Sheffield Channel
- Rockwell Stream
- Fish Creek
- Kenney Creek
- Snake Creek
- Streets Creek
- Tapley Creek
- French Lake
- Swan Creek Lake

== Islands ==
Islands in the parish:

- Gilbert Island
- Ox Island
- Ram Island

== Other notable places ==
Parks, historic sites, and other noteworthy places in the parish.

- CFB Gagetown

== Demographics ==
Parish population total does not include Oromocto 26 Indian reserve and area within 2021 boundaries of Oromocto. Revised census figures based on the 2023 local governance reforms have not been released.

=== Population ===
**Population trend**

| Census | Population | Change (%) |
|---|---|---|
| 2016 | 5,119 | ▼5.6% |
| 2011 | 5,421 | ▲8.0% |
| 2006 | 5,019 | ▼0.4% |
| 2001 | 5,000 | |

=== Language ===
**Mother tongue (2016)**

| Language | Population | Pct (%) |
|---|---|---|
| English only | 4,595 | 90.0% |
| French only | 400 | 7.8% |
| Both English and French | 45 | 0.9% |
| Other languages | 65 | 1.3% |

== Access Routes ==
Highways and numbered routes that run through the parish, including external routes that start or finish at the parish limits:

- **Highways**
  - Route 2 (TCH)
  - Route 7
- **Principal Routes**
  - Route 102
- Secondary Routes:
  - None
- External Routes:
  - None

== See also ==
- List of parishes in New Brunswick
