= Lincoln Parish, New Brunswick =

Lincoln
- Parish
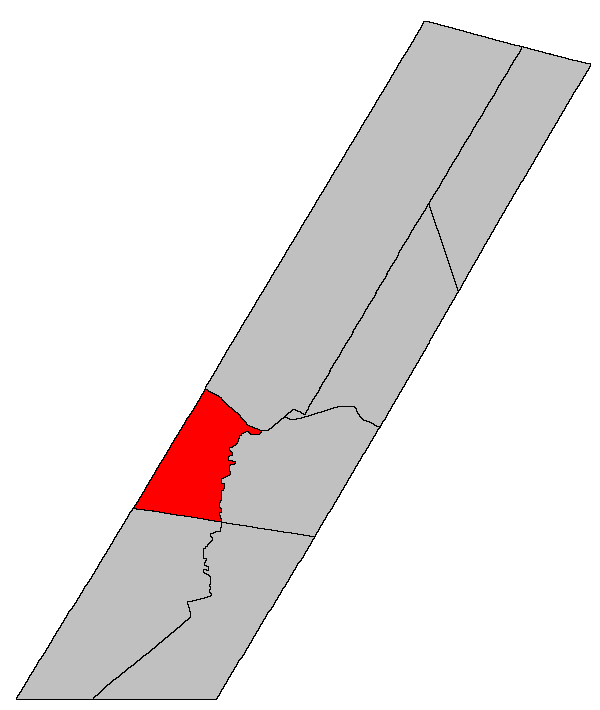
- Location within Sunbury County, New Brunswick
- Coordinates: 45.8975°N 66.57°W
- Country: Canada
- Province: New Brunswick
- County: Sunbury
- Erected: 1786

Area
  - Land: 159.44 km^{2} (61.56 sq mi)

Population (2021)
  - Total: 7,519
  - Density: 47.2/km^{2} (122/sq mi)
  - Change 2016-2021: ▲4.8%
  - Dwellings: 3,152
- Time zone: UTC-4 (AST)
  - Summer (DST): UTC-3 (ADT)
- Figures do not include portion within the city of Fredericton

Lincoln is a geographic parish in Sunbury County, New Brunswick, Canada.

Prior to the 2023 governance reform, for governance purposes it was divided between the city of Fredericton and the local service districts of Rusagonis-Waasis and the parish of Lincoln, all of which were members of Capital Region Service Commission (RSC11).

== Origin of name ==
The parish may have been named for its proximity to York County, as the traditional English counties of Lincolnshire and Yorkshire shared a border.

Another possible source is Lincoln, Massachusetts, former home of Captain Benjamin Glasier whose family settled there in March 1776 as the American War of Independence was beginning.

== History ==
Lincoln was erected in 1786 as one of Sunbury County's original parishes. It extended to Charlotte County and included most of Gladstone Parish.

In 1835 the rear of the parish was included in the newly erected Blissville Parish.

== Boundaries ==
Lincoln Parish is bounded:

- on the northeast by the Saint John River;
- on the southeast by the Oromocto River;
- on the southwest by a line beginning on the Oromocto River about 1.2 kilometres downstream of the mouth of Shaw Creek and running north 66º west (Note: By the magnet of 1834 when declination in the area was between 16º and 17º west of north. The Territorial Division Act clause referring to magnetic direction bearings was omitted in the 1952 and 1973 Revised Statutes.) to the York County line;
- on the northwest by the York County line;
- including Thatch Island in the Saint John River.

== Communities ==
Communities at least partly within the parish. bold indicates an incorporated municipality

- **Fredericton**
- Lincoln
- Lower Lincoln
- Nevers Road
- Rusagonis
- Rusagonis Station
- Sunpoke
- Waasis

== Bodies of water ==
Bodies of water (Note: Not including brooks, ponds or coves.) at least partly within the parish.

- Oromocto River
- Saint John River
- Little Waasis Stream
- Rusagonis Stream
- Waasis Stream
- The Thoroughfare
- Bear Creek
- Deer Creek
- Shaw Creek
- Wilmot Creek
- Sunpoke Lake

== Islands ==
Islands at least partly within the parish.

- Thatch Island

== Other notable places ==
Parks, historic sites, and other noteworthy places at least partly within the parish.

- Fredericton International Airport
- Vanier Industrial Park

== Demographics ==
Parish population does not include portion within Fredericton

=== Population ===
**Population trend**

Census	Population	Change (%)
2016	7,177	▲11.1%
2011	6,458	▲12.0%
2006	5,764	▲3.9%
2001	5,548	▲3.7%
1996	5,349	▲18.7%
1991	4,508	N/A

=== Language ===
**Mother tongue (2016)**

Language	Population	Pct (%)
English only	6,450	89.9%
French only	575	8.0%
Other languages	95	1.3%
Both English and French	55	0.8%

== See also ==
- List of parishes in New Brunswick
