= Gladstone Parish =

Coordinates: 45.616919°N 66.75293°W

Gladstone
- Parish
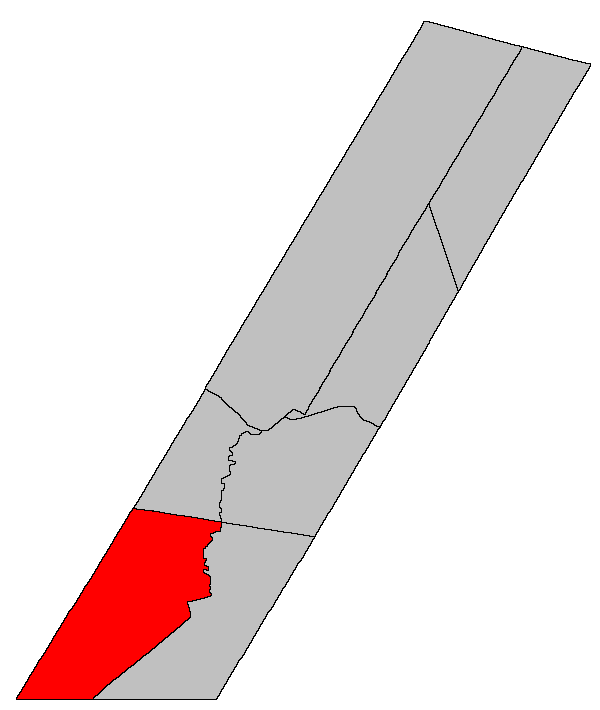
- Location within Sunbury County, New Brunswick
- Country: Canada
- Province: New Brunswick
- County: Sunbury County
- Erected: 1874

Area
  - Land: 362.08 km^{2} (139.80 sq mi)

Population (2021)
  - Total: 486
  - Density: 1.3/km^{2} (3.4/sq mi)
  - Change 2016-2021: ▲7.5%
  - Dwellings: 227
- Time zone: UTC-4 (AST)
  - Summer (DST): UTC-3 (ADT)
- Figures do not include portions within the villages of Fredericton Junction and Tracy

Gladstone is a geographic parish in Sunbury County, New Brunswick, Canada.

Prior to the 2023 governance reform, for governance purposes it was divided between the villages of Fredericton Junction and Tracy and the local service district of the parish of Gladstone, all of which were members of Capital Region Service Commission (RSC11).

== Origin of name ==
The parish was named in honour of William Ewart Gladstone, Prime Minister of the United Kingdom until his defeat shortly after the House of Assembly began its 1874 session.

== History ==
Gladstone was erected in 1874 from Blissville Parish.

In 1896 the land boundary with Blissville was changed to run along grant lines and magnetic bearing,

== Boundaries ==
Gladstone Parish is bounded:

- on the north by a line beginning at a point on the York County line about 3.3 kilometres [2.1 mi] southwesterly of Route 101, then running south 66º east (Note: By the magnet of 1834, when declination in the area was between 16º and 17º west of north. The Territorial Division Act clause referring to magnetic direction bearings was omitted in the 1952 and 1973 Revised Statutes.) to the Oromocto River;
- on the east and southeast by a line running up the Oromocto River and the South Branch Oromocto River to the northern line of a grant to Nathaniel Hubbard, which also serves as the southern boundary of Fredericton Junction, then southwesterly along the line to the rear of the grant, then southerly about 2.2 kilometres [1.4 mi] along the rear line of grants, then south 67º west (Note: By the magnet of 1896, when declination in the area was about 20º west of north.) to the Charlotte County line;
- on the south by the Charlotte County line;
- on the northwest by the York County line.

== Communities ==
Communities at least partly within the parish; bold indicates an incorporated municipality

- Bailey
- **Fredericton Junction**
- Little Lake
- Three Tree Creek
- **Tracy**
  - Klondike Settlement
- Tracyville
- Upper Tracy
- Vespra

== Bodies of water ==
Bodies of water (Note: Not including brooks, ponds or coves.) at least partly in the parish:

- Oromocto River
  - North Branch Oromocto River
- Peltoma Outlet
- Piskahegan Stream
- Porcupine Stream
- Yoho Stream
- Hardwood Creek
- Shaw Creek
- Shin Creek
- Three Tree Creek
- Peltoma Lake

== Islands ==
Islands in the parish:

- Curries Island
- MacGougans Island

== Other notable places ==
Parks, historic sites, and other noteworthy places in the parish.

- Russel Dam

== Demographics ==
Parish population total does not include Fredericton Junction or Tracy

=== Population ===
**Population trend**

Census	Population	Change (%)
2016	452	▼6.8%
2011	485	▼9.9%
2006	538	▲4.5%
2001	515	

=== Language ===
**Mother tongue (2016)**

Language	Population	Pct (%)
English only	430	95.6%
French only	15	3.3%
Both English and French	0	0%
Other languages	5	1.1%

== Access Routes ==
Highways and numbered routes that run through the parish, including external routes that start or finish at the parish limits:

- **Highways**
  - None
- **Principal Routes**
  - Route 101
- Secondary Routes:
  - Route 645
  - Route 785
- External Routes:
  - None

== See also ==
- List of parishes in New Brunswick
