= Fredericton Branch Railway =

The Fredericton Branch Railway is an historic Canadian railway that operated in New Brunswick.

== Incorporation ==
The Fredericton Railway Company pre-dated Confederation and was incorporated in 1866 to build a railway line from the European and North American Railway's "Western Extension" at Hartt's Mills to Fredericton. The route was surveyed north from Hartt's Mills through the communities of Rusagonis-Waasis, Doak and Salamanca to a location on the southern edge of the capital city's downtown.

== Construction ==
Construction began in early November 1867 at Salamanca and rails were laid from the fall of 1868 through the fall of 1869. The first passenger train arrived in Fredericton on 2 November 1869 and with the completion of the E&NA "Western Extension" 29 days later on 1 December, the city was connected by rail to Carleton and McAdam.

== Merger with NBR ==
In 1875, the Fredericton Branch Railway was incorporated and took over the operation of the line from Fredericton to Fredericton Junction (which had been renamed from Hartt's Mills). On September 26, 1883, the New Brunswick Railway (NBR) acquired the Fredericton Branch Railway for $150,000. The NBR had also acquired the New Brunswick and Canada Railway and the E&NA "Western Extension" (then called the Saint John and Maine Railway), thus with the purchase of the Fredericton Branch Railway, the NBR gained control of all the railways in western New Brunswick.

On July 1, 1890, the Canadian Pacific Railway leased the NBR for 999 years. Under CPR operation, the line to Fredericton (called the Fredericton Subdivision) saw expanded freight and passenger service, particularly after the Fredericton Railway Bridge was built by the Fredericton & St. Mary's Bridge Co. in 1889. The Fredericton & St. Mary's Bridge Co. was a subsidiary of the Canada Eastern Railway, which was later acquired by the Intercolonial Railway. The CPR received trackage rights over the bridge to connect its lines from South Devon to Minto and Norton in the east and Woodstock in the west.

In 1922, the CPR opened the new York Street Railway Station at the terminus of the Fredericton Subdivision in downtown Fredericton. This new brick station became the focal point of inter-city trains until passenger service to Fredericton was reduced during the 1950s and ceased on 28 April 1962.

From that date until 1981, CP's rail line to Fredericton carried exclusively freight traffic. CP operated a local freight train as a "turn" from Fredericton to the divisional yard at McAdam during the 1960s-1970s which was nicknamed "The Oriental" (the train received this moniker after a freight car of rice derailed near Tracy). This freight train was cancelled in the early 1980s after the divisional point at McAdam was eliminated; thereafter, freight for Fredericton was dropped off and picked up by a mainline Saint John-Montreal freight train at Fredericton Junction and delivered by a local train to Fredericton.

In 1981, VIA Rail cancelled the Atlantic passenger train service from Saint John to Montreal. To placate local concerns, VIA implemented RDC service from Halifax to Fredericton through Moncton, Saint John and Fredericton Junction. This development saw passenger rail service return to Fredericton for the first time in 19 years and VIA contracted CP to upgrade the trackage and speed of the Fredericton Subdivision.

The 1985 restoration of the Atlantic saw the RDC service to Fredericton cancelled and in 1988, all CPR lines east of Montreal were placed under the Canadian Atlantic Railway (CAR) business unit to address mounting financial losses.

In November 1993, the CAR abandoned the Fredericton Subdivision and the rails to New Brunswick's capital city were removed the following year.

== See also ==
- Canadian Pacific Railway
- New Brunswick Railway
- European and North American Railway
- International Railway of Maine
- Fredericton Railway Bridge
- Fredericton Junction, New Brunswick
- Harvey Station, New Brunswick
- McAdam, New Brunswick
