= New Brunswick Route 7 =

Highway in New Brunswick

Route 7
- Vanier Highway, Broad Road, Martinon Bypass
- Route 7 highlighted in red.

Route information
- Maintained by New Brunswick Department of Transportation
- Length: 97.3 km (60.5 mi)
- Existed: 1965–present

Major junctions
- North end: Route 101 in Fredericton
- Route 8 in Fredericton; Route 2 (TCH) near Oromocto
- South end: Route 1 in Saint John

Location
- Country: Canada
- Province: New Brunswick
- Counties: York, Sunbury, Queens, Kings, Saint John
- Major cities: Fredericton, Saint John

Highway system
- Provincial highways in New Brunswick; Former routes
← Route 4	→ Route 8

Route 7 is 97 kilometres (60 mi) long and runs from Fredericton, near an interchange with Route 8, to an interchange with Route 1 in Saint John. Most of the highway is either a divided expressway or has limited access.

Designated the Vanier Highway between Fredericton and an interchange with Route 2 (the Trans-Canada Highway) in Lincoln, Route 7 runs concurrently with Route 2 to Oromocto. From Oromocto, it turns south and passes through CFB Gagetown.

== History ==
The main road from Fredericton to Saint John was first numbered Route 7 in 1965. The original routing followed present-day Route 102 from Fredericton to Oromocto, and the "Broad Road" (formerly Route 2A) from Oromocto to Welsford. The Vanier Highway, originally Route 12 when it was partially opened in Fredericton, was redesignated as part of Route 7 when it was fully completed to Oromocto in 1976, and a section of the Broad Road through Geary was bypassed in the early 1980s. The towns of Grand Bay and Westfield were bypassed in 1986, with the former alignment of Route 7 renamed Route 177.

In 1991, Route 7 was extended south from its original southern end at Ocean West Way (Route 100) on Saint John's west side to Route 1.

Starting in 2007 planning commenced to construct animal fencing along a large section of Route 7. Construction began in the fall of 2007 and continuing during the Summer of 2008. Animal crossings were also constructed in various places. Because the majority of Route 7 runs through CFB Gagetown, environmental assessments and approval had to be obtained from the Department of National Defence.

In October 2013, the Welsford Bypass opened and the uncontrolled section of Route 7 was renamed Eagle Rock Road. This new section by-passes the village of Welsford.

An earlier Route 7 went from Perth-Andover to Maine. This was renumbered Route 19 in 1965, and is now Route 190.

== Exit list ==
From north to south:

County	Location	km	mi	Exit	Destinations	Notes
York	Fredericton	0.0	0.0		Prospect Street Route 101 (Regent Street) – New Maryland	Northern terminus; at-grade
York	Fredericton	0.5	0.31		Route 8 to Route 2 (TCH) / Route 105 – Edmundston, Miramichi	
York	Fredericton	1.3	0.81	1	Liverpool Street	Northbound right-in/right-out
York	Fredericton	2.3	1.4	2	Kimble Drive	
York	Fredericton	4.1	2.5	4	Doak Road	Southbound exit only
York	Fredericton	5.3	3.3	5	Wilsey Road, Alison Boulevard	
Sunbury	Lincoln	9.1	5.7	294 (Note: Route 2 exit number)	Route 2 (TCH) west – Edmundston	North end of Route 2 concurrency; northbound exit and southbound entrance
Sunbury	Lincoln	12.5	7.8	297	Nevers Road – Rusagonis-Waasis, Lincoln	
Sunbury	Oromocto	16.7	10.4	301	To Route 102 – Fredericton Airport	Southbound exit, northbound entrance
Sunbury	Oromocto	18.7	11.6	303	To Route 102 – Oromocto, CFB Gagetown, Geary, Fredericton Airport	
Sunbury	Oromocto	21.6	13.4	306	Route 2 (TCH) east – Moncton	South end of Route 2 concurrency; northbound entrance only
Sunbury		30.0	18.6	29	Broad Road – Geary, Fredericton Junction	At-grade
Queens	CFB Gagetown	51.4	31.9	51	Enniskillen Road – Camp Petersville	
Queens	Welsford	63.8	39.6	63	Route 101 – Welsford, Fredericton Junction	
Kings		72.0	44.7	71	Route 177 – Grand Bay-Westfield	
Kings	Grand Bay-Westfield	80.3	49.9	80	Route 102 to Route 177 – Grand Bay-Westfield, Arcadia	
Kings	Grand Bay-Westfield	86.5	53.7	86	To Route 177 / Colonel Nase Boulevard – Grand Bay-Westfield	
Saint John	Saint John	90.7	56.4	90	Route 177 – Grand Bay-Westfield	
Saint John	Saint John	96.7	60.1	96	Route 100 (Ocean West Way)	
Saint John	Saint John	97.3	60.5	97	Route 1 – Sussex, Lorneville, St. Stephen	Southern terminus
1.000 mi = 1.609 km; 1.000 km = 0.621 mi: Concurrency terminus; Incomplete access

== See also ==
- List of New Brunswick provincial highways
