= Waterville, New Brunswick =

Waterville may refer to two different locations in the Canadian province of New Brunswick:

- Waterville, Carleton County, New Brunswick, a rural community
- Waterville, Sunbury County, New Brunswick, a rural community
