= Fredericton Railway Bridge =

Bridge in Fredericton, New Brunswick, Canada

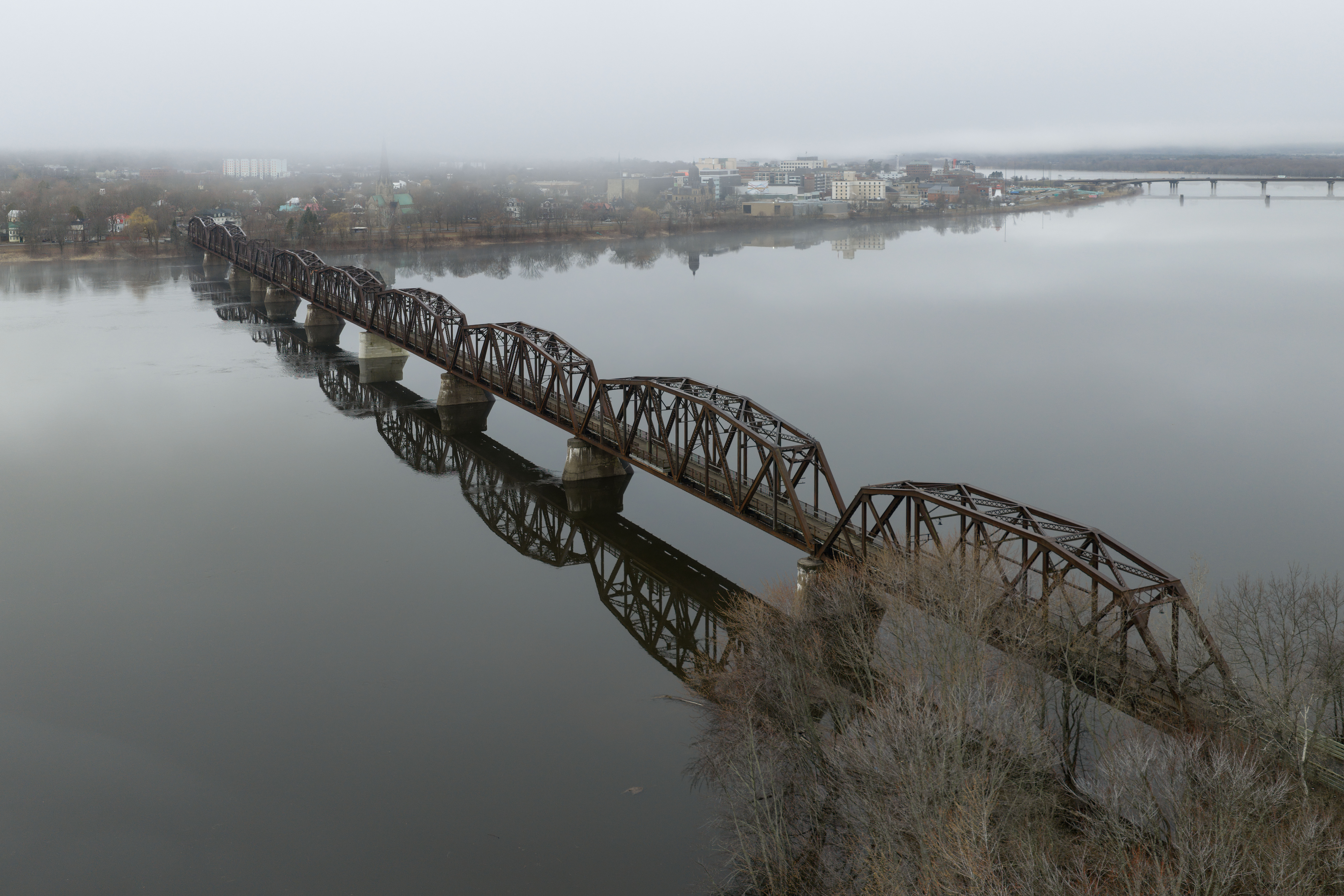
- The Fredericton Railway Bridge, now called the Bill Thorpe Walking Bridge.
- Coordinates: 45°57′26″N 66°37′43″W
- Carries: Pedestrians and cyclists
- Crosses: Saint John River
- Locale: Fredericton, New Brunswick
- Official name: Bill Thorpe Walking Bridge

Characteristics
- Design: Steel truss
- Total length: 581 metres (1,906 ft)
- Clearance above: 7.6 metres (24 ft 11 in)

History
- Construction start: 1887
- Opened: 1889
- Closed: 1996 (trains); pedestrian use began the following year

Statistics
- Daily traffic: Not reported

Location
- Interactive map of Fredericton Railway Bridge

The Fredericton Railway Bridge is a former railway bridge in Fredericton, New Brunswick, Canada now used to carry pedestrians and cyclists.

It crosses the Saint John River from the east end of Fredericton's central business district on the west bank of the river to the former community of South Devon (amalgamated into Fredericton in 1945) on the east bank.

Since 1997, it has been used as a pedestrian bridge and is part of the Sentier NB Trail system and also part of the Trans Canada Trail. Fredericton claims it is the "world's longest walking bridge."

On June 7, 2008, the bridge was renamed the Bill Thorpe Walking Bridge, after a founder of the Fredericton Trail System. As of 2018, over 600,000 users cross the bridge every year.

In 2022 the bridge became the start point of the “Bill Thorpe Walking Bridge parkrun” which is a 5 km event which takes place weekly on a Saturday utilising the bridge and the South Riverfront trail.

The overpass beneath the bridge along Waterloo Row has a low clearance and has been known to trap transport trucks attempting to pass underneath. There have been at least 15 incidents since 2007 where trucks have been lodged in the underpass, with three occurring between September and October 2025.

== Structure ==
The bridge consists of 9 spans crossing a distance of 581 metres (1,906 ft) over water and was constructed in 1938. It is a through truss design built entirely of steel and sits upon 8 concrete piers in the water and 2 concrete abutments, 1 on each bank.

The bridge has a vertical clearance of 7.6 metres (24 ft 11 in) for vessels above the navigation channel which runs under the third span from the west bank; this span is a swing span and was used to permit passage of river vessels with a higher air draught. The swing span was last operated in 1976 to permit the passage of barges upriver carrying construction equipment for the Westmorland Street Bridge project.

== History ==
A railway bridge had been proposed in the Fredericton area since the 1860s after an initial survey by the European and North American Railway "Western Extension" project.

The E&NA "Western Extension" was building the line connecting St. Croix, New Brunswick with an existing E&NA line from Saint John to Shediac. Initial surveys of the line east from the Canada–United States border at Vanceboro-St. Croix had proposed a route due east from what would become Harvey Station to the Saint John River near Kingsclear, passing through the west end of Fredericton and crossing to the east bank of the river before continuing along the shore of Grand Lake to connect with the Saint John-Shediac line near Salisbury. This project became such a certainty by the mid-1860s that the city of Fredericton actually moved its entire agricultural exhibition grounds (at great expense) from a location near the present-day York Street Railway Station to the current location of the Fredericton Exhibition in order to accommodate this railway project.

Further E&NA surveys, along with significant lobbying from the city of Saint John, saw the "Western Extension" project altered to run from Saint John's west end, northwest to Harvey and then west to McAdam, thereby avoiding Fredericton by approximately 40 kilometres (25 mi). This line opened in 1869 and forced the construction of the Fredericton Branch Railway to serve the capital city.

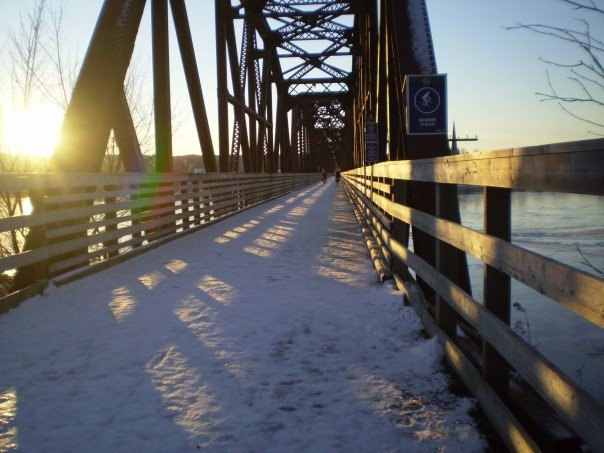
The walking bridge in winter

The dream of a railway bridge at Fredericton did not die with the failure of the Harvey-Fredericton-Salisbury route however. Local Fredericton industrialist Alexander Gibson pursued construction of a railway from the village of Devon where the Nashwaak River joined the Saint John River (and where Gibson had several mills), upriver to Hartland, Grand Falls and Edmundston. Surveys were commissioned in 1866 and he formed the New Brunswick Land and Railway Company in 1870. Construction from Devon to Newburg on the east bank of the river opposite Woodstock took place from 1871 to 1873 and from Newburg to Edmundston from 1871 to 1878.

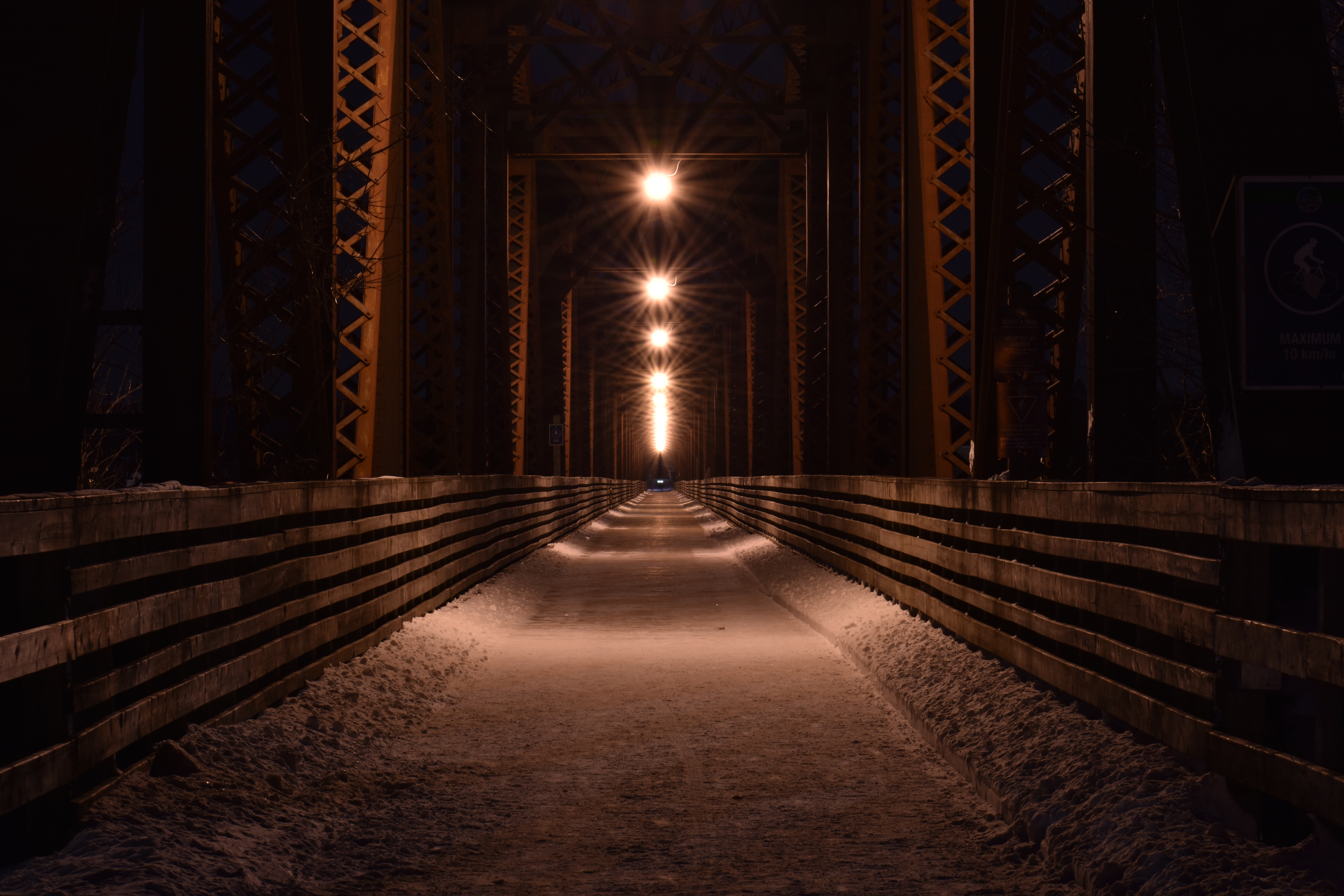
The walking bridge on a winter night

At the beginning of this ambitious scheme, Gibson incorporated the Fredericton & St. Mary's Bridge Co. in 1871 to construct a bridge across the Saint John River at Fredericton however the capital requirements for the NBL&RC saw the project put on hold for a decade.

The 1880s brought a period of massive ownership consolidation in the New Brunswick railway industry when Gibson's NBL&RC changed its name to the New Brunswick Railway (NBR). In 1878, the NBL&RC had acquired the Aroostook Valley Railway, followed by the New Brunswick and Canada Railway in 1882, the E&NA's "Western Extension" along with the Fredericton Branch Railway in 1883. Within 5 years, the NBR controlled every railway in western New Brunswick.

Gibson and his partners began construction on the Northern and Western Railway in 1884 and built the line from Devon up the Nashwaak River valley and then the Southwest Miramichi River valley to the Gulf of St. Lawrence port at Loggieville. As part of this project, Gibson again proposed to build a railway bridge over the Saint John River and in 1885, he incorporated the Fredericton and St. Mary's Railway Bridge Co.

Construction began in 1887 with the laying of the first foundation stone, assisted by Prime Minister of Canada, Sir John A. Macdonald and his wife Lady Macdonald. The bridge was operational in 1889 and was a subsidiary company to the Northern and Western Railway.

On July 1, 1890, the Canadian Pacific Railway obtained control of the NBR with a lease for 999 years. The CPR obtained trackage rights over Gibson's railway bridge to connect its line to Fredericton with the line from Devon to Woodstock.

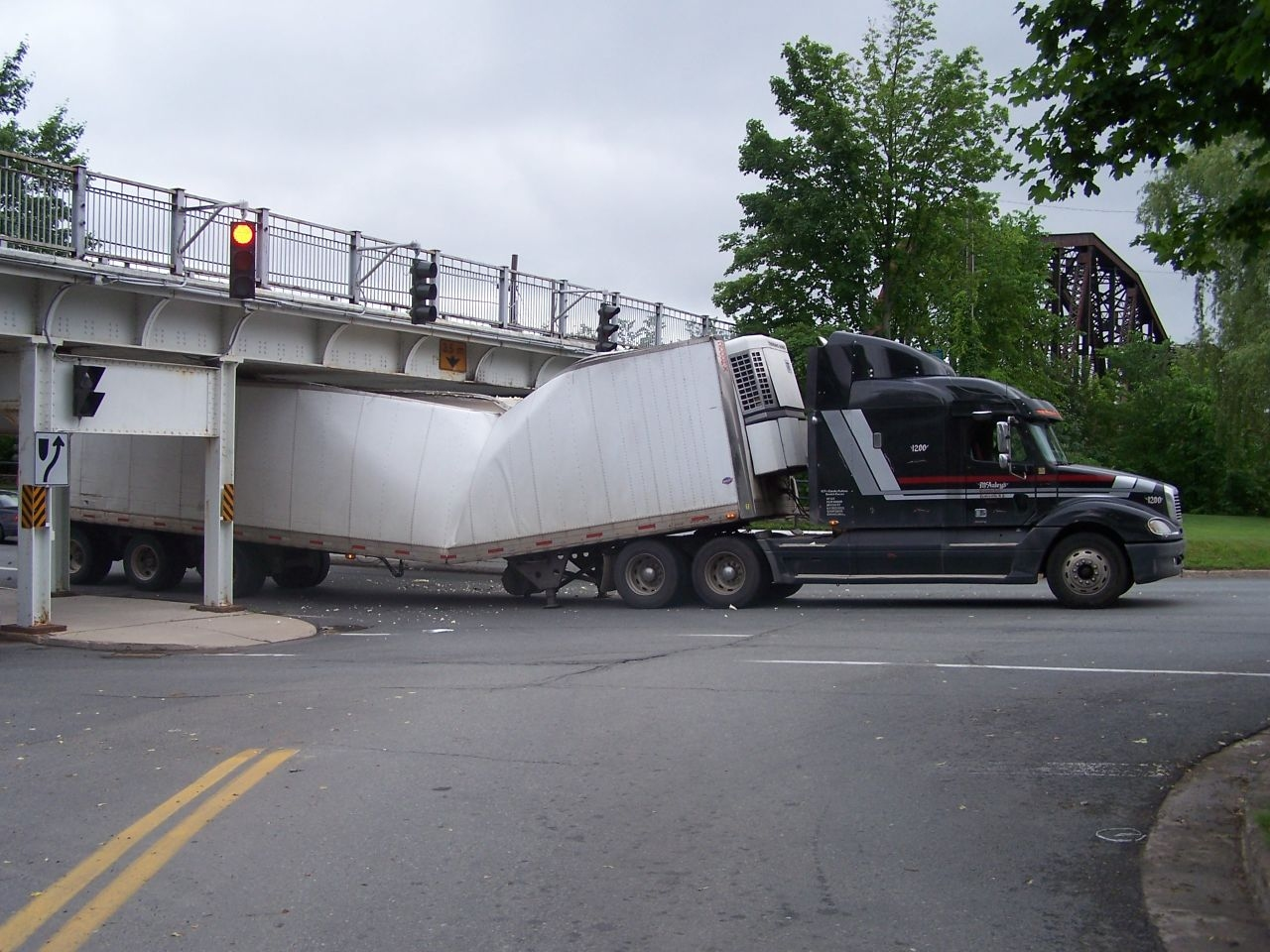
Truck fails to clear the bridge underpass on Waterloo Row, 2006.

The Northern and Western Railway was renamed to the Canada Eastern Railway in 1890 and was purchased in 1904 by a federal Crown corporation the Intercolonial Railway (ICR) to give the railway access to the provincial capital. The ICR operated the line from Fredericton to the Miramichi River valley as well as the Fredericton railway bridge. The ICR was merged into the Canadian National Railways (CNR) in 1918.

The original bridge was heavily damaged by ice and flood waters in the spring freshet of March 1936. CNR replaced it with the current structure which was officially opened by federal Minister of Transport, the Honourable C. D. Howe, on June 1, 1938. The ceremony was attended by hundreds of local citizens to celebrate the restoration of rail service across the river which had been severed 17 months earlier.

Rail traffic in Fredericton declined during the post-war era as new highways were opened and shippers converted to trucks. The decline in traffic resulted in a decline in service which was apparent by the 1980s. Railway deregulation in the late 1980s and early 1990s saw CPR's Canadian Atlantic Railway subsidiary abandon freight service through Fredericton, including its trackage rights on CN over this bridge in November 1993. CN abandoned its Nashwaak Subdivision, including the Fredericton Railway Bridge, in 1995 however an emergency shipment of coal to the heating plant at CFB Gagetown was authorized over the track as the final freight train through Fredericton in March 1996.

== Rail trail ==
CN transferred ownership of its properties, including the bridge to the provincial government and the structure was converted to a pedestrian and cycling bridge using federal and provincial government funding as a "millennium project" for use as a recreational rail trail; this conversion to pedestrian and cycling use saw the bridge deck planked over and safety guardrails installed. Today the bridge is a popular part of the Sentier NB Trail and is a component of the Trans Canada Trail.

== See also ==
- List of bridges in Canada
