= Oromocto (ship) =

Several ships have been named Oromocto for the Oromocto River or its shipbuilding town in New Brunswick, Canada:

== Oromocto (1796 ship) ==
- Oromocto was a snow of 201 tons (bm), or 201 launched at Saint John, New Brunswick in 1796. Oromocto first appeared in Lloyd's Register (LR) in 1796 with Bourne, master, Miles &Co., owners, and voyage St John to Cowes. Lloyd's List reported in May 1798 that Oromocto, Bourne, master, was believed to have been captured. She was on a voyage from Halifax, Nova Scotia to Antigua when captured. Lloyd's List reported in April 1799 that Oromocto, Watt, master, had foundered at sea in April 1799, whilst on a voyage from Liverpool to New Brunswick. Her crew were rescued.

== Oromocto (1813 ship) ==
- Oromocto (1813 ship) was launched at Oromocto. The 393-ton (bm) full-rigged ship traded between England and the Caribbean. In September 1816, she was the only ship at Port au Prince not to be driven ashore in a hurricane. She started trading between England and India in 1817, as an East India Company licensed ship. In 1820 she became leaky on her way back to England from India and Rio de Janeiro and put into Maranham, Brazil, where she was condemned in February 1821 and broken up.

== Oromocto (1839 ship) ==
- Oromocto (1839 ship) was a barque of 609 tons (bm), built at Oromocto. Oromocto started to break up in the North Atlantic in position 47.15°N 36.46°W, during a gale on 17 September 1871, while on a voyage from Quebec to River Tyne with timber. All on board took to the rigging, from whence Captain Kirby fell and was drowned, as were seven of the crew; after the ship foundered, the remaining nine crew were picked up between three other ships and landed safely. At the time of her loss she was owned by J Snowdon & Company of Newcastle-on-Tyne.

== Oromocto (1871 ship) ==
- Oromocto (1871 ship) was a brigantine of 458 GRT launched at Oromocto. She stranded in South Bay, Wexford, Ireland on 12 November 1876, Liverpool for Saint John, New Brunswick with general cargo, after three of her crew were lost from the rigging. The ship was sold on the beach at auction in January 1877 to Liverpool owners, and refloated on 18 April. She took the ground again, but was refloated on 30 June and returned to service after repair at Liverpool In 1882 Oromocto was sold at Valparaíso for service on the Chilean coast.
