= New Brunswick Route 640 =

Highway in New Brunswick, Canada

Coordinates: 45.841477°N 66.814728°W

Route 640

Route information
- Maintained by New Brunswick Department of Transportation
- Length: 36 km (22 mi)

Major junctions
- North end: Route 102 in Fredericton
- Route 8 in Fredericton; Route 2 (TCH) near Hanwell
- South end: Route 3 in Acton

Location
- Country: Canada
- Province: New Brunswick

Highway system
- Provincial highways in New Brunswick; Former routes
| ← Route 636 | → Route 645 |

Route 640 is a 35.9-kilometre (22.3 mi) long mostly north–south secondary highway in the southwestern portion of New Brunswick, Canada. Most of the route is in Prince William Parish.

The route starts at Route 102 in Fredericton where it is known as Hanwell Road. It passes Odell Park and travels southwest to exit 3 on Route 8. The road then travels across Route 2 at exit 281 as it enters Hanwell. The route passes The Hanwell Recreational Park. Mazzerolle Settlement Road provides access between Route 640 and Route 2 (at exit 271) and access to Kingsclear. The route passes Yoho Lake as it enters Yoho, and it then crosses a branch of Jewetts Cove before entering Hurley Corner. From there, the route passes the northern terminus of Route 645 before ending in Acton at Route 3.
