= Lincoln Parish =

Lincoln Parish may refer to:

- Lincoln Parish, New Brunswick, Canada
- Lincoln Parish, Louisiana, United States
- Lincoln Parish (musician), former member of the band Cage the Elephant
