= Geary, New Brunswick =

Coordinates: 45.779975°N 66.476897°W

Location of Geary in New Brunswick

Geary is a Canadian rural community in Sunbury County, New Brunswick. It is often considered to be in four small parts: Haneytown, Waterville-Sunbury, Geary, and French Lake.

It is located south of Oromocto and borders the Oromocto River to the west and C.F.B. Gagetown training area to the south and east.

Geary is best known as being the location of Speedway 660, the largest auto racing track in Atlantic Canada.

== History ==
Geary was first settled by New Englander loyalists around 1810, who named it New Niagara. This name later shortened over time, becoming the name Geary.

== See also ==
- List of communities in New Brunswick
