= Acton, New Brunswick =

Acton
- Interactive map of Acton
- Coordinates: 45.741269°N 66.959045°W
- Country: Canada
- Province: New Brunswick
- County: York
- Parish: Manners Sutton Parish
- Time zone: UTC-4 (AST)
  - Summer (DST): UTC-3 (ADT)
- Area codes: 506 and 428

Acton is a populated place in Manners Sutton Parish, New Brunswick, Canada. It is served by New Brunswick Route 3 and New Brunswick Route 640. The nearest post office is in Upper Kent, New Brunswick, although there was a post office in Acton from 1865 to 1870. Acton may be named for John Dalberg-Acton, 1st Baron Acton (1834–1902), a British Liberal Party politician who supported Home Rule for Ireland.

== Cemetery ==
Acton Presbyterian Church is located at 4125 Route 640 in Acton. The Acton Presbyterian Cemetery, identified on a sign only as Acton Cemetery, is located across the road at 4128 Route 640. The cemetery's act of incorporation calls it the Acton Cemetery Company.
