= Fredericton station =

Railway station in New Brunswick, Canada

Fredericton
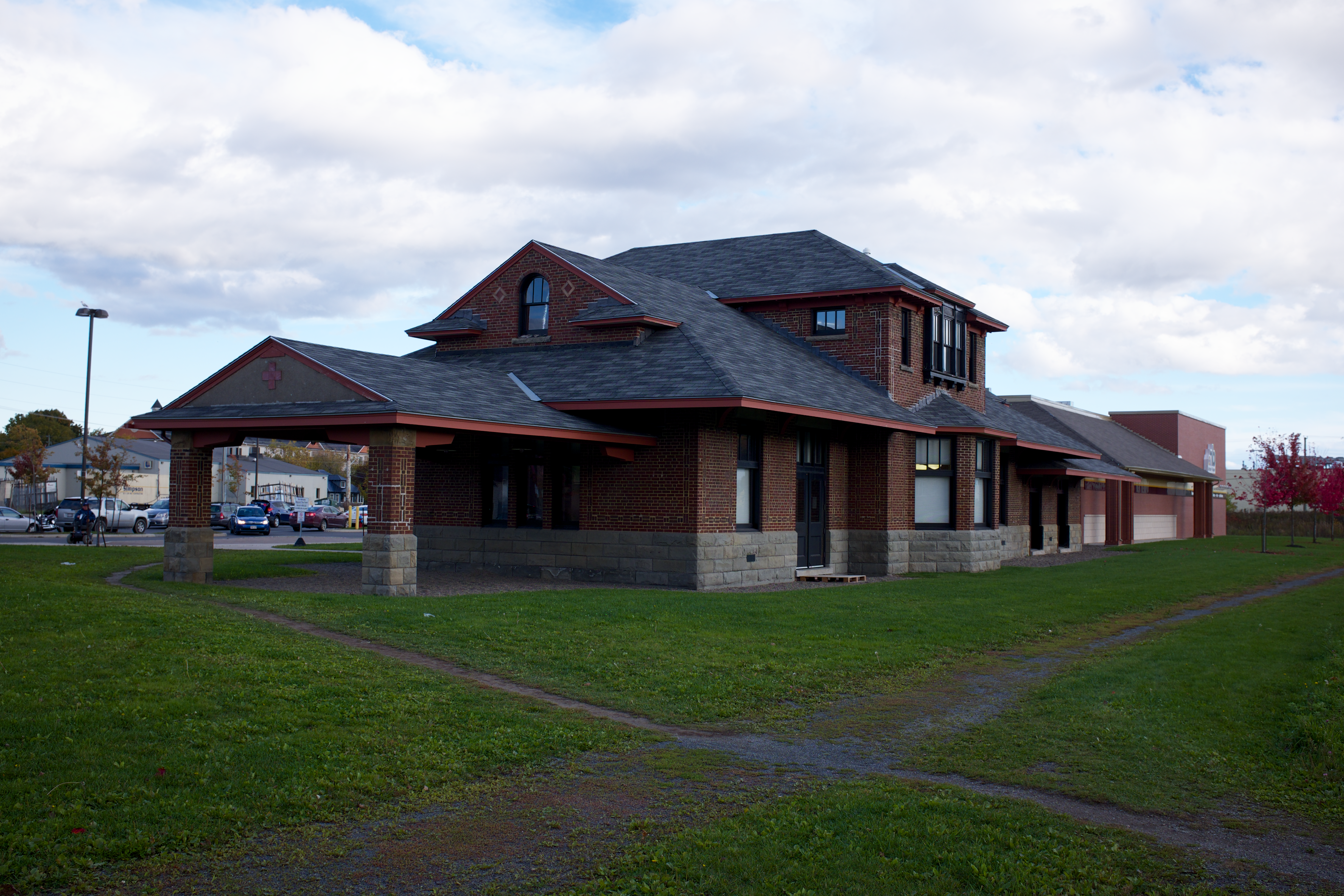

General information
- Location: 380 York Street, Fredericton, New Brunswick; Canada
- Coordinates: 45°57′23″N 66°38′53″W
- Line: CP Fredericton Subdivision
- Tracks: removed

History
- Opened: 1923
- Closed: 1985

Former services
Preceding station	Canadian Pacific Railway	Following station
Terminus	Fredericton – Fredericton Junction	Salamanca toward Fredericton Junction

Heritage Railway Station (Canada)
- Designated: 1991
- Reference no.: 4520
Location

The Fredericton station, also known as York Street station and Union Station, is a former Canadian Pacific Railway station located on York Street in Fredericton, New Brunswick, Canada.

The station opened in 1923 and is a brick structure with sandstone trim; it is distinguished by a tapestry brick patterning which is rare in Fredericton. The station has a hip-roof profile typical of CPR stations of the era and is one of the few brick railway stations remaining in New Brunswick. A covered portico at the west end of the building faced York Street, while the east end contained baggage rooms and freight offices. The building replaced a wooden station erected in 1869 by the European and North American Railway.

The station was visited by then Princess Elizabeth on a royal tour on 6 November 1951.

== 1962 service discontinuation ==
Passenger service on the CP Fredericton Subdivision ended on April 28, 1962, forcing Fredericton residents to travel to Fredericton Junction to use the Atlantic Limited service on the Saint John-Montreal main line. The York Street Railway Station was used as office space for employees with CP Rail's freight services in the Fredericton area, although the passenger waiting areas, ticket counter and baggage areas were unused.

== 1981-1985 service resumption ==
In 1978, CP passenger service was transferred to Via Rail and in 1981, Via Rail cancelled the Atlantic service on CP's Saint John-Montreal main line. In its place, Via Rail implemented a daily RDC Dayliner from Fredericton to Halifax via Saint John and Moncton. This required significant track upgrades to the CP Fredericton Subdivision as well as re-opening the York Street Railway Station for passenger use by Via Rail. The resumption of the Atlantic service in 1985 saw the RDC Dayliner service from Halifax-Fredericton cancelled and the York Street Railway Station once again returned to office space for CP Rail freight employees. In 1988, all CP Rail operations east of Montreal were grouped under a new business unit called the Canadian Atlantic Railway.

== 1993 abandonment ==
In the fall of 1993, CP Rail abandoned CAR lines in the Saint John River valley, including the CP Fredericton Subdivision. The York Street Railway Station was left abandoned with the other railway properties in the area, such as the Burtts Corner railway station and the Woodstock railway station. The tracks were removed by CP Rail in 1994. On January 1, 1995, CP Rail's remaining CAR operations in New Brunswick (including abandoned branch lines such as the one to Fredericton) were sold to the New Brunswick Southern Railway, a subsidiary of regional industrial conglomerate J.D. Irving Limited.

The Canadian Pacific Railway began operations on July 1, 1890, by leasing the New Brunswick Railway for a period of 999 years. The NBR Co. had been granted massive land holdings by the provincial government during its construction in the 1870s but CPR had little use for such property aside from the NBR Co's rail corridors. The timber lands were frequently leased to forestry companies, however in the 1940s, industrialist K.C. Irving (then-owner of J.D. Irving Ltd.) made an offer to CPR to purchase the NBR Co. for the timber rights and that CPR's lease for the rail corridors could be maintained with NBR Co. as a J.D. Irving Ltd. subsidiary.

When CP Rail abandoned rail service to Fredericton in 1993 and removed the tracks, ownership of the rail corridor and structures on former railway property was left with the NBR Co., a J.D. Irving Ltd. subsidiary. And the other J.D. Irving subsidiary, the New Brunswick Southern Railway - an operating railway company which took over providing rail service on remaining unabandoned CP Rail lines in the province in 1995 - operates its track through rail corridors owned by fellow subsidiary NBR Co.

== Structure degradation ==
The York Street Railway Station is protected from demolition under the federal Heritage Railway Stations Protection Act (1985). This act prevents the station's destruction by an active railway company or a railway holding company (such as the NBR Co.). However, the act does not stipulate that a railway company owning such a heritage railway station must maintain the structure, therefore it has been allowed to degrade over the years.

In the years since the 1993 abandonment of CP Rail service to Fredericton, the York Street Railway Station's structure has degraded significantly, primarily through holes in the roof and lack of heat in the building during the winter months where the freeze/thaw cycle has proven damaging. The brick exterior appears to be structurally sound, however the roof has collapsed in some areas, allowing precipitation to enter the building.

Trespassers have entered the structure at will since its abandonment, with extensive graffiti markings on the walls and even small fires being set inside. The dilapidated condition of this heritage railway station has resulted in numerous calls upon local municipal officials as well as federal and provincial authorities and owner J.D. Irving Ltd. to maintain the structure, or at least allow preventative maintenance to prevent further deterioration.

J.D. Irving Ltd. has been attempting to sell various parcels of the former CP Rail yard in Fredericton, such as the large parcel at the east end of the yard fronting Regent Street which now houses a Sobeys supermarket. These properties are considered to be prime real estate by the company and it has indicated that the York Street Railway Station will not be restored unless J.D. Irving Ltd. receives an economic return on the property. As of 2007, the parcels surrounding and including the York Street Railway Station have not been sold for development and J.D. Irving has refused to spend what it estimates to be a $2.1 million renovation to restore the structure without a business case.

J.D. Irving Ltd. came into ownership of the McAdam railway station, a massive stone structure that is at least four times the size of the York Street station (and the largest railway station in the province) in 1995. The NBR Co. owned the land that CP Rail operated upon in McAdam and this station was also prevented from demolition by the federal Heritage Railway Station Preservation Act. The tiny village of McAdam, with a flat real estate market, meant that the McAdam railway station property that the J.D. Irving Ltd. subsidiaries inherited from CP Rail had little re-sale potential, therefore J.D. Irving Ltd. donated ownership of the entire structure to the village, something which it refused to do in Fredericton.

The legal dilemma for the York Street Railway Station has left the station building to deteriorate further and led to the creation of a lobby group named Fredericton Friends of the Railway Inc. which is attempting to coordinate public and private sector support for restoring the structure. A public lobby in local newspapers has been ongoing for several years, however municipal authorities claim to have no ability to enforce unsightly premises legislation on the station, since it is governed under federal railways legislation (despite the railway station now being physically cut off from any potential restoration of rail service as a result of the Sobeys development to the east).

The Fredericton Heritage Trust, Fredericton Trails Coalition, Fredericton Chamber of Commerce, Fredericton Friends of the Railway, as well as numerous other groups are continuing the lobby campaign to have the building restored to its former glory and repurposed as part of a comprehensive redevelopment of the former industrial district bordered by the York Street Railway Station, the Hartt Shoe Company factory and the Chestnut Canoe Company factory.

The Fredericton Friends of the Railway Inc. was formed around 2002. The first president, Bill Thorpe died and the presidency was taken over by Tim Scammell of New Maryland. Tim Scammell stepped down as president in 2008 following his election onto the Council of the Village of New Maryland. Steve Boyko took over as president until May 2009 at which time he moved from the Fredericton area to Manitoba. Currently Tim Scammell has returned as president.

The current lobby effort is upon the City of Fredericton to purchase the parcel of the former CP Rail yard from J.D. Irving Ltd. which would include the station, thereby transferring its ownership to the public and permitting restoration.

Recent interest has been expressed in the station by the New Brunswick Liquor Corporation and the Royal Canadian Legion Fredericton Branch 4.

The building was added to the Heritage Canada Foundation's list of the top 10 most endangered heritage places in the country.

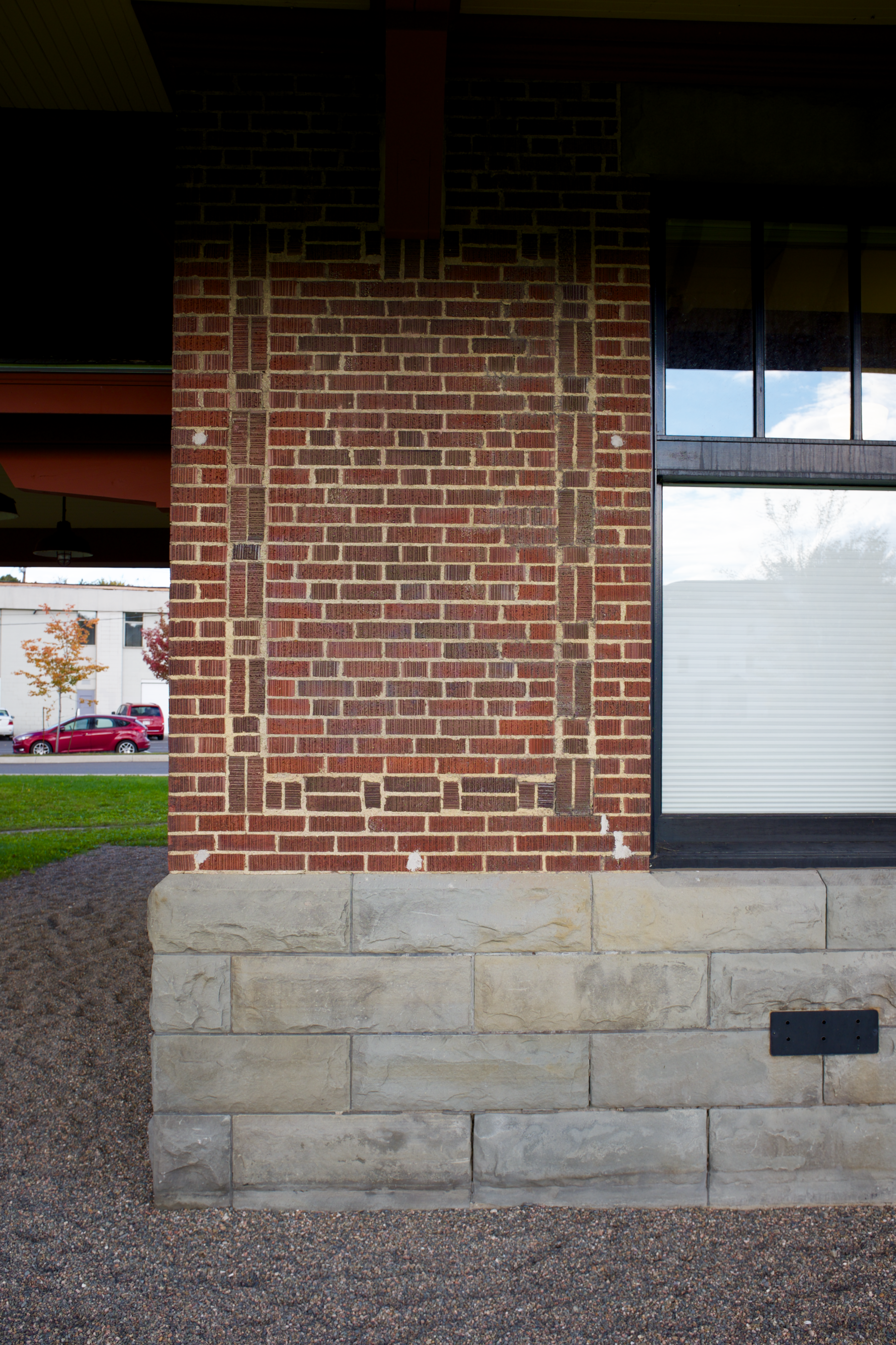
Tapestry brick patterning

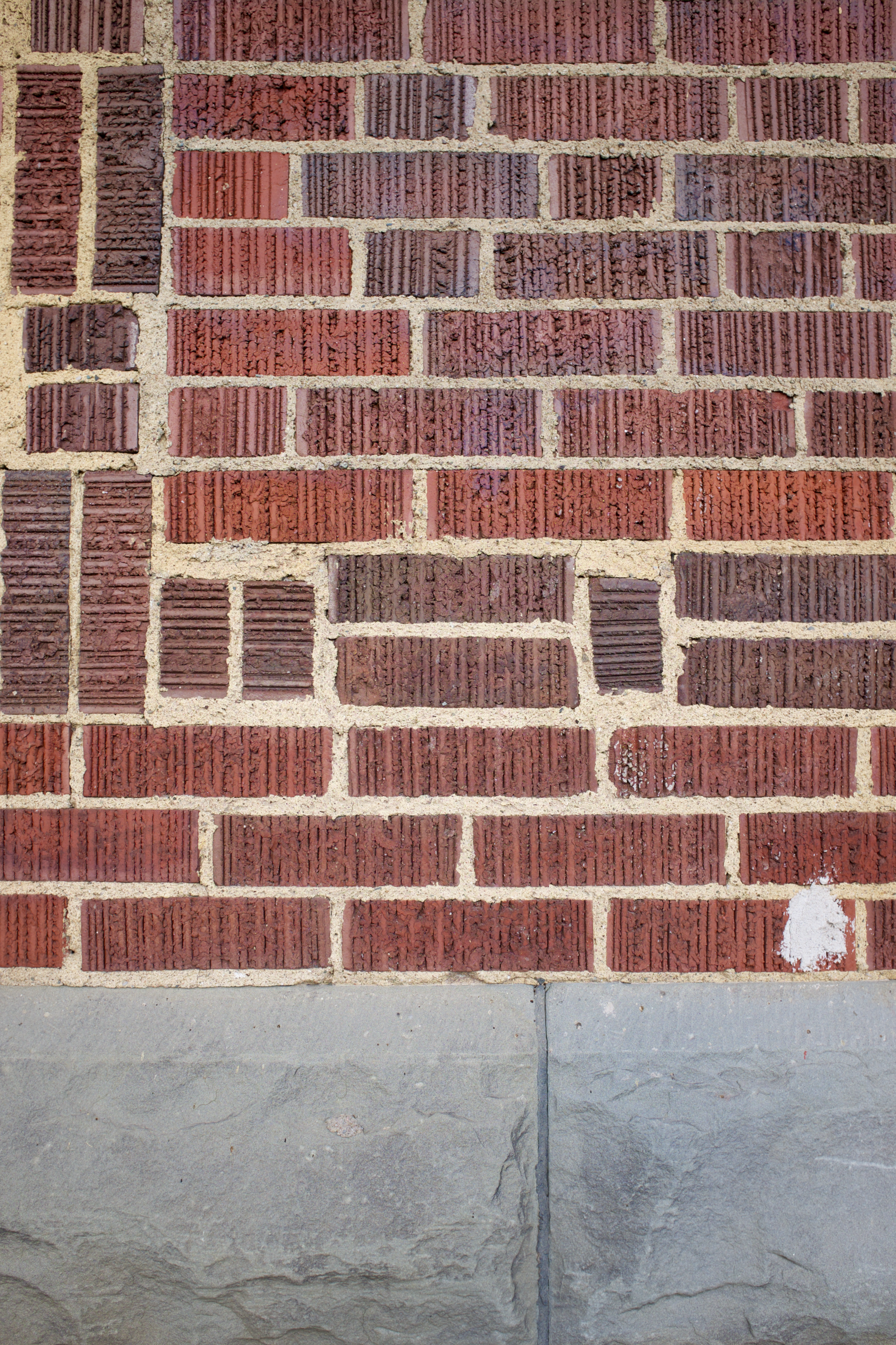
Tapestry brick patterning close up

== New development ==
On September 18, 2009, details of the plan to refurbish Fredericton's York Street train station into an Alcool NB Liquor retail outlet were announced by Alcool NB Liquor, J.D. Irving, Limited and the Province of New Brunswick. The exterior of the station will be restored by J.D. Irving Ltd., as per the federal Heritage Railway Stations Protection Act. The interior brick walls will remain intact, and the historical detail will be incorporated in the interior décor. The new store will be a unique concept for Alcool NB Liquor. The building has been fully refurbished and restored and is in use as an Alcool NB Liquor retail outlet.
