= New Brunswick Route 101 =

Highway in New Brunswick, Canada

Route 101

Route information
- Maintained by New Brunswick Department of Transportation
- Length: 75.94 km (47.19 mi)
- Existed: 1965–present

Major junctions
- North end: Route 102 in Fredericton
- Route 7 in Fredericton; Route 8 in Fredericton; Route 2 (TCH) in New Maryland
- South end: Route 7 in Welsford

Location
- Country: Canada
- Province: New Brunswick
- Major cities: New Maryland, Tracy, Fredericton Junction

Highway system
- Provincial highways in New Brunswick; Former routes
← Route 100	→ Route 102

Route 101 is 76 kilometres long and runs from downtown Fredericton to a junction with Route 7 in Welsford.

The highway follows Regent Street from downtown Fredericton up a large hill to the edge of the city, where it continues south to New Maryland, Nasonworth, Beaver Dam Tracyville and Tracy at Route 645. From Tracy, the highway turns east along the South Branch of the Oromocto River to Fredericton Junction. Route 101 then turns southeast, paralleling the New Brunswick Southern Railway line through Blissville, Hoyt and Wirral crossing Route 7 to its end at Eagle Rock road at Welsford.

== Major intersections ==
County	Location	km	mi	Destinations	Notes
Queens	Welsford	0.0	0.0	Route 7 (Highway 7)	Interchange, southern terminus
Sunbury	Central Blissville	32.6	20.3	Route 785 (Route 785)	
Sunbury	Tracy	43.1	26.8	Route 645 (Route 645)	
York	Nasonworth	61.9	38.5	Route 655 (Route 655)	
York	New Maryland	71.2	44.2	Route 2 (Trans-Canada Highway)	
York	Fredericton	74.6	46.4	Route 8 (Fredericton-Miramichi Highway)	
York	Fredericton	74.8	46.5	Route 7 (Fredericton-Saint John Highway)	
York	Fredericton	78.6	48.8	Route 102 (Queen St)	Northern Terminus, roadway continues as Regent St. to Westmoreland Bridge
1.000 mi = 1.609 km; 1.000 km = 0.621 mi: Incomplete access

== History ==
- Route 101 was known as Route 28 until 1965.
- October 2013 the route was extended over a new section of Route 7 and now ends at Eagle Rock Road at Welsford.

== See also ==
- List of New Brunswick provincial highways
