= Air Canada Flight 646 =

1997 aviation accident

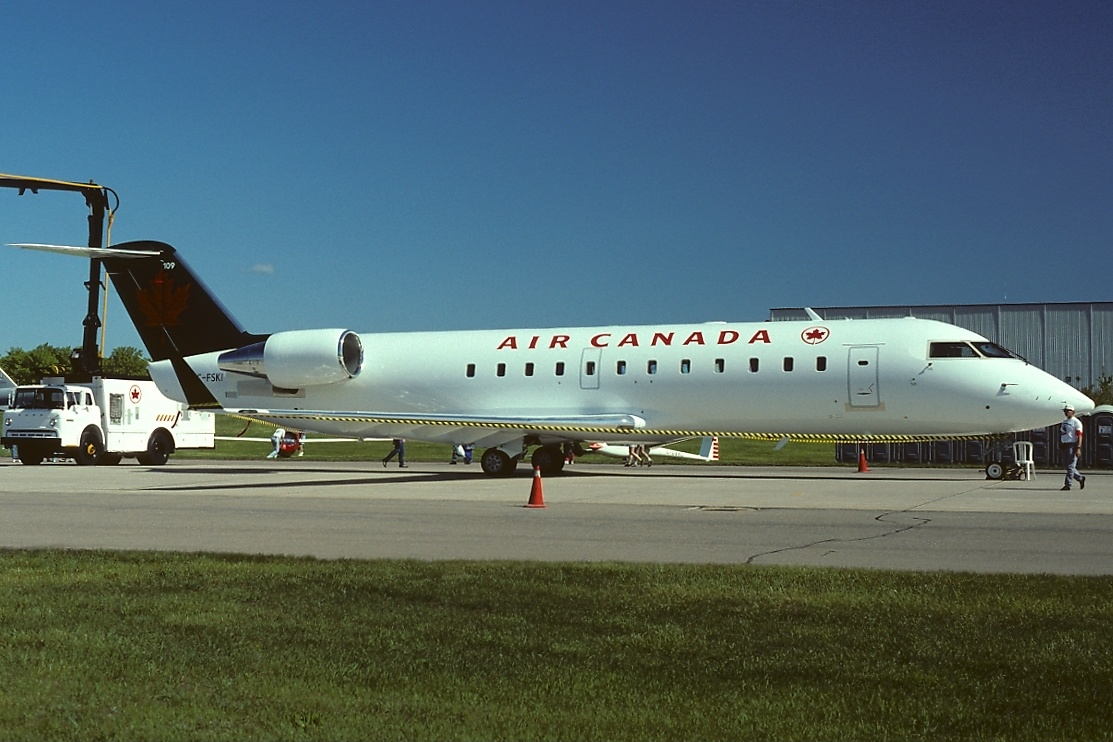
- C-FSKI, the aircraft involved, photographed in 1995.

Accident
- Date: December 16, 1997
- Summary: Stall during attempted low-energy go-around
- Site: Fredericton International Airport, Fredericton, New Brunswick, Canada

Aircraft
- Aircraft type: Bombardier CRJ100ER
- Operator: Air Canada
- IATA flight No.: AC676
- ICAO flight No.: ACA646
- Call sign: AIR CANADA 646
- Registration: C-FSKI
- Flight origin: Toronto Pearson International Airport, Toronto, Ontario
- Destination: Fredericton International Airport, Fredericton, New Brunswick
- Occupants: 42
- Passengers: 39
- Crew: 3
- Fatalities: 0
- Injuries: 35
- Survivors: 42

Air Canada Flight 646 was a scheduled domestic flight from Toronto's Lester B. Pearson International Airport to Fredericton, New Brunswick, operated by Air Canada. On December 16, 1997, at 23:48 local time, the Canadair CRJ100ER (CL-65) jet crashed after a failed go-around attempt in Fredericton. All passengers and crew survived, despite a 1-hour, 30-minute emergency response time and inadequate emergency training of the flight crew. The aircraft was damaged beyond repair and written off, making the accident the second hull loss of a CRJ100.

== Accident ==
The weather in Fredericton was difficult — reported weather gave 100 feet (30 m) of vertical visibility and 1/8 of a mile (200 m) of horizontal visibility. With the runway lights, the runway visibility was 1,200 feet (370 m) for landing on runway 15. At 200 feet (61 m) above ground level the captain approved the landing, and the first officer, who was the pilot flying, responded that he would land the plane. Once the first officer disengaged the autopilot, the aircraft drifted left of the centre line of the runway and above the proper glidepath, and, as the plane approached 80 feet (24 m) above ground level, the first officer reduced the engine thrust to idle speed. The captain, knowing the plane was off centre and unsure how much runway was left, ordered a go-around; the first officer had independently come to the same conclusion at about the same time.

Immediately, the first officer advanced the thrust levers, selected go-around mode for his flight director, and pulled back on his control column, and the aircraft began to pitch up. Almost immediately thereafter, the stick shaker activated. Although the first officer reduced the back pressure on his control column, the aircraft continued to pitch up, and soon went into a stall.

The aircraft banked sharply to the right until the wingtip contacted the runway, bending the wing upwards by four feet. Then the aircraft levelled off until the nose contacted the runway. This broke off the right winglet and the nose landing gear, destroyed the radome, and caused heavy damage to the underside of the aircraft. All electrical power except the emergency lighting was lost. By this time, the engines had reached full power, and the aircraft was rolling on its main gear, off the right side of the runway, through the snow, until it hit a ditch that ran parallel to the runway. This sent the plane airborne, where it flew about 1,000 feet (300 m), struck some trees, and finally came to rest. One large tree had entered the cabin through the main passenger door and cut a path in the fuselage through the first five rows of seats.

The flight attendant, during the crash sequence, shouted brace position commands and once the aircraft stopped, immediately evacuated the aircraft with the assistance of an off-duty flight attendant. Some passengers could not be extricated and required rescue from the Fire Services.

There was no fire on board the aircraft, no fatalities, and many on board were able to evacuate safely. A number of severely injured passengers had to be extracted from the aircraft with the "jaws of life" prior to receiving medical treatment.

== Rescue ==
The CRJ (CL-65) aircraft was not equipped with an emergency locator transmitter, nor was one required. This, combined with the snow, fog, and darkness, hampered rescue efforts as the first responders did not arrive until 90 minutes after the incident. Passengers and crew also had no means of signalling rescuers to reveal their location. They were unable to assist at least six individuals trapped inside the aircraft by the crash, until long after rescuers arrived. The flight crew did find pry bars; however they were not capable of doing anything with these which were a combination of tools in a short package. There was a long delay of almost 4 hours, in rescuing passengers, due to the fact that the jaws of life and a power saw were needed to extricate the passengers, and these had to be obtained from Camp Gagetown. There was also a delay due to the fact fire services expected the plane to catch fire, and were unable to make a safe entry. Eventually ambulance attendants made the first entry.

== Investigation ==
The Transportation Safety Board probe listed 29 causes and contributing factors and an additional 16 aggravating factors in the crash and rescue performance, including the following:

- Given the weather conditions, runway conditions, and first officer experience, the decision to allow the first officer to land the plane was questionable, though within policy.
- The wings had accumulated ice, degrading their performance, and reducing the maximum angle of attack before stall.
- The stick shaker worked as designed but the reduced wing performance reduced the warning time given by the stick shaker.
- A go-around without ground contact would not have been possible at the altitude it was ordered due to weather conditions and wing performance.
- The flight crew was not trained according to legal requirements in emergency procedures, including go-around, rescue and emergency exits.
- Stall-recovery training did not account for the weather conditions at the time of the crash.
- The published go-around procedure did not account for the time required for the engines spin up to sufficient thrust for go-around after idling.
