= Yoho Lake =

- Location within New Brunswick Location within Canada
- Location: New Brunswick
- Coordinates: 45°46′54″N 66°51′33″W
- Type: Lake
- Primary outflows: Yoho Stream
- Basin countries: Canada
- Surface area: 126 ha (310 acres)
- Average depth: 3.66 m (12.0 ft)
- Max. depth: 13.69 m (44.9 ft)
- Water volume: 7,071,457.9 m^{3} (249,726,180 cu ft)
- Settlements: Fredericton, New Brunswick

Yoho lake is a lake located in New Brunswick, Canada. It is near the capital, Fredericton, and to the village of Hanwell. It has an average depth of 3.66 m (12.0 ft), but a maximum depth of 13.69 m (44.9 ft) It has one major outlet, the Yoho Stream, which flows into the South Oromocto River.

== Wildlife ==
Fish found in the lake include: Yellow Perch, Landlocked Atlantic Salmon, Smallmouth bass, redbreast sunfish, of which it is the most northern source worldwide, and many others. It is known for having an abundance of Common Loons.

== Cyanobacteria outbreaks ==
In 2020, a blue-green algae bloom was discovered in the lake. It is unknown if any toxins were produced, but since then, two smaller ones had happened. The first 2020 one was also relatively small, compared to the effects in other lakes in the region.
