= Bailey, New Brunswick =

Community in canada

Coordinates: 45°38′N 66°35′W

Bailey (2001 pop.: approximately 98) is a Canadian rural community in Sunbury County, New Brunswick.

It has an elevation of 764 ft. The telephone area code for Bailey is 506.

== See also ==
- List of communities in New Brunswick
