= New Brunswick Route 645 =

Highway in New Brunswick, Canada

Coordinates: 45.686516°N 66.869316°W

Route 645

Route information
- Maintained by New Brunswick Department of Transportation
- Length: 26 km (16 mi)

Major junctions
- East end: Route 640 in Hurley Corner
- West end: Route 101 in Tracy

Location
- Country: Canada
- Province: New Brunswick

Highway system
- Provincial highways in New Brunswick; Former routes
← Route 640	→ Route 655

Route 645 is a 25.6-kilometre (15.9 mi) long mostly east–west secondary highway in the southwestern portion of New Brunswick, Canada. Most of the route is in New Maryland Parish.

The route starts at Route 640 in Hurley Corner where it travels south through Cork then travels east through Rooth. The route continues through Vespra where it runs parallel to the Oromocto River. From here, the road is known as Rooth Road. It then ends in Tracy at Route 101.
