= Oromocto =

Oromocto Welamukotuk (Great River)
- Town
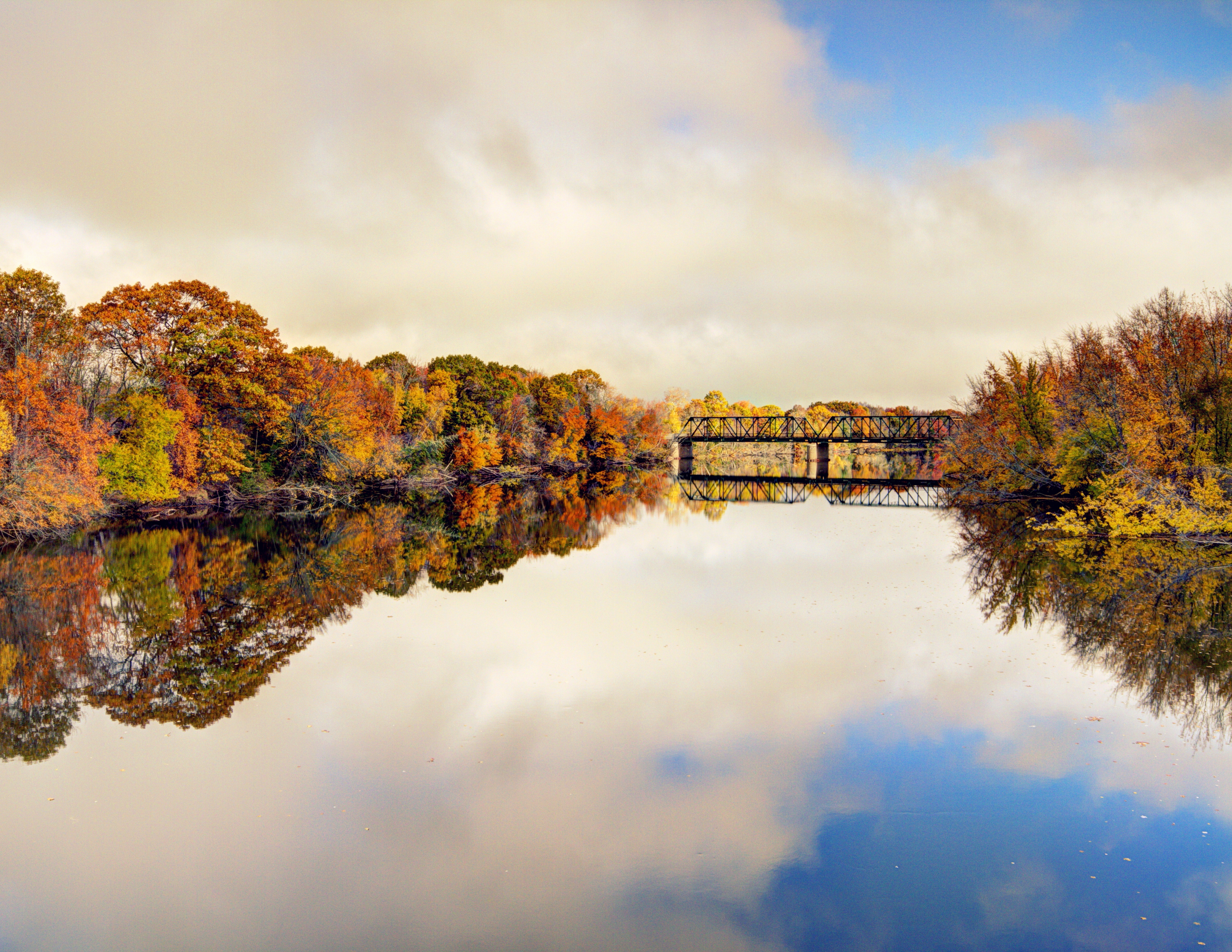
- The Oromocto River in 2012

- Flag Coat of arms Logo
- Nickname: Canada's Model town
- Motto: Latin: Succesus Per Operam "Effort Brings Success"
- Location within New Brunswick
- Coordinates: 45°50′56″N 66°28′44″W
- Country: Canada
- Province: New Brunswick
- County: Sunbury County
- Parish: Burton Parish
- Founded: March 16, 1943
- Incorporated: 1956
- Electoral districts Federal: Fredericton—Oromocto
- Provincial: Oromocto

Government
  - Type: Town council
  - Mayor: Bob Powell
  - Councillors: Ryan Carr, Dean Grattan, Jeff Kirkbride, Sheridan W. Mawhinney, Kelly Murdock, Joseph Myers, Gary M. von Richter, Brad Whalen

Area
  - Land: 22.36 km^{2} (8.63 sq mi)
- Highest elevation: 51 m (167 ft)
- Lowest elevation: 0 m (0 ft)

Population (2021)
  - Total: 9,045
  - Density: 404.5/km^{2} (1,048/sq mi)
  - Change (2016–21): ▼1.9%
  - Dwellings: 3,897
- Time zone: UTC−4 (AST)
  - Summer (DST): UTC−3 (ADT)
- Postal code(s): E2V 2V3
- Area code: 506
- Access routes Route 2 (TCH) Route 7: Route 102
- Telephone exchange: 357-440
- NTS Map: 021G16
- GNBC Code: DATWJ
- Website: oromocto.ca

Oromocto is a Canadian town in Sunbury County, New Brunswick.

The town is located on the west bank of the Saint John River at the mouth of the Oromocto River, approximately 20 kilometres (12 mi) southeast of Fredericton. The town's name is derived from the name of the Oromocto River; "oromocto" is thought to have originated from the Wolastoqey word welamukotuk which means "deep water". It appears on early maps as Ramouctou and La Rivière du Kamouctou (Freneuse seigneurial grant, 1684).

It is the administrative headquarters of the Oromocto First Nation band government and the site of Canadian Forces Base Gagetown, which dominates its economy and modern history.

On 1 January 2023, Oromocto annexed the local service district of the parish of Lincoln, excluding the Fredericton International Airport and a highway strip connecting it to the city. Revised census figures have not been released.

== History ==
The town was initially an Acadian village. During the Expulsion of the Acadians, it was burned in the St. John River Campaign (1758). During the American Revolution, Fort Hughes was built in the community after the rebellion at Maugerville, New Brunswick. (A replica of Fort Hughes was built at Sir Douglas Hazen Park.) In 1783, Oromocto saw a large influx of settlers with the arrival of United Empire Loyalists, with a steady stream of new blood arriving in the area. Many of the Loyalists also moved into surrounding areas, establishing smaller communities such as Lincoln and Geary.

Oromocto was originally a shipbuilding town in the 19th century, but went into decline after the industry closed. During its shipbuilding days, Oromocto produced about 22 ships. This was made possible by an abundance of timber and sawmills, which continued to provide economic stability to Oromocto, even after the shipbuilding business had died out. It remained a small hamlet until it was selected as the headquarters for a large military training area, in the early 1950s. The Gagetown Military Camp (Camp Gagetown) opened in 1955 as the largest military reservation in the Commonwealth of Nations at the time.

Oromocto underwent a transformation during this time as it was designed to be a "model town". It was considered to be at the forefront of such efforts in Canada. Today, Oromocto's entire economy is dominated by CFB Gagetown.

Oromocto, NB Historical populations
Year	Pop.	±% p.a.
1871	400	—
1956	661	+0.59%
1961	12,170	+79.07%
1971	11,427	−0.63%
1981	9,064	−2.29%
1991	9,325	+0.28%
2001	8,843	−0.53%
2006	8,402	−1.02%
2011	8,932	+1.23%
2016	9,223	+0.64%
2021	9,045	−0.39%

The town's location in the Saint John River valley provides lush vegetation and an attractive waterfront on both rivers. A small park and marina occupy an area on the Oromocto River waterfront near the downtown. A business district in the area of Restigouche Road has become moderately successful, and the town features a small hospital, track and field facilities, and churches. The town is home to a distribution centre for Sobeys grocery stores, a funeral home, library and recreation centre. Where the town borders on CFB Gagetown, there is also a Canex with a salon and barbershop, hockey/squash arenas, swimming pool, and a credit union, along with military vehicles and aircraft on outdoor display.

Adjacent to the town on the eastern limits is the Oromocto First Nations reserve, a small Wolastoqey community.

Canadian National Railway abandoned its railway line, which ran through the town to CFB Gagetown, in March 1996. This railway right-of-way has been developed as a recreational trail and is part of the "Sentier NB Trail" network. The section of the Sentier NB Trail between Fredericton-Oromocto-Burton also hosts the Trans Canada Trail.

== Demographics ==
In the 2021 Census of Population conducted by Statistics Canada, Oromocto had a population of 9,045 living in 3,663 of its 3,897 total private dwellings, a change of −1.9% from its 2016 population of 9,223. With a land area of 22.36 km^{2} (8.63 sq mi), it had a population density of 404.5/km^{2} (1,047.7/sq mi) in 2021.

== Education ==
There are two school districts in Oromocto, one providing education in English and one in French, and eight public schools.

- Anglophone West School District:
  - Assiniboine Avenue Elementary School
  - Gesner Street Elementary School
  - Hubbard Avenue Elementary School
  - Summerhill Street Elementary School
  - Harold Peterson Middle School
  - Ridgeview Middle School
  - Oromocto High School
- District scolaire francophone Sud:
  - École Arc-En-Ciel serves Francophone students from K- Gr. 8 in Oromocto
  - École Sainte-Anne, in Fredericton, serves Francophone high-school students from Oromocto.

== See also ==
- List of communities in New Brunswick
- Oromocto (ship)
