= Fredericton International Airport =

International airport serving Fredericton, New Brunswick, Canada

Fredericton International Airport Aéroport international de Fredericton
- IATA: YFC; ICAO: CYFC; WMO: 71700

Summary
- Airport type: Public
- Owner: Transport Canada
- Operator: Fredericton International Airport Authority
- Serves: Fredericton; Oromocto, New Brunswick
- Location: Lincoln, New Brunswick
- Time zone: AST (UTC−04:00)
  - Summer (DST): ADT (UTC−03:00)
- Elevation AMSL: 67 ft (20 m)
- Coordinates: 45°52′08″N 066°32′14″W
- Website: https://yfcfredericton.ca/

Map
- Location within New Brunswick Location within Canada

Runways
Direction	Length		Surface
Direction	ft	m	Surface
15/33	7,000	2,134	Asphalt
09/27	8,005	2,440	Asphalt

Helipads
Number	Length		Surface
Number	ft	m	Surface
Parking Pad	60 (dia)	18 (dia)	Asphalt

Statistics (2024)
- Total passengers: 377,346
- Source: Canada Flight Supplement; Environment Canada; Movements from Statistics Canada; Passengers from Fredericton International Airport

Fredericton International Airport (IATA: YFC, ICAO: CYFC) is an airport in Lincoln, New Brunswick, Canada, 7 nautical miles (13 km; 8.1 mi) southeast of Fredericton.

The airport is classified as an international airport by Transport Canada and is staffed by the Canada Border Services Agency (CBSA). CBSA officers at this airport can handle aircraft with no more than 55 passengers or 140 if offloaded in stages.

Part of the National Airports System, the airport is owned by Transport Canada and operated by the Fredericton International Airport Authority.

The airport has two runways and is the second-busiest airport in New Brunswick in terms of passenger levels, after the Greater Moncton International Airport. In 2016 the airport handled 377,977 passengers and in 2008 the airport went from 34,078 aircraft movements to 73,330, an increase of 115%, prompting Nav Canada to provide a control tower in 2009/2010. In 2009 the airport saw the number of movements rise by 44.8% to 106,178, making it the 19th-busiest in Canada and the only one in the top twenty without air traffic control during the year.

Fredericton was designated an international airport in 2007 by Transport Canada.

The airport spent $30 million to expand the terminal size by 50% to improve energy efficiency, add more ticket counters, washroom and seating. The expansion began in mid summer of 2018 and construction lasted 30 months.

== Airlines and destinations ==
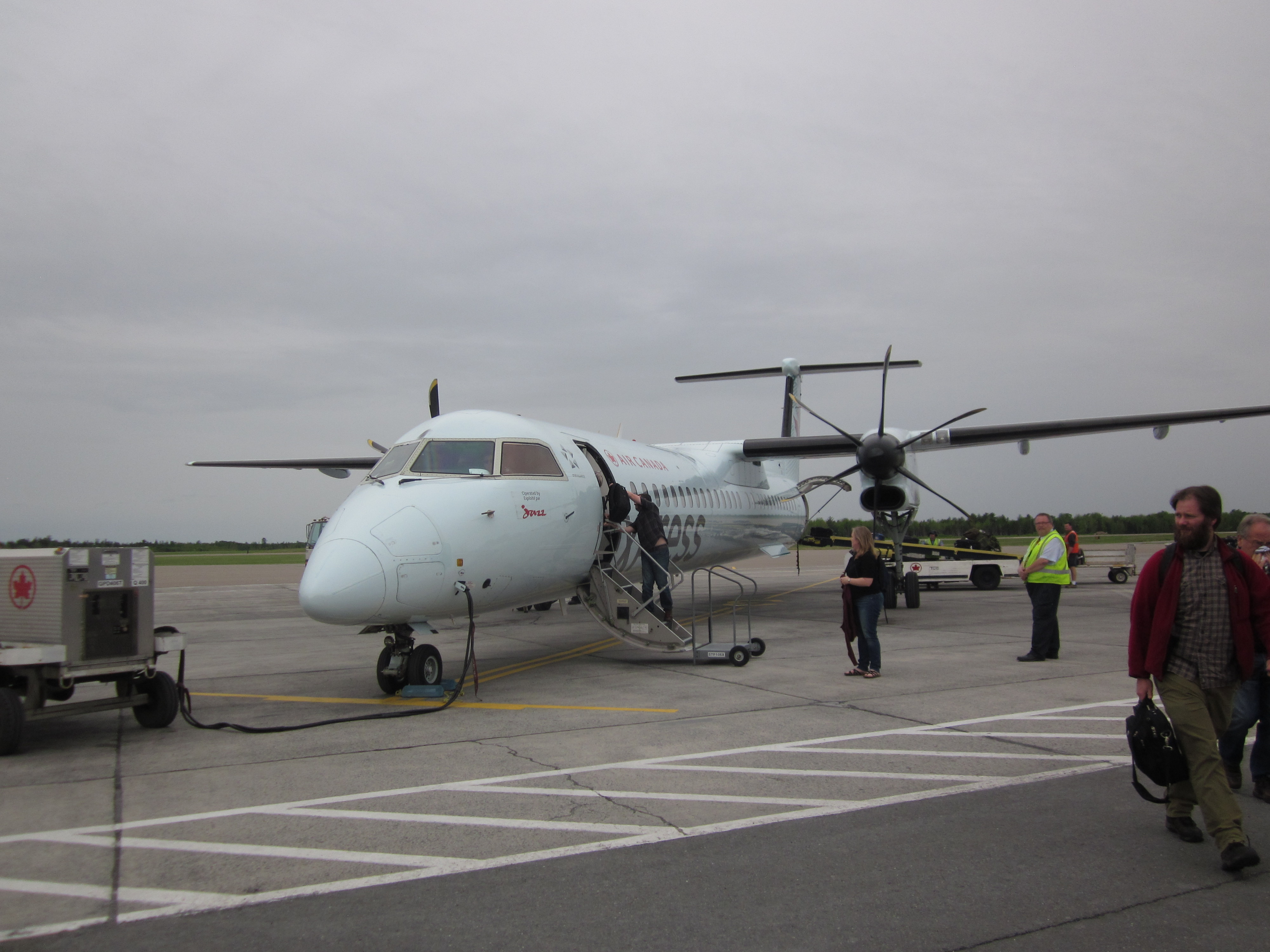
Air Canada Express Dash 8 Q400 arriving from Toronto-Pearson

Airlines	Destinations
Air Canada	Toronto–Pearson
Air Canada Express	Montréal–Trudeau, Ottawa
Air Canada Rouge	Toronto–Pearson
Air Transat	Seasonal: Cancún
Porter Airlines	Ottawa, Toronto–Billy Bishop
WestJet	Seasonal: Calgary

== Statistics ==
=== Annual traffic ===
Annual passenger traffic
Year	Passengers	% change
2010	273,968	Steady
2011	279,447	▲2%
2012	283,760	▲1.5%
2013	298,760	▲5.5%
2014	316,888	▲6.1%
2015	349,832	▲10.4%
2016	377,977	▲8.1%
2017	398,000	▲5.3%
2018	424,324	▲7.8%
2019	427,085	▲0.65%
2020	103,667	▼75.63%
2021	100,844	▼2.72%
2022	267,050	▲164.81%
2023	333,813	▲25.00%
2024	377,346	▲13.04%

== Facilities ==
Built in 1963, the current airport terminal consists of a five storey control tower flanked by a single storey departure and arrival wings. Additions were completed from 2004 to 2006 and 2009, with a large terminal expansion and renovation, being completed in 2021.

The airport has its own fire suppression (two ARFF and tanker) to handle aircraft-related emergency calls. Mutual assistance provided by Fredericton, Oromocto and CFB Gagetown.

== Accidents and incidents ==
Air Canada Flight 646 crashed here in 1997. The plane, a Bombardier CJ series, crash landed and hit a tree. There were no fatalities.
