= Rusagonis-Waasis =

Former local service district in New Brunswick, Canada

Coordinates: 45°48′1.7″N 66°37′33.6″W

Rusagonis-Waasis (2001 population: 748) was a Canadian local service district in Lincoln Parish, Sunbury County, New Brunswick, which bore the name of two communities within the local service district, Rusagonis and Waasis. Early references use an alternative spelling, Rusagornis, for the community today known as Rusagonis. Some residents advocated changing the governing structure from a local service district into a rural community. It is now mainly part of the incorporated rural community of Sunbury-York South, with the remainder belonging to the city of Fredericton and the Capital region rural district.

It is located 15 kilometres southeast of Fredericton, and is near Tracy. It is west-southwest of Oromocto. It formerly had at least two railway stations (flag stops) served by the Canadian Pacific Railway. It is pronounced Rushagornish or more commonly known as "The Gornish"

== Demographics ==
In the 2021 Census of Population conducted by Statistics Canada, Rusagonis-Waasis had a population of 4,661 living in 1,832 of its 1,862 total private dwellings, a change of 9.6% from its 2016 population of 4,252. With a land area of 132.2 km^{2} (51.0 sq mi), it had a population density of 35.3/km^{2} (91.3/sq mi) in 2021.

== Descriptions by Provincial Archives of New Brunswick ==
The Provincial Archives of New Brunswick describes some historical communities within the local service district:

=== Rusagonis ===
"Located 11.74 km WSW of Oromocto: Lincoln Parish, Sunbury County (pronounced "roo-sha-gor-nish"): William Francis Ganong identified the Wolastoqey name for Rusagonis as Tesegwan'ik: settled in 1784: PO Rusagornis 1853-1930: in 1866 Rusagornis was a farming community with approximately 52 families: in 1871 Rusagornis and surrounding district had a population of about 200: in 1904 Rusagornis had 1 post office, 1 store, 1 church and a population of 75: PO Rusagonis 1930–1959."

=== Rusagonis Station ===
"Located 12.09 km SW of Oromocto: Lincoln Parish, Sunbury County: PO Rusagornis Station 1871-1880 and 1885-1930: in 1898 it was a flag station on the Fredericton branch of the Canadian Pacific Railway and a settlement with 1 post office, 1 grist mill, 1 church and a population of 50: PO Rusagonis Station 1930-1970.

=== Waasis ===
"Located 7.97 km WSW of Oromocto and 10.98 km WSW of Maugerville: Lincoln Parish, Sunbury County: William Francis Ganong identified the Wolastoqey name for Waasis as Tesegwaniksis or "Little Rusagonis": PO Waasis Station 1870-1917: in 1871 it had a population of 125: in 1898 Waasis was a flag station for the Canadian Pacific Railway and a settlement with a population of 100."

== See also ==
- List of communities in New Brunswick
