= Tracy, New Brunswick =

Tracy
- Village
- Location of Tracy Tracy (Canada)
- Coordinates: 45°40′N 66°40′W
- Country: Canada
- Province: New Brunswick
- County: Sunbury
- Parish: Gladstone

Government
  - Mayor: Dale W. Mowry

Area
  - Land: 29.44 km^{2} (11.37 sq mi)

Population (2021)
  - Total: 610
  - Density: 20.7/km^{2} (54/sq mi)
  - Change (2016–21): ▲0.3%
- Time zone: UTC−04:00 (AST)
  - Summer (DST): UTC−03:00 (ADT)
- Area code: 506

Tracy is a Canadian village in Sunbury County, New Brunswick at Route 101 and the eastern terminus of Route 645.

The village is situated on the North Oromocto River, approximately 40 km south of Fredericton.

== Demographics ==
In the 2021 Census of Population conducted by Statistics Canada, Tracy had a population of 610 living in 251 of its 258 total private dwellings, a change of 0.3% from its 2016 population of 608. With a land area of 29.44 km^{2} (11.37 sq mi), it had a population density of 20.7/km^{2} (53.7/sq mi) in 2021.

== See also ==
- List of communities in New Brunswick
