= Hoyt, New Brunswick =

Coordinates: 45.586361°N 66.553139°W

Location of Hoyt in New Brunswick

Hoyt is a community in the Canadian province of New Brunswick, with a long history dating from the 1800s.

== History ==
The hamlet of Hoyt, New Brunswick is located in Blissville Parish, Sunbury County. It is named for William Hoyt, who was an early settler in the town in approximately the 1870s.

In 1898 Hoyt Station was a station on the Canadian Pacific Railway and a community with 1 post office, 1 store, 1 grist mill, 1 church and a population of 75 people. This included the community of Boyne, located three kilometres South of Hoyt.

In 2018 the Hoyt's covered bridge Bell Bridge experienced severe ice and flooding damage during a storm. It was one of three covered bridges in Hoyt.

== See also ==
- List of communities in New Brunswick
