= Fredericton Junction =

- Village
- Location of Fredericton Junction Fredericton Junction (Canada)
- Coordinates: 45°39′N 66°36′W
- Country: Canada
- Province: New Brunswick
- County: Sunbury
- Parish: Gladstone
- Village status: 1966

Government
  - Type: Village council
  - Mayor: R. Len Falconer

Area
  - Total: 23.85 km^{2} (9.21 sq mi)

Population (2021)
  - Total: 719
  - Density: 30.1/km^{2} (78/sq mi)
  - Change 2016–21: ▲2.1%
- Time zone: UTC−04:00 (AST)
  - Summer (DST): UTC−03:00 (ADT)
- Area code: 506
- Dwellings: 304
- Median income*: $57,600 CDN
- Access routes: Route 101
- Median household total income, 2015 (all households)

Fredericton Junction (2016 population: 704) is a Canadian village in Sunbury County, New Brunswick.

Located on the North Branch of the Oromocto River in the western part of the county, the village is approximately 45 km (28 mi) southwest of Fredericton.

== History ==
The community was originally named Hartt's Mills but was renamed in 1869 when the European and North American Railway (Western Extension) was opened between Saint John and Vanceboro, Maine, meeting the Fredericton Branch Railway which ran from this junction into Fredericton.

== Demographics ==
In the 2021 Census of Population conducted by Statistics Canada, Fredericton Junction had a population of 719 living in 292 of its 304 total private dwellings, a change of 2.1% from its 2016 population of 704. With a land area of 23.85 km^{2} (9.21 sq mi), it had a population density of 30.1/km^{2} (78.1/sq mi) in 2021.

Historical Census Data Fredericton Junction, NB
Year	Pop.	±%
2006	715	—
2011	752	+5.2%
2016	704	−6.4%
2021	719	+2.1%

== See also ==
- List of communities in New Brunswick
