= Waterville, Sunbury County, New Brunswick =

Community in Sunbury County, New Brunswick, Canada

Waterville
- Rural community
- Interactive map of Waterville
- Coordinates: 45°47′21″N 66°31′45″W
- Country: Canada
- Province: New Brunswick
- County: Sunbury
- Time zone: UTC-4 (Atlantic Standard Time)
  - Summer (DST): UTC-3 (Atlantic Daylight Time)
- Area code: 506

Waterville is a Canadian rural community in Sunbury County, New Brunswick.

== See also ==
- List of communities in New Brunswick
