= Lincoln, New Brunswick =

Coordinates: 45.9053°N 66.57938°W

Location of Lincoln in New Brunswick

Lincoln (2011 pop.: 6,458) is a Canadian suburban community in Sunbury County, New Brunswick.

== Geography ==
Located on the west bank of the Saint John River between Fredericton and Oromocto, Lincoln was one of the original United Empire Loyalist settlements established in the province following the American Revolution.

== History ==
Lincoln was one of the original United Empire Loyalist settlements established in the province following the American Revolution.

Belmont House is a historic building located on New Brunswick Route 102 in Lincoln. The house, built in 1820, was originally built as the home of John Murray Bliss, "the son of a Loyalist settler who became a" justice of the New Brunswick Supreme Court. In 1839, the property was bought by the Wilmot family, a family of Loyalist settlers. Robert Duncan Wilmot, the son of the settler who bought the property, was a Father of Confederation and served as Senator from New Brunswick, and Lieutenant-Governor of New Brunswick from 1880-1885. Robert Duncan Wilmot died at the Belmont House in 1891.

When the Loyalists moved from the newly independent colonies to British North America, Captain Benjamin Glazier moved in March 1776 to this area and named it Lincoln, as that is where he came from in Massachusetts. Then Upper and Lower Lincoln were created. Then on 18 May 1785 was proclaimed as the Official Birthday of Lincoln. The latter, Upper Lincoln became part of the City of Fredericton, but Lower Lincoln is now only Lincoln and is a Local Service District. A Local Service District (L.S.D.), elects an Advisory committee and advises the Min of Municipal Affairs of what the Citizens would like to have as far as Bylaws and Codes are concerned. As Lincoln has a big Tax Base, due to the Airport, etc.

Although Lincoln is in between the City of Fredericton and the Town of Oromocto, it is easily accessible via the Trans Canada Highway, which forms the boundary on the south. For years Lincoln was just a small 1 street community, but in the 1950s Nevers road was upgraded from a dirt road, and houses started to appear. On February 1, 1952, The Fredericton Municipal Airport was officially opened on Lincoln Road. Scott's Nurseries in Lincoln also dates as far back as May 1954. Sometime before 1930, the Lower Lincoln School was built and in 1955 it underwent renovations. "Lower Lincoln School Will Be Ready By Fall," Daily Gleaner, August 10, 1955. In June 2012, construction began on a new elementary school in Lincoln. The Lincoln Elementary Community School opened in September, 2013. "New Lincoln school almost ready," Daily Gleaner, May 17, 2013, p. 4.

== Demographics ==
In the 2021 Census of Population conducted by Statistics Canada, Lincoln had a population of 2,441 living in 1,073 of its 1,106 total private dwellings, a change of −2.5% from its 2016 population of 2,504. With a land area of 25.54 km^{2} (9.86 sq mi), it had a population density of 95.6/km^{2} (247.5/sq mi) in 2021.

== Notable people ==
- Robert Duncan Wilmot, Father of Confederation.
- John Murray Bliss, Justice of the Supreme Court of New Brunswick

== See also ==
- List of communities in New Brunswick
