= Oromocto River =

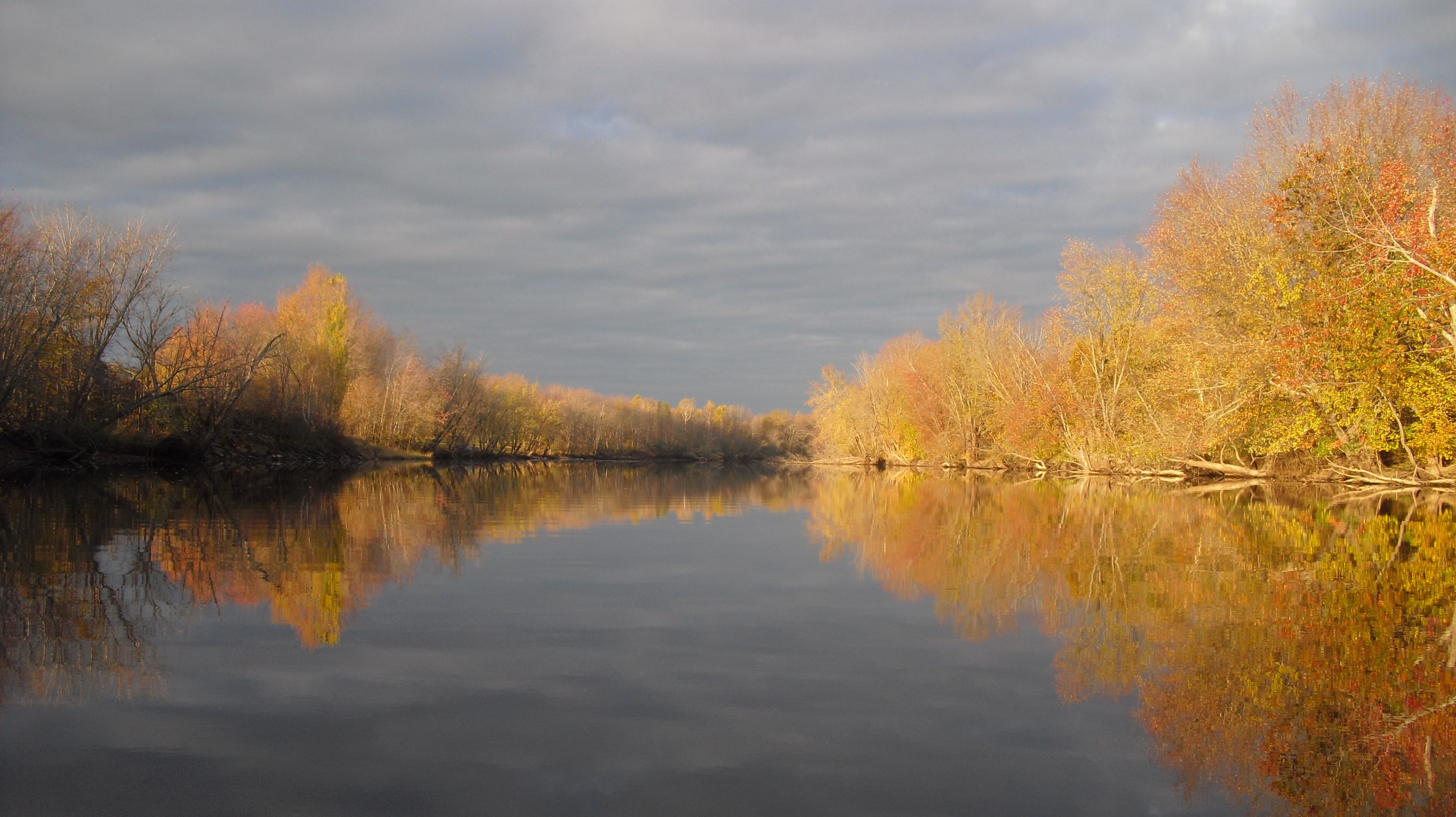
- Autumn sunrise on the Oromocto River near Oromocto

Location
- Country: Canada
- Province: New Brunswick

Physical characteristics
- Mouth: Saint John River
  - location: New Brunswick
  - coordinates: 45.8551°N 66.4781°W

The Oromocto River is a tributary of the Saint John River in southwest New Brunswick, Canada.

The Oromocto River is formed by the combination of the North and South Branches near Fredericton Junction, and flows north-northeast for 42 kilometres (26 mi) to its mouth at the Saint John River in the town of Oromocto.

North Branch Oromocto River, 45 kilometres (28 mi) in length, flows east-northeast from Oromocto Lake (near Harvey Station), passing through the villages of Tracy and follows sections of Route 645 and Route 101 to Fredericton Junction.

South Branch Oromocto River, 39 kilometres (24 mi) long, flows north-northeast from South Oromocto Lake, mostly through forest land to the head of the Oromocto River.

== See also ==
- List of bodies of water of New Brunswick
