= Grand Lake, New Brunswick =

Grand Lake
- Village
- Municipality of Grand Lake
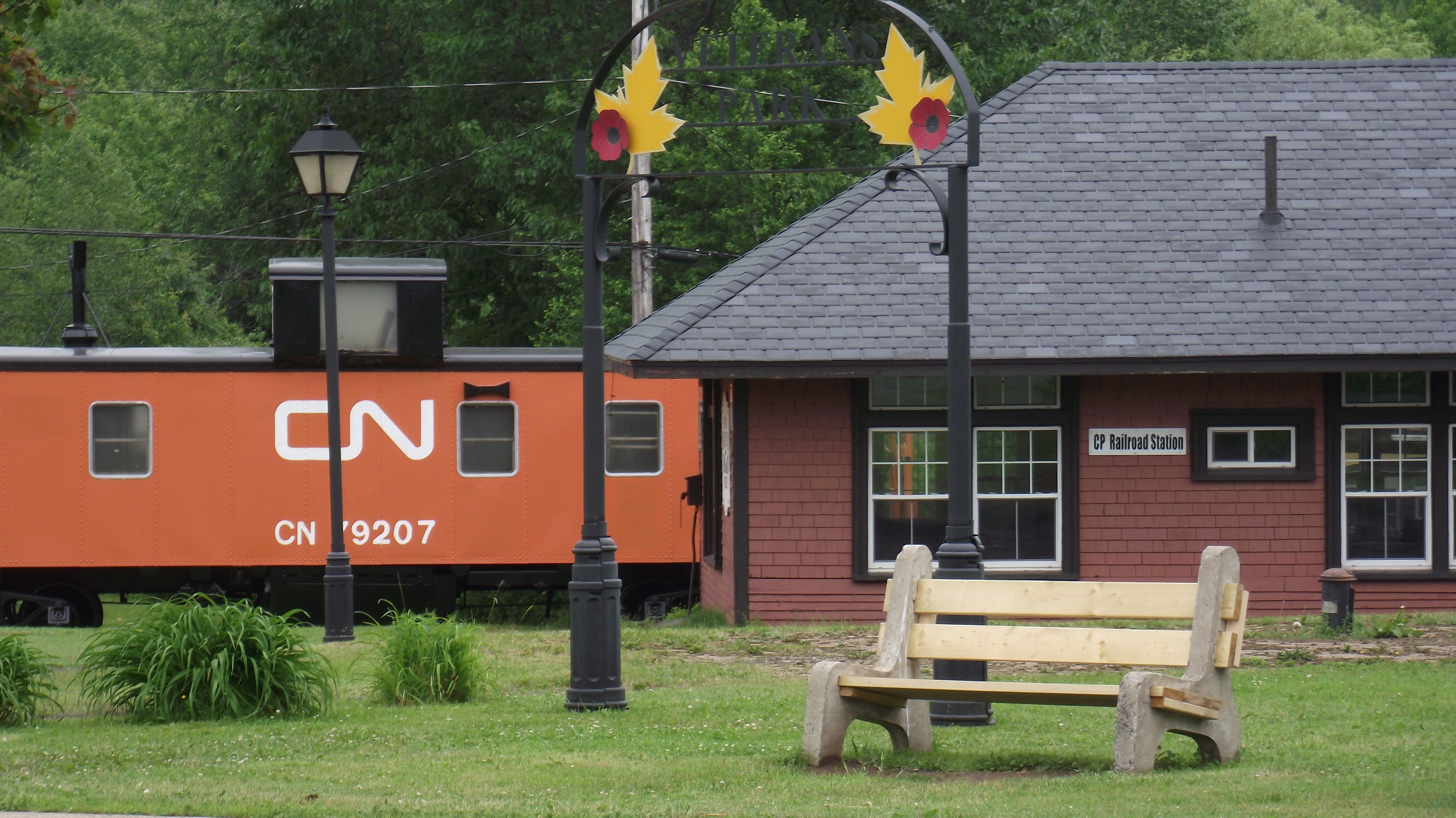
- Minto Museum and Veterans Park 2013, Grand Lake, New Brunswick

- Location within New Brunswick Grand Lake (Canada)
- Coordinates: 46°10′N 65°58′W
- Country: Canada
- Province: New Brunswick
- County: Queens
- Regional service commission: Capital Region
- Incorporated: January 1, 2023

Government
  - Type: Village council
  - Mayor: Peter Dufour
- Time zone: UTC-4 (AST)
  - Summer (DST): UTC-3 (ADT)
- Area code: 506

Grand Lake (long form Municipality of Grand Lake) is an incorporated village straddling the boundary of Sunbury County and Queens County, New Brunswick, Canada. It was formed through the 2023 New Brunswick local governance reforms by amalgamating the villages of Chipman and Minto, and certain previously unincorporated areas of Northfield Parish, Canning Parish, Sheffield Parish, and Harcourt Parish, contiguous to the area. The municipality is divided into four wards.

== History ==
Grand Lake was incorporated on January 1, 2023 via the amalgamation of the former villages of Minto and Chipman as well as the concurrent annexation of adjacent unincorporated areas.

== Coal Mining Industry ==
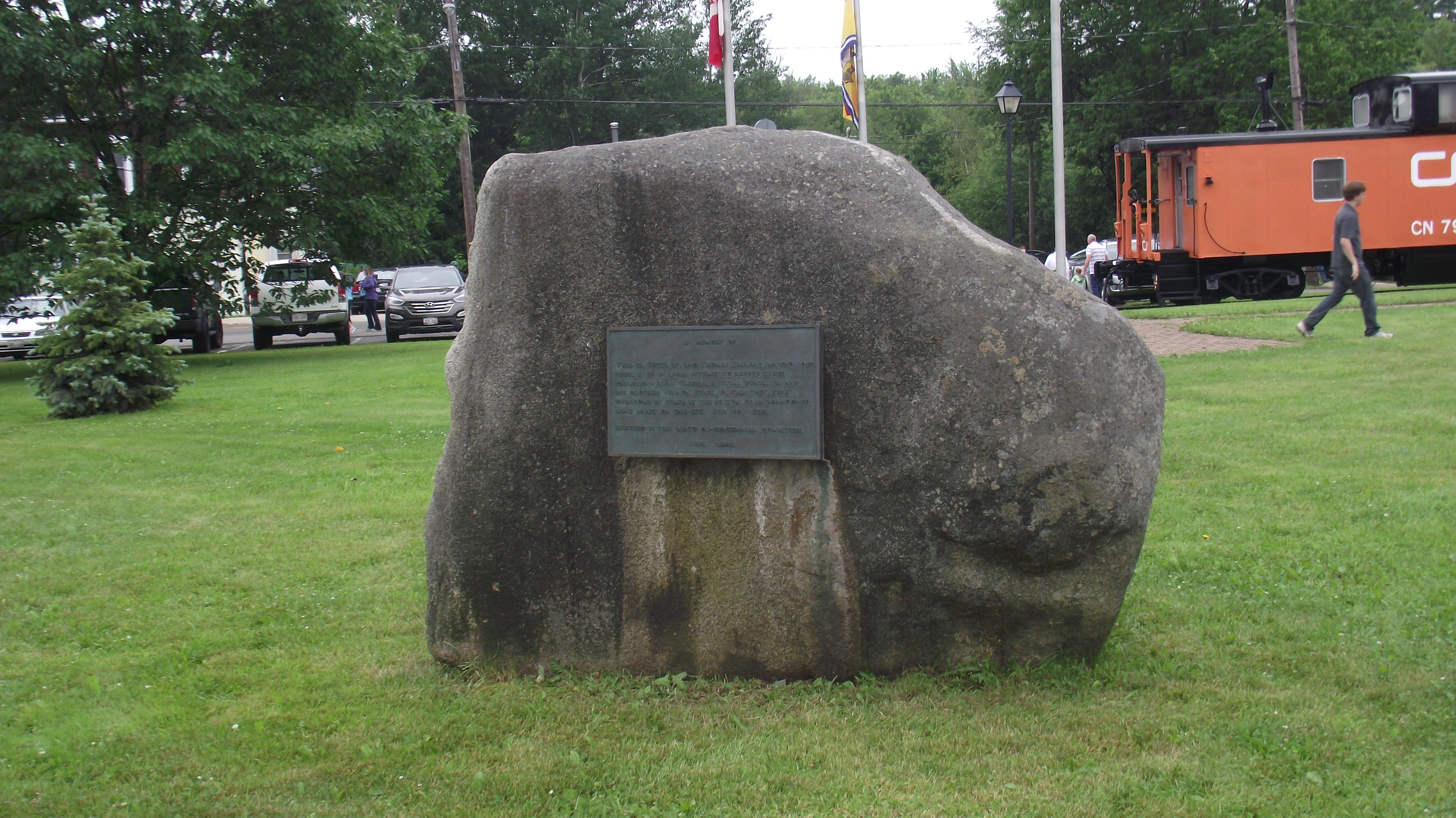
The memorial stone of five who died in an abandoned mine shaft in 1932, Grand Lake, New Brunswick, Canada.

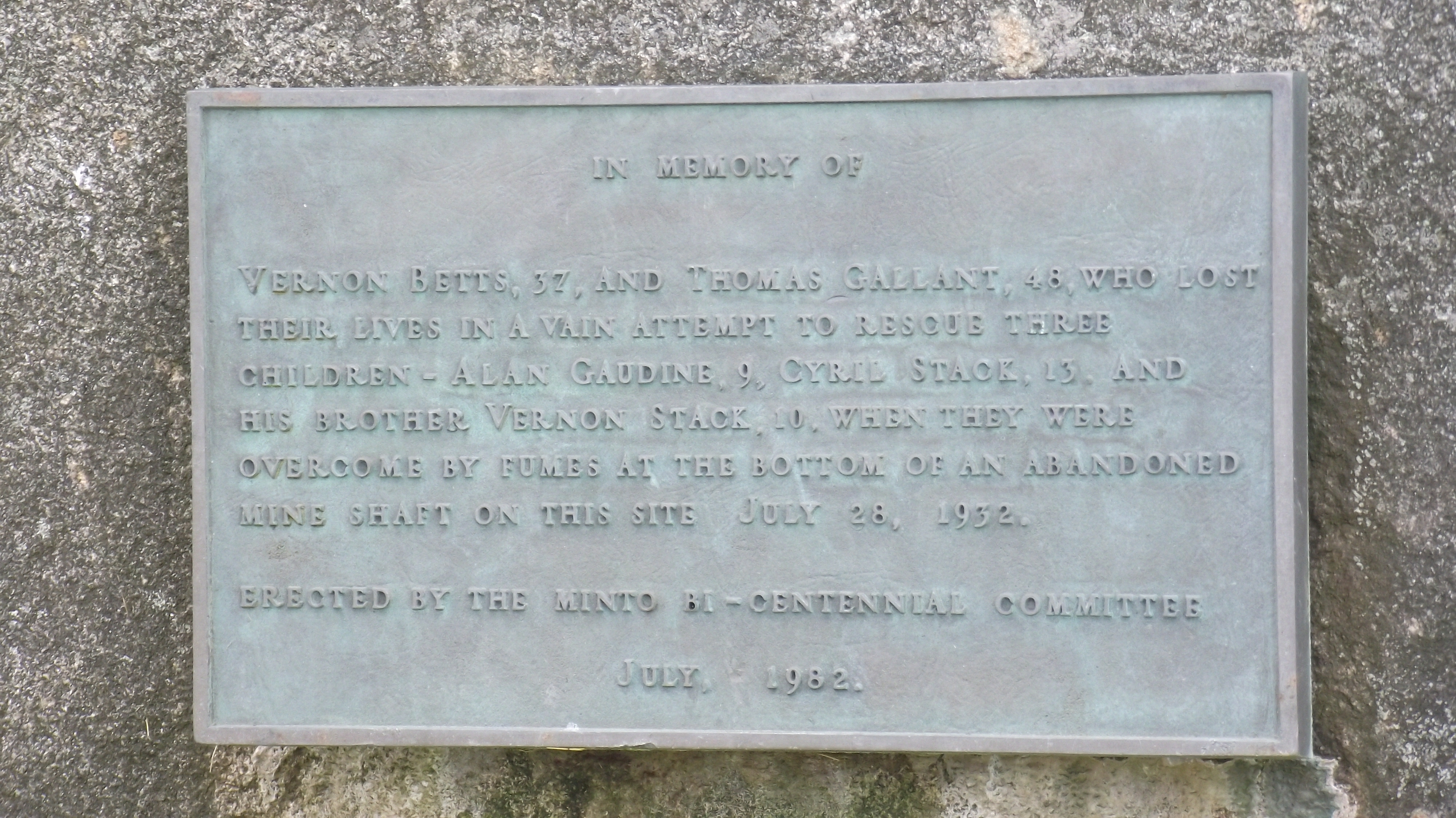
The inscription (1982) on the Minto Memorial Stone.

The Grand Lake coal mining industry originated in the 1630s, when Acadian settlers discovered surface coal deposits in the Coal Creek area, now part of Chipman, New Brunswick. They used the coal to supply their fort at the mouth of the Saint John River and, beginning in 1639, exported it to the British colony located in present-day Boston, Massachusetts. This trade is recognized by the Historic Sites and Monuments Board of Parks Canada as both a National Historic Event and the first recorded export of coal in the Americas. The demand for coal transportation later prompted the construction of a railway to Grand Lake, which was meant to make the area "the most prosperous place in Canada." The New Brunswick Central Railway opened a railroad from Saint John to Chipman in 1889, and in 1904 the railroad was extended to Minto. The rails were extended to Fredericton in 1913,

Although the railroad lines through Minto have since been removed, the railroad station continues on as a local museum/gift & flowers shop. By the end of 2010, coal mining in Minto ended when the last coal mining company, NB Coal Ltd, closed.

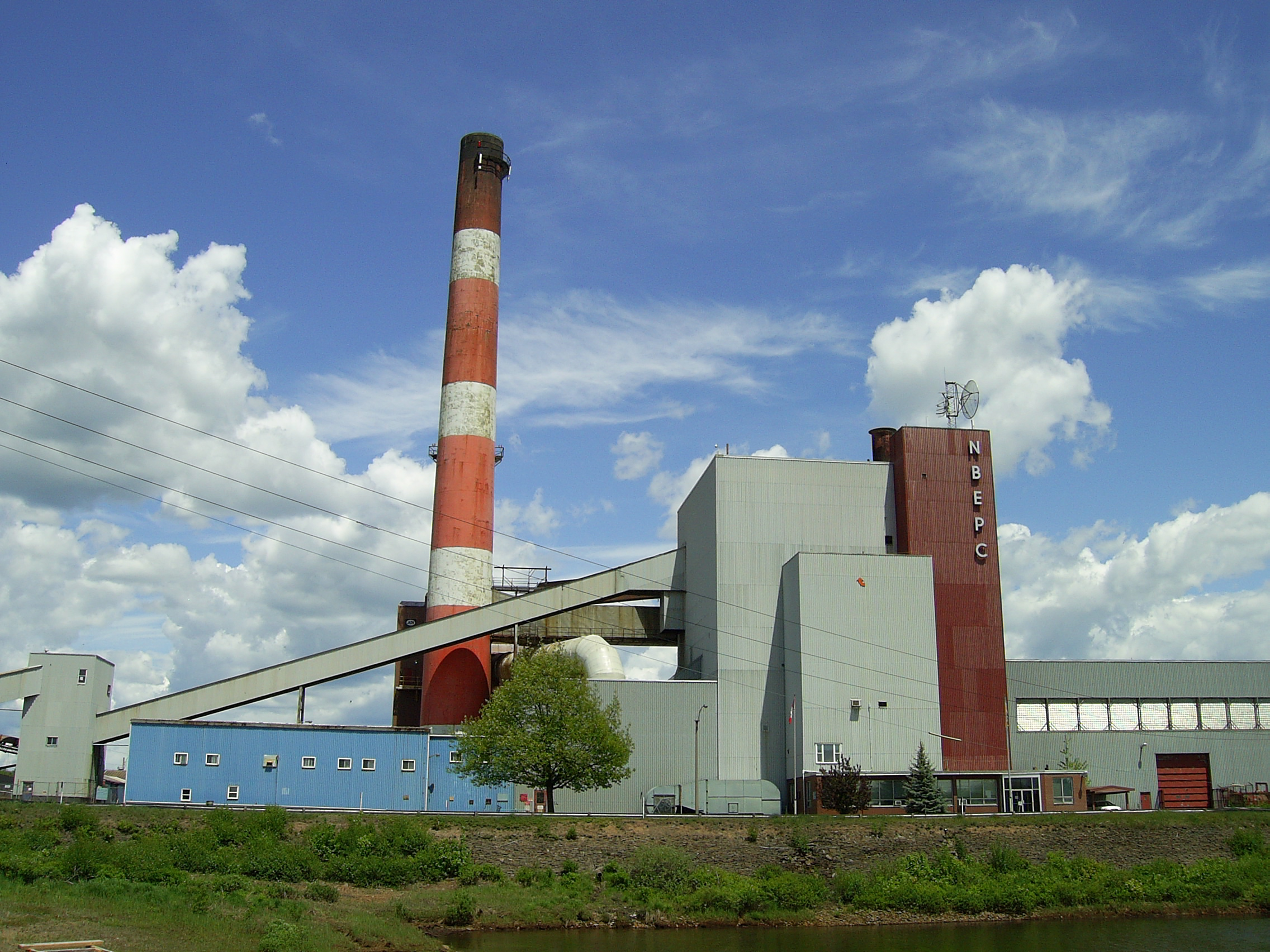
The Grand Lake Generating Station as seen in May 2010.

During the early years of the Great Depression, the New Brunswick Electric Power Commission built the province's first thermal generating station at Newcastle Creek on the shores of Grand Lake. Opened in 1931, the Grand Lake Generating Station accessed coal from nearby deposits. NB Power closed the Grand Lake Station when its operating license expired in June 2010. As the Station has been NB Coal’s only customer since 2000, NB Coal closed in December 2009. On April 19, 2012 the Grand Lake Generating Station was demolished, and by this time all coal mining in New Brunswick had ended.

== World War II internment camp ==
During the Second World War, the largest internment camp in eastern Canada was located in the hamlet of Ripples, 10 km west of the village of Minto. Originally it was home to German and Austrian Jews, both orthodox and non-observant, as well as to other refugees, all of whom had fled the Nazis to England. Some prisoners later became notable, including theologian Gregory Baum, chemist Ernest Eliel and physicist Walter Kohn. Later, after these refugees had been released into Canadian life, it became a camp mostly for German and Italian prisoners of war, as well as some sympathizers such as Canadian fascist Adrien Arcand. Its most notable prisoner at this time was the anti-conscriptionist mayor of Montreal, Camillien Houde.

This internment camp is now a protected site visited by tourists. The only structure remaining at the site is the base of a water-tower where a plaque stands, visible from the highway. A walking trail leads into the forest where a few ruins of the camp and posted signs describing the area may be found. There is a small museum dedicated to the camp located within Minto's municipal building.

== Climate ==
Climate data for Grand Lake
Month	Jan	Feb	Mar	Apr	May	Jun	Jul	Aug	Sep	Oct	Nov	Dec	Year
Record high °C (°F)	13.9 (57.0)	15.6 (60.1)	18.0 (64.4)	29.0 (84.2)	35.0 (95.0)	35.0 (95.0)	35.6 (96.1)	35.0 (95.0)	34.4 (93.9)	27.8 (82.0)	23.3 (73.9)	15.0 (59.0)	35.6 (96.1)
Mean daily maximum °C (°F)	−3.3 (26.1)	−2.2 (28.0)	3.0 (37.4)	9.1 (48.4)	16.5 (61.7)	22.3 (72.1)	25.2 (77.4)	24.3 (75.7)	19.3 (66.7)	13.0 (55.4)	6.3 (43.3)	−1.1 (30.0)	11.0 (51.8)
Daily mean °C (°F)	−8.9 (16.0)	−8.1 (17.4)	−2.4 (27.7)	4.1 (39.4)	10.7 (51.3)	16.4 (61.5)	19.6 (67.3)	18.7 (65.7)	13.8 (56.8)	8.1 (46.6)	2.3 (36.1)	−5.7 (21.7)	5.7 (42.3)
Mean daily minimum °C (°F)	−14.6 (5.7)	−14.2 (6.4)	−7.9 (17.8)	−1.1 (30.0)	4.8 (40.6)	10.3 (50.5)	14.0 (57.2)	13.1 (55.6)	8.3 (46.9)	3.2 (37.8)	−1.7 (28.9)	−10.8 (12.6)	0.3 (32.5)
Record low °C (°F)	−40.0 (−40.0)	−39.4 (−38.9)	−31.0 (−23.8)	−17.0 (1.4)	−5.0 (23.0)	−3.5 (25.7)	3.3 (37.9)	2.5 (36.5)	−2.5 (27.5)	−10.0 (14.0)	−18.5 (−1.3)	−33.3 (−27.9)	−40.0 (−40.0)
Average precipitation mm (inches)	82.0 (3.23)	72.7 (2.86)	69.4 (2.73)	72.9 (2.87)	85.8 (3.38)	80.0 (3.15)	83.7 (3.30)	81.6 (3.21)	87.0 (3.43)	90.5 (3.56)	97.6 (3.84)	108.4 (4.27)	1,011.5 (39.82)
Average rainfall mm (inches)	27.6 (1.09)	26.2 (1.03)	34.7 (1.37)	56.5 (2.22)	85.4 (3.36)	80.0 (3.15)	83.7 (3.30)	81.6 (3.21)	87.0 (3.43)	90.3 (3.56)	85.0 (3.35)	51.3 (2.02)	789.3 (31.07)
Average snowfall cm (inches)	52.1 (20.5)	45.4 (17.9)	34.9 (13.7)	16.6 (6.5)	0.5 (0.2)	0.0 (0.0)	0.0 (0.0)	0.0 (0.0)	0.0 (0.0)	0.6 (0.2)	12.0 (4.7)	55.9 (22.0)	218.0 (85.8)
Average precipitation days (≥ 0.2 mm)	9	7	9	10	12	10	10	10	9	10	11	10	117
Average rainy days (≥ 0.2 mm)	3	3	5	8	12	10	10	10	9	10	10	5	94
Average snowy days (≥ 0.2 cm)	6	5	4	2	0	0	0	0	0	0	2	6	25
Source: Environment Canada

== Recreational activities ==
Although Grand Lake is a wide-spread community, there are recreational activities that take place year-round. It has the Minto Centennial Arena and the Chipman Arena, lighted and unlighted ball parks, family parks, nature trails, mountain bike trails, and hunting and fishing resources.

Each year there are two festivals in Grand Lake. In summer the Minto Coal Mining Festival is celebrated in June–July, first run in 1972. The Santa Claus Parade and Tree Lighting Ceremony is celebrated in November–December, with the first annual parade held in 2010.

Once a year mountain bike racers descend on the village of Grand Lake for a race known as 'The Coal Miner's Lung'. The endurance races covers 20 km, 40 km or 60 km of Grand Lake single track.

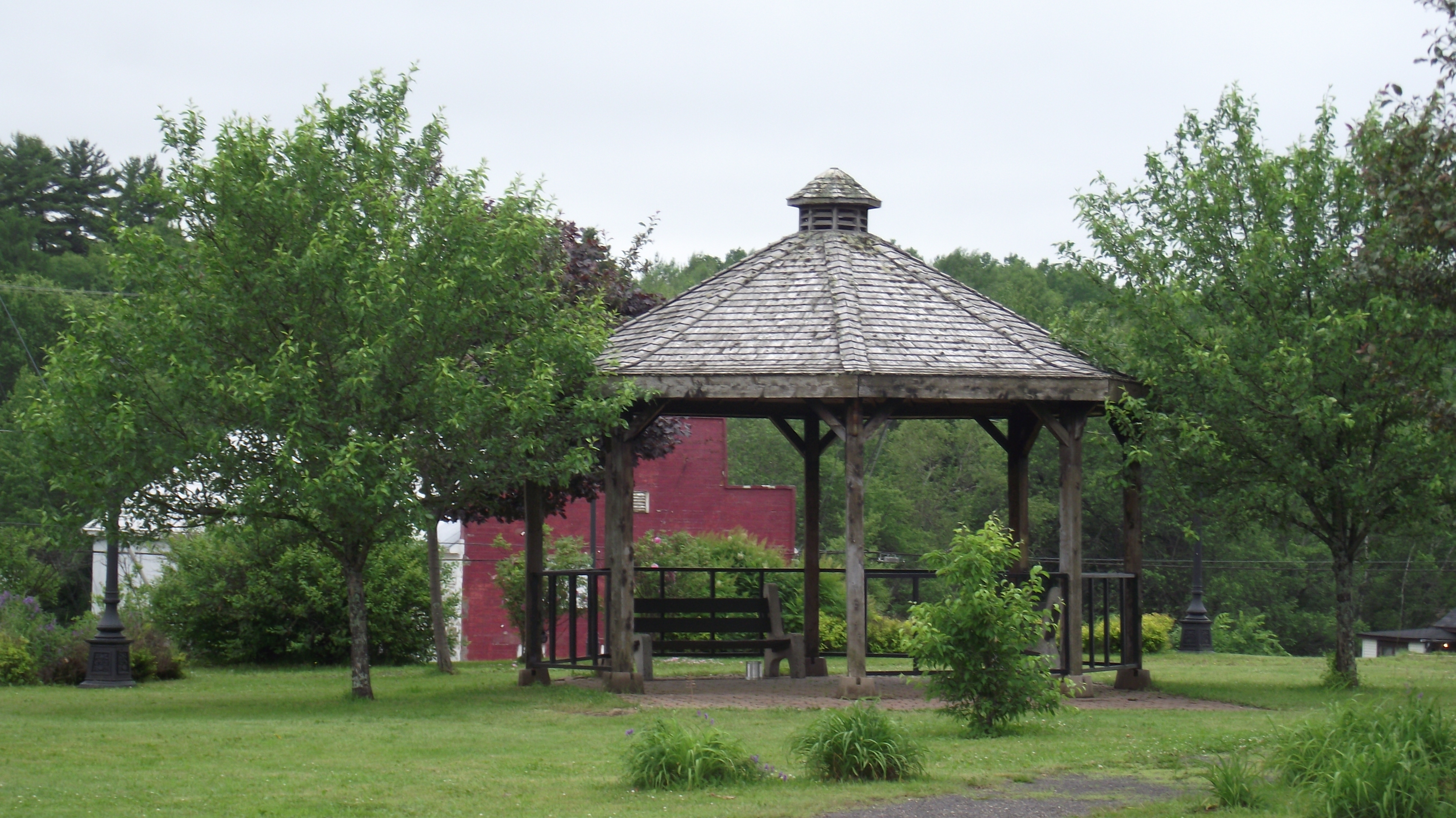
Minto Gazebo in Veterans Park summer 2013 in Grand Lake, New Brunswick.

== Education ==
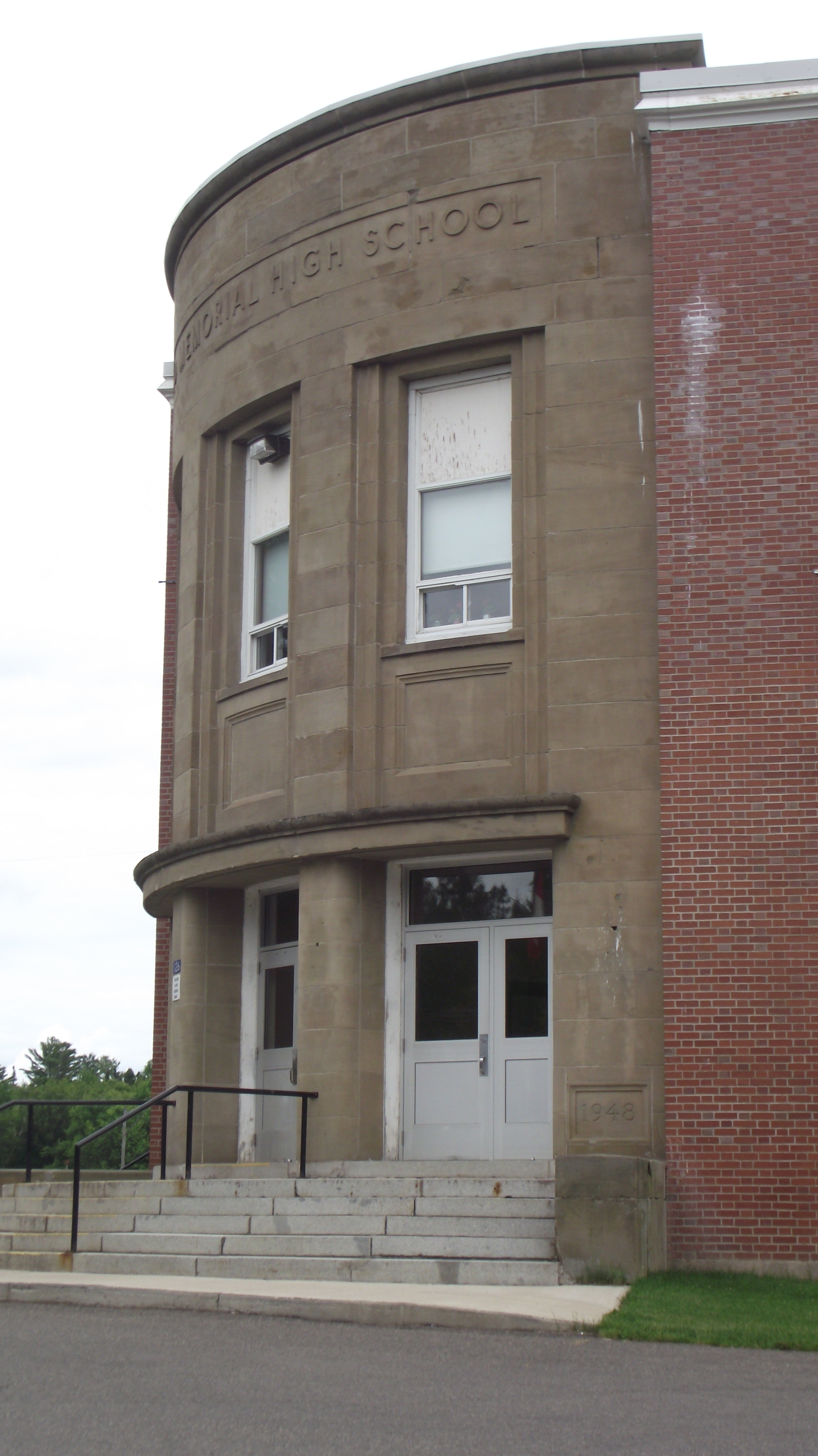
This is the front corner of the Minto Memorial High School in Grand Lake, New Brunswick, Canada

There are four schools in Grand Lake: Minto Elementary and Middle School, Minto Memorial High School, Chipman Elementary School and Chipman Forest Avenue High School. All schools offer extracurricular activities including sports clubs, destination conservation, peer helpers and student government. While Minto Elementary and Middle School is a newer building, Minto High has required some updates since the school was founded in 1939; the gym on the main floor has recently been renovated into a theatre (which MEMS has) and got a new gym located in the basement along with a shop room. In 2011 the New Brunswick Community College (NBCC) Fredericton campus established a satellite campus the Minto Regional Delivery Site.

== Notable people ==
- Elizabeth Brewster, CM SOM (1922–2012) was a poet, author, and academic.

== See also ==
- List of communities in New Brunswick
- List of municipalities in New Brunswick
