= Slope Road =

Coordinates: 46°5′35″N 66°5′59″W

Slope Road is a Canadian unincorporated community in Northfield Parish, Sunbury County, New Brunswick.

It is located 3 kilometres northwest of Minto, and near New England Settlement. The community of Sloap Road should not be confused with the street Slope Rd which runs between Slope Road and Minto.

== See also ==
- List of communities in New Brunswick
