= North Forks, New Brunswick =

Coordinates: 46°13′23″N 65°57′45″W

North Forks is a Canadian unincorporated community in Northfield Parish, Sunbury County, New Brunswick.

It is located 17 kilometres north-northeast of Minto, and near Humphrey Corner.

== See also ==
- List of communities in New Brunswick
