= Duffys Corner, New Brunswick =

Coordinates: 46.1825°N 66.025556°W

Location of Duffys Corner in New Brunswick

Duffys Corner is a Canadian unincorporated community in Northfield Parish, Sunbury County, New Brunswick.

It is located 11 kilometres north-northeast of Minto, and is near Hardwood Ridge.

== See also ==
- List of communities in New Brunswick
