= Cantor, New Brunswick =

Unincorporated community in Canada

Coordinates: 46.155278°N 66.063611°W

Location of Cantor in New Brunswick

Cantor is a Canadian unincorporated community in Northfield Parish, Sunbury County, New Brunswick.

It is located 8 kilometres north of Minto, and near Hardwood Ridge.

== See also ==
- List of communities in New Brunswick
