= Sheffield Parish =

Coordinates: 45.9955°N 66.2224°W

Sheffield
- Parish
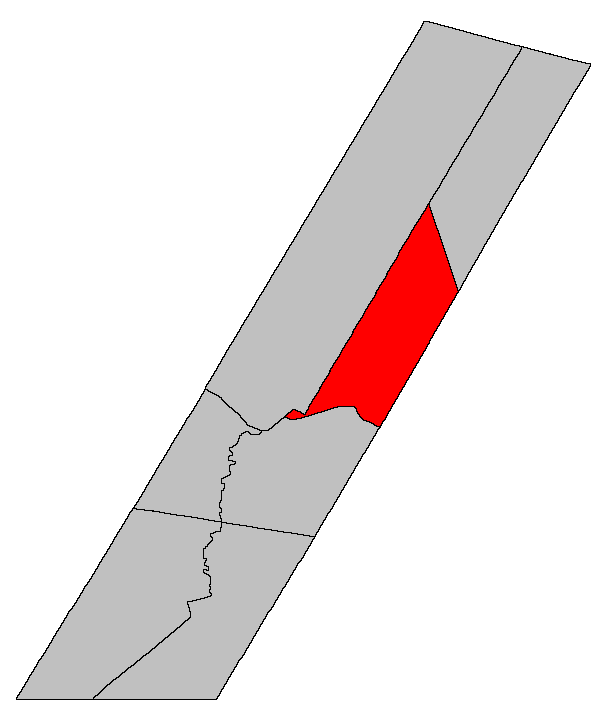
- Location within Sunbury County, New Brunswick
- Country: Canada
- Province: New Brunswick
- County: Sunbury County
- Erected: 1786

Area
  - Land: 271.29 km^{2} (104.75 sq mi)

Population (2021)
  - Total: 888
  - Density: 3.3/km^{2} (8.5/sq mi)
  - Change 2016-2021: ▲9.8%
  - Dwellings: 499
- Time zone: UTC-4 (AST)
  - Summer (DST): UTC-3 (ADT)

Sheffield is a geographic parish in Sunbury County, New Brunswick, Canada.

Prior to the 2023 governance reform, for governance purposes it formed the local service district of the parish of Sheffield, which was a member of Capital Region Service Commission (RSC11).

== Origin of name ==
The parish was named for Baron Sheffield, notable as a friend of the province.

== History ==
Sheffield was erected in 1786 as one of Sunbury County's original parishes; it extended twenty-five miles inland and included part of Northfield Parish.

In 1850 Sheffield was extended to the county line, adding unassigned territory to its rear.

In 1855 the parish was split into two polling districts, Eastern and Western. The boundary ran along the modern parish line with Northfield.

In 1857 the Eastern District was erected as Northfield Parish.

== Boundaries ==
Sheffield Parish is bounded:

- on the northeast by a line beginning on the Maugerville Parish line about 300 metres northwesterly of the mouth of Barton Brook, then running south-southwesterly along the prolongation of the eastern line of a grant to S. B. Corey on the northern side of Route 10 in New Zion, passing about 500 metres west of Colwell Street, to strike the Queens County line about 2 kilometres southwesterly of the Minto Dump Road;
- on the southeast by the Queens County line;
- on the south by the Saint John River;
- on the northwest by the southeastern line of a grant to Nathaniel Underhill and D. Palmer Jr. on the Saint John River, about 225 metres upstream of the foot of Middle Island, then northeasterly along its prolongation to the starting point;
- including Middle Island in the Saint John River.

== Communities ==
Communities at least partly within the parish.

- Albrights Corner
- Fernmount
- Lakeville Corner
- Maquapit Lake
- McGowans Corner
- Randall Corner
- Ripples
- Scale
- Sheffield

== Bodies of water ==
Bodies of water (Note: Not including brooks, ponds or coves.) at least partly within the parish.

- Little River
- Saint John River
  - Sheffield Channel
- Baltimore Stream
- Portobello Stream
- Bridges Creek
- Loders Creek
- Otter Creek
- Portobello Reach
- Brownhouse Lead
- Coldspring Lead
- Palmer Lead
- Blind Thoroughfare
- Main Thoroughfare
- The Blobs
- The Narrows
- Cowperthwaite Lake
- French Lake
- Indian Lake
- Maquapit Lake
- Upper Timber Lake

== Islands ==
Islands at least partly within the parish.

- Apple Island
- Butternut Island
- French Island
- Fulton Island
- Gull Island
- Harrison Island
- Indian Island
- Middle Island
- Princes Island

== Other notable places ==
Parks, historic sites, and other noteworthy places at least partly within the parish.

- Burpee Wildlife Management Area
- Grand Lake Protected Natural Area

== Demographics ==
=== Population ===
Population trend

Census	Population	Change (%)
2016	809	▼5.2%
2011	853	▼6.1%
2006	909	▲2.5%
2001	887	▲0.0%

=== Language ===
Mother tongue (2016)

Language	Population	Pct (%)
French only	25	3.2%
English only	765	95.0%
Both English and French	5	0.6%
Other languages	10	1.2%

== Access Routes ==
Highways and numbered routes that run through the parish, including external routes that start or finish at the parish limits:

- Highways
  - Route 10

- Principal Routes
  - Route 105

- Secondary Routes:
  - Route 670
  - Route 690

- External Routes:
  - None

== See also ==
- List of parishes in New Brunswick
