= Albrights Corner =

Albrights Corner may refer to:

- Albrights Corner (Loux Corner) a populated place in Hilltown Township, Bucks County, Pennsylvania, United States
- Albrights Corner, New Brunswick, an unincorporated community in New Brunswick, Canada
