= New Brunswick Route 670 =

Highway in New Brunswick, Canada

Coordinates: 45.964888°N 66.221015°W

Route 670

Route information
- Maintained by New Brunswick Department of Transportation
- Length: 15 km (9.3 mi)

Major junctions
- North end: Route 10 in Albrights Corner
- South end: Route 690 in Lakeville Corner

Location
- Country: Canada
- Province: New Brunswick

Highway system
- Provincial highways in New Brunswick; Former routes
← Route 655	→ Route 690

Route 670 is a 15.0-kilometre (9.3 mi) long mostly north–south secondary highway in the southwestern portion of New Brunswick, Canada. Most of the route is in New Maryland Parish.

The route starts at Route 10 in Albrights Corner, where it travels south through a mostly forested area past Ripples. It then travels southwest through Randall Corner where it turns southeast and follows the east bank of French Lake before ending at Lakeville Corner at Route 690.
