= Northfield Parish =

Northfield
- Parish
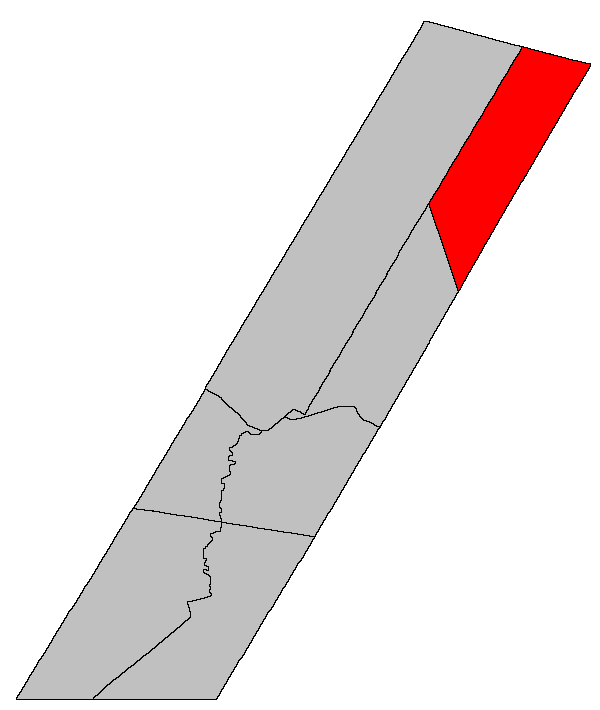
- Location within Sunbury County, New Brunswick
- Coordinates: 46.216667°N 65.999722°W
- Country: Canada
- Province: New Brunswick
- County: Sunbury
- Erected: 1857

Area
  - Land: 303.27 km^{2} (117.09 sq mi)

Population (2021)
  - Total: 577
  - Density: 1.9/km^{2} (4.9/sq mi)
  - Change 2016-2021: ▼6.9%
  - Dwellings: 286
- Time zone: UTC-4 (AST)
  - Summer (DST): UTC-3 (ADT)
- Figures do not include portion within the village of Minto

Northfield is a geographic parish in Sunbury County, New Brunswick, Canada.

Prior to the 2023 governance reform, for governance purposes it was divided between the village of Minto and the local service district of the parish of Northfield, both of which were members of Capital Region Service Commission (RSC11).

== Origin of name ==
William F. Ganong states that the parish was named for its position in the county. The origin may be simpler, as Northfield was the northern polling district of Sheffield Parish before it was erected.

== History ==
Northfield was erected in 1857 from Sheffield Parish.

== Boundaries ==
Northfield Parish is bounded:

- on the northeast by the Northumberland County line, beginning at a point about 2.6 kilometres northwesterly of Cains River, then running southeasterly;
- on the southeast by the Queens County line;
- on the southwest by a line beginning on the Queens County line about 2 kilometres southwesterly of the Minto Dump Road, then running north-northwesterly along the prolongation of the eastern line of a grant to S. B. Corey on the northern side of Route 10 in New Zion, passing about 500 metres west of Colwell Street, to the Maugerville Parish line about 300 metres northwesterly of the mouth of Barton Brook;
- on the northwest by the prolongation of the southeastern line of a grant to Nathaniel Underhill and D. Palmer Jr. on the Saint John River, about 225 metres upstream of the foot of Middle Island, running northeasterly to the starting point.

== Communities ==
Communities at least partly within the parish; bold indicates an incorporated municipality

- Cantor
- Duffys Corner
- Hardwood Ridge
- Humphrey Corner
- New Avon
- New England Settlement
- New Zion
- North Forks
- **Minto**
  - North Minto
  - Slope Road

== Bodies of water ==
Bodies of water (Note: Not including brooks, ponds or coves.) at least partly in the parish:

- North Forks Stream
- Doherty Creek
- Newcastle Creek
- Salmon Creek
- Dorsey Lake
- Jehu Lake

== Demographics ==
Parish population total does not include portion within Minto

=== Population ===
**Population trend**

Census	Population	Change (%)
2016	620	▼3.6%
2011	643	▼11.8%
2006	729	▲0.1 %
2001	728	▼9.1%
1996	801	N/A

=== Language ===
**Mother tongue (2016)**

Language	Population	Pct (%)
English only	590	94.4%
French only	20	3.2%
Other languages	10	1.6%
Both English and French	5	0.8%

== See also ==
- List of parishes in New Brunswick
