= New Avon, New Brunswick =

Coordinates: 46°4′17″N 66°5′59″W

New Avon is a Canadian unincorporated community in Northfield Parish, Sunbury County, New Brunswick.

== Location ==
It is located 3 kilometres southwest of Minto.

== See also ==
- List of communities in New Brunswick
