= New Zion, New Brunswick =

Coordinates: 46°3′17″N 66°6′8″W

New Zion is a Canadian unincorporated community in Northfield Parish, Sunbury County, New Brunswick.

It is located 5 kilometres southwest of Minto.

== History ==
New Zion was settled in 1860 and by 1866 it became a farming and coal mining settlement of about three families (Cokeley / Coakley, Corey, and Sowers, however New Zion was in Sheffield Parish by at least as early as 1851 as Northfield Parish was not established until 1857. James H. Sowers was the first postmaster of New Zion, with the first post office established in 1875.

== See also ==
- List of communities in New Brunswick
