= Sunbury County, New Brunswick =

County in New Brunswick, Canada

Coordinates: 45°55′N 66°20′W

Sunbury
- County
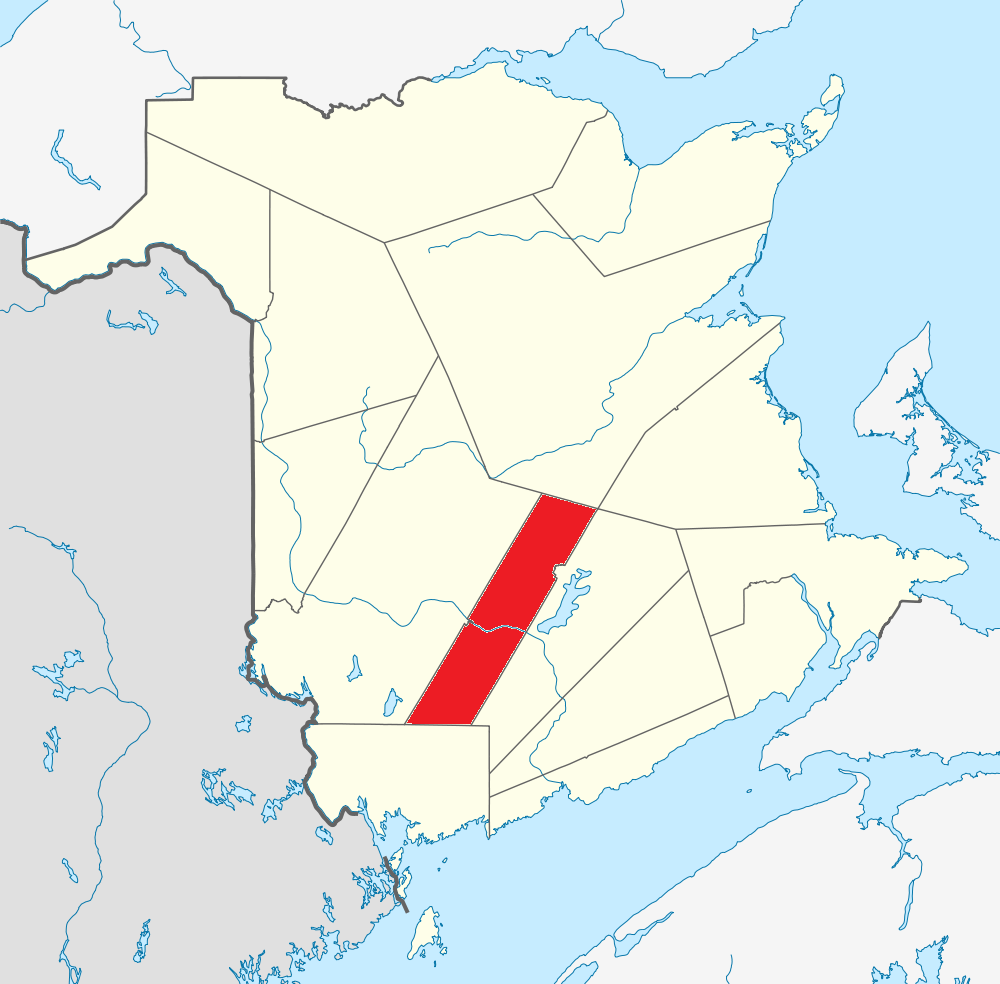
- Location within New Brunswick.
- Country: Canada
- Province: New Brunswick
- Established: 1785

Area
  - Land: 2,692.97 km^{2} (1,039.76 sq mi)

Population (2021)
  - Total: 27,864
  - Density: 10.3/km^{2} (27/sq mi)
  - Change 2016-2021: ▲0.8%
  - Dwellings: 11,903
- Time zone: UTC-4 (AST)
  - Summer (DST): UTC-3 (ADT)
- Area code: 506

Sunbury County (2021 population 27,864) is located in central New Brunswick, Canada. A large military base (CFB Gagetown) is located in the western part of the county south of the town of Oromocto. The county also hosts forestry and mixed farming. Burton is the county shire town.

== Census subdivisions ==
=== Communities ===
There are three municipalities within Sunbury County (listed by 2016 population):

| Official name | Designation | Area km^{2} | Population | Parish |
|---|---|---|---|---|
| Oromocto | Town | 22.44 | 9,223 | Burton |
| Fredericton Junction | Village | 23.85 | 704 | Gladstone |
| Tracy | Village | 29.46 | 608 | Gladstone |

Much of the Village of Minto lies within Sunbury County, but since most of it is in Queens County, Statistics Canada considers it as part of Queens. Similarly, a small portion of the city of Fredericton lies within Sunbury County, but is counted as part of York.

=== First Nations ===
There is one First Nations reservation in Sunbury County (listed by 2016 population):

| Official name | Designation | Area km^{2} | Population | Parish |
|---|---|---|---|---|
| Oromocto 26 | Reservation | 0.31 | 282 | Burton |

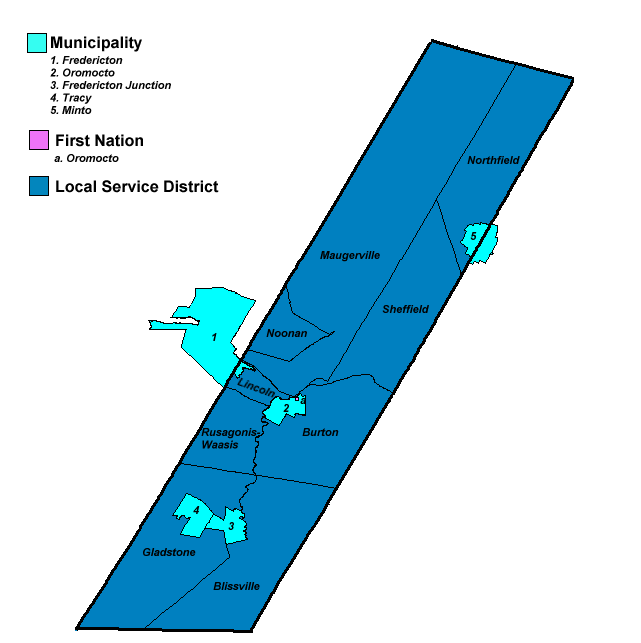
Map of municipal government units in Sunbury County.

=== Parishes ===
The county is subdivided into seven parishes (listed by 2016 population):

| Official name | Area km^{2} | Population | Municipalities | Unincorporated communities |
|---|---|---|---|---|
| Lincoln | 159.59 | 7,177 | | Lincoln / Lower Lincoln / Rusagonis-Waasis / Rusagonis Station / Sunpoke |
| Burton | 259.10 | 5,119 | Oromocto (town); Oromocto 26 (reservation) | Babbitt / Burpees Corner / Burton / French Lake / Geary / Goan / Haneytown / Lower Burton / McGowans Corner / Sheffield / Swan Creek / Waterville / Woodside |
| Maugerville | 921.96 | 1,831 | | Maugerville / Noonan / Sunbury / Upper Maugerville |
| Blissville | 341.74 | 919 | | Blissville / Central Blissville / Germany / Hoyt / Juvenile Settlement / Mill Settlement / Mill Settlement West / Patterson / Sand Brook |
| Sheffield | 272.16 | 809 | | Albrights Corner / Fernmount / Lakeville Corner / Randall Corner / Ripples / Scale / Sheffield |
| Northfield | 303.77 | 620 | | Cantor / Duffys Corner / Hardwood Ridge / Humphrey Corner / New Avon / New England Settlement / New Zion / North Forks / Slope Road |
| Gladstone | 362.23 | 452 | Fredericton Junction (village); Tracy (village) | Gladstone / Three Tree Creek / Tracyville / Upper Tracy / Vespra |

== Demographics ==
As a census division in the 2021 Census of Population conducted by Statistics Canada, Sunbury County had a population of 27,864 living in 11,310 of its 11,903 total private dwellings, a change of 0.8% from its 2016 population of 27,644. With a land area of 2,692.97 km^{2} (1,039.76 sq mi), it had a population density of 10.3/km^{2} (26.8/sq mi) in 2021.

Population trend

| Census | Population | Change (%) |
|---|---|---|
| 2016 | 27,644 | ▲1.8% |
| 2011 | 27,143 | ▲6.3% |
| 2006 | 25,542 | ▼0.9% |
| 2001 | 25,776 | ▲1.6% |
| 1996 | 25,358 | ▲7.6% |
| 1991 | 23,575 | N/A |

Mother tongue (2016)

| Language | Population | Pct (%) |
|---|---|---|
| English only | 24,175 | 87.7% |
| French only | 2,670 | 9.7% |
| Other languages | 480 | 1.7% |
| Both English and French | 235 | 0.9% |

== Access Routes ==
Highways and numbered routes that run through the county, including external routes that start or finish at the county limits:

- Highways
  - Route 2 (TCH)
  - Route 7
  - Route 10
- Principal Routes
  - Route 101
  - Route 102
  - Route 105
  - Route 123
- Secondary Routes:
  - Route 645
  - Route 655
  - Route 690
  - Route 785
- External Routes:
  - None

== See also ==
- List of communities in New Brunswick
- Sunbury County, Nova Scotia
