= Humphrey Corner, New Brunswick =

Coordinates: 46.186111°N 65.987778°W

Location of Humphrey Corner in New Brunswick

Humphrey Corner is a Canadian unincorporated community in Northfield Parish, Sunbury County, New Brunswick.

It is located 13 kilometres north-northeast of Minto.

== See also ==
- List of communities in New Brunswick
