= New England Settlement, New Brunswick =

Coordinates: 46°4′38″N 66°5′48″W

New England Settlement is a Canadian unincorporated community in Northfield Parish, Sunbury County, New Brunswick.

It is located 3 kilometres west of Minto.

== See also ==
- List of communities in New Brunswick
