= Maugerville Parish =

Maugerville
- Parish
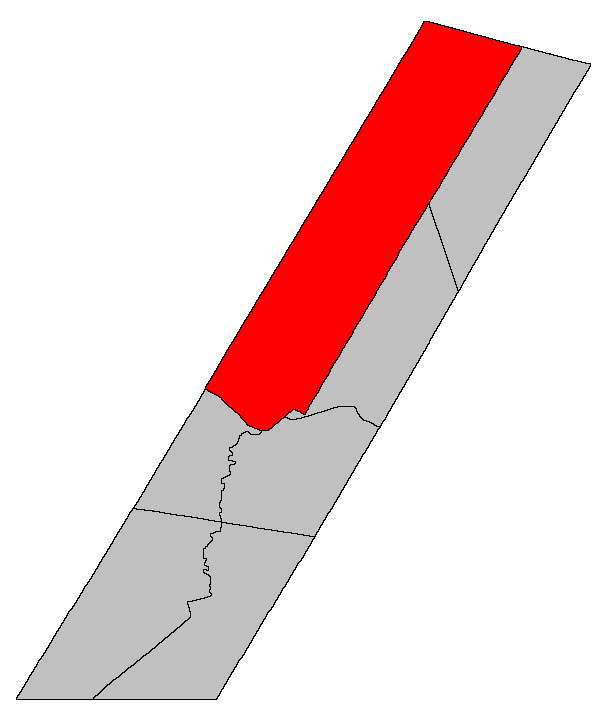
- Location within Sunbury County, New Brunswick
- Coordinates: 45.8675°N 66.4525°W
- Country: Canada
- Province: New Brunswick
- County: Sunbury
- Erected: 1786

Area
  - Land: 919.94 km^{2} (355.19 sq mi)

Population (2021)
  - Total: 1,772
  - Density: 1.9/km^{2} (4.9/sq mi)
  - Change 2016-2021: ▼3.2%
  - Dwellings: 726
- Time zone: UTC-4 (AST)
  - Summer (DST): UTC-3 (ADT)

Maugerville (/ˈmeɪdʒərvɪl/ MAY-jər-vil) is a geographic parish in Sunbury County, New Brunswick, Canada.

Prior to the 2023 governance reform, for governance purposes it was divided between the local service districts of Noonan and the parish of Maugerville (which further includes the special service area of Inner Maugerville), both of which were members of Capital Region Service Commission (RSC11).

== Origin of name ==
The parish was named in honour of Joshua Mauger, Nova Scotia's agent in England and first name on the list of grantees in the township.

== History ==
Maugerville was first established in 1765 as a township of Nova Scotia. The boundaries were significantly different, including part of Sheffield Parish but not extending as far inland.

Maugerville was erected in 1786 as one of Sunbury County's original parishes.

In 1850 Maugerville was extended to the county line, adding unassigned land to its rear.

== Boundaries ==
Maugerville Parish is bounded:

- on the northeast by the Northumberland County line;
- on the southeast by a line beginning about on the county line about 2.6 kilometres northwesterly of Cains River, then following the prolongation of the southeastern line of a grant to Nathaniel Underhill and D. Palmer Jr. on the Saint John River, about 225 metres upstream of the foot of Middle Island, then following the prolongation southwesterly to the Saint John;
- on the southwest by the Saint John River;
- on the northwest by the York County line;
- including Oromocto Island in the Saint John River.

== Communities ==
Communities at least partly within the parish. italics indicate a name no longer in official use

- Lower St. Marys
- Maugerville
- Noonan (Rear Maugerville)
- Sunbury
- Upper Maugerville

== Bodies of water ==
Bodies of water (Note: Not including brooks, ponds or coves.) at least partly within the parish.

- Cains River
- Gaspereau River
- Little River
- Saint John River
- Bartlett Millstream
- Burpee Millstream
  - Burpee Deadwater
- Little Portobello Stream
- Noonan Stream
- Portobello Stream
- Estey Creek
- Mud Creek
- Newcastle Creek
- Brook Styx
- more than ten officially named lakes

== Islands ==
Islands at least partly within the parish.

- Bear Island
- Long Island
- Oromocto Island

== Other notable places ==
Parks, historic sites, and other noteworthy places at least partly within the parish.

- Acadia Forestry Station
- Bantalor Wildlife Management Area
- Bull Pasture Bog Protected Natural Area
- Burpee Wildlife Management Area
- Burpee Lake Protected Natural Area
- Gaspereau Protected Natural Area
- Grand Lake Protected Natural Area
- Little Forks Brook Protected Natural Area
- Little River Protected Natural Area
- Portobello Creek National Wildlife Area

== Demographics ==
=== Population ===
Population trend

Census	Population	Change (%)
2016	1,831	▼3.1%
2011	1,776	▲3.6%
2006	1,715	▼0.9%
2001	1,730	▲11.4%
1996	1,553	▲5.9%
1991	1,467	N/A

=== Language ===
Mother tongue (2016)

Language	Population	Pct (%)
English only	1,680	91.9%
French only	100	5.5%
Other languages	40	2.2%
Both English and French	10	0.6%

== See also ==
- List of parishes in New Brunswick
