= Hardwood Ridge, New Brunswick =

Unincorporated community in New Brunswick, Canada

Coordinates: 46.154167°N 66.0375°W

Location of Hardwood Rige in New Brunswick

Hardwood Ridge is an unincorporated community in Northfield Parish, Sunbury County, New Brunswick, Canada.

It is located eight kilometres north-northeast of Minto.

== History ==
Hardwood Ridge was a farming community in 1866, there was a population of about forty families. Part of Hardwood Ridge used to be Linton between 1866 and 1932, a community with a population of one-hundred in 1871; Stephen Linton was the first postmaster of Linton.

== See also ==
- List of communities in New Brunswick
