= Loux Corner, Hilltown Township, Bucks County, Pennsylvania =

Unincorporated community in Pennsylvania, US

Loux Corner (Albrights Corner)
- Populated place
- Loux Corner, Hilltown Township, Bucks County, Pennsylvania Loux Corner (the United States)
- Coordinates: 40°20′49″N 75°13′25″W
- Country: United States
- State: Pennsylvania
- County: Bucks
- Elevation: 623 ft (190 m)
- Time zone: UTC-5 (EST)
  - Summer (DST): UTC-4 (EDT)
- ZIP Code: 18944
- Area codes: 215, 267, and 445

Loux Corner (or Louxs Corner) is a populated place consisting of five or six homes in Hilltown Township, Bucks County, Pennsylvania, United States. Formerly, it was known as Albrights Corner.

== History ==
Albrights Corner was named for Daniel Albright, whose family name was originally Albrecht. He arrived in Philadelphia from Germany, landing on 6 January 1791 and after living in Tinicum Township, Delaware County relocated to Bucks County in 1830. A very old house with 6 acres (2.4 ha) in 'The Corner' was purchased by Thomas Shewell who sold it to Thomas Mathias in 1788. Mathias opened a store in the house. Later, the house and store was sold in 1852 to Daniel Albright's son Henry, who was also a Justice of the Peace. The store was closed in the late 1800s. One of Albright's descendants, Charles A. Cuffel, was a Lieutenant in the Union Army during the American Civil War, serving in Independent Battery D, Pennsylvania Volunteer Artillery. After the war, Cuffel served as Deputy Recorder of Deeds in Bucks County. Cuffel was also the author of the book 'History of Durell's Bettery in the Civil War (Independent Battery D. Pennsylvania Volunteer Artillery'.

== Geography ==
Albrights Corner is located approximately 6.5 km (4 miles) southeast of Perkasie at the intersection of Old Bethlehem Road (now Upper Church Road) and Hilltown Pike, and is located within the Perkasie 18944 ZIP Code, and the Pennridge School District.
