= Ripples, New Brunswick =

Community in New Brunswick, Canada

Coordinates: 45.983°N 66.200°W

Ripples is a community in the Canadian province of New Brunswick near the village of Minto and Route 10 on the Little River.

== History ==
Ripples housed a World War Two internment camp known as Internment Camp B70, from 1940 to 1945. This camp held internees of many different nationalities. The most famous prisoner was Camillien Houde, mayor of Montreal at the time, who was interned for encouraging resistance to military conscription. The internment camp museum is located in Minto.

== See also ==
- List of communities in New Brunswick
