= Albrights Corner, New Brunswick =

Coordinates: 46.023083°N 66.189083°W

Location of Albrights Corner in New Brunswick

Albrights Corner is an unincorporated community in the Canadian province of New Brunswick.

== History ==
Albrights Corner was originally called Little River but popularly became named after Thomas Sidney Albright (d. 1914), who owned and operated a farm and general store there for many years. His widow Lillian (Jordan) continued to operate the farm until the late 1950s.

According to the census, the population in 2021 was 888 inhabitants.

== See also ==
- List of communities in New Brunswick
