= Minto, New Brunswick =

Minto
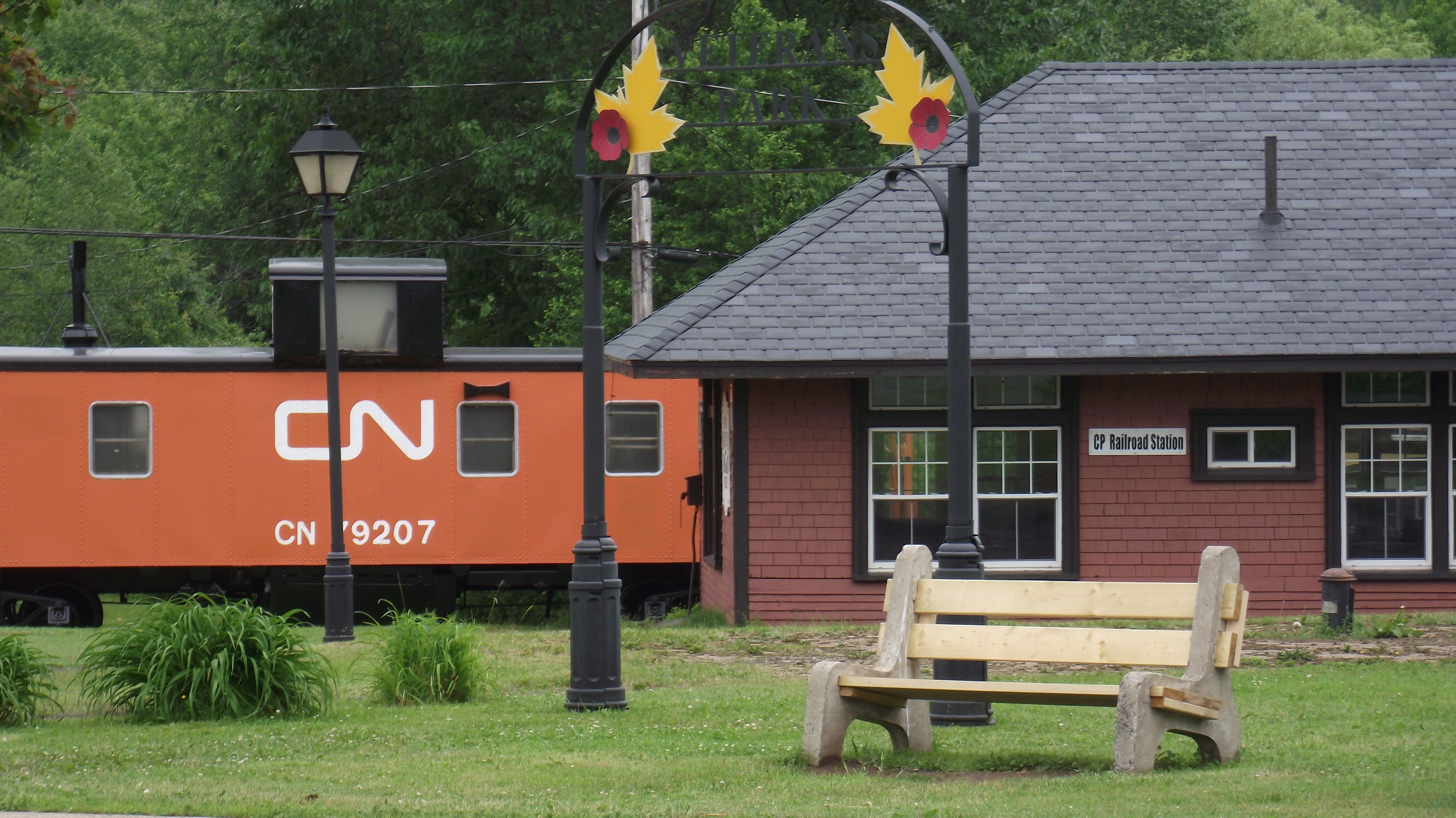
- Minto Museum and Veterans Park 2013, Minto, New Brunswick

- Location of Minto within New Brunswick.
- Coordinates: 46°08′59″N 66°06′24″W
- Country: Canada
- Province: New Brunswick
- County: Queens County
- Parish: Canning Parish
- Municipality: Grand Lake
- Incorporated: 1904
- Named for: Gilbert Elliot-Murray-Kynynmound, 4th Earl of Minto

Area
  - Land: 31.36 km^{2} (12.11 sq mi)

Population (2021)
  - Total: 2,234
  - Density: 71.2/km^{2} (184/sq mi)
  - Change (2016–21): ▼3.1%
- Time zone: UTC−4 (Atlantic (AST))
  - Summer (DST): UTC−3 (Atlantic Daylight Time (ADT))
- Canadian Postal code: xxx
- Area code: 506

Minto is a community straddling the boundary of Sunbury County and Queens County, New Brunswick, Canada. It is located on the north shore of Grand Lake, approximately 50 kilometres northeast of Fredericton. Minto held village status prior to 2023, when it was amalgamated into the newly formed village of Grand Lake.

Minto is known to have taken its present name in 1904 upon the retirement of Canada's eighth Governor General, The Earl of Minto. and the story remains that the village adopted its name from the local Minto Hotel. From the St. John Daily Sun of 1903:

"Just how the name of Minto came to be adopted is said to have occurred in this way. A letter which was sent from Moncton to Mr. Kennedy was enclosed in an envelope which bore the name of the Minto hotel, Moncton. The family thought Minto a good name for their hotel, and so it was named. Then the people generally adopted the name for the place, and so the railway people designated it."

== History ==
The Grand Lake Coal Mining industry began in the 1630s when French Acadian settlers learned about surface deposits of coal in the Coal Creek area (Now Chipman, New Brunswick). The French used coal in their fort at the mouth of the Saint John river and in 1639 began selling coal to the British colony in what is now Boston, Massachusetts. This first export of coal has been recognized as a National Historic Event by the Historic Sites and Monuments Board of Parks Canada.

During recession and the Great Depression, Minto was protected from most of the effects of the economic downturn due to the profitability of the coal market at that time. The coal mines brought a level of financial prosperity to the community in the early 1900s, which by the late 1930s turned into a profitable venture for entrepreneurs and industrialists.

Early in Minto's coal mining exploits, land owners were permitted to mine under their own land without obtaining a license from the Crown or paying any royalties, which ended in 1915.

=== Amalgamation of Minto and surrounding communities ===
On 1 January 2023, Minto was amalgamated with the village of Chipman and all or part of five local service districts to form the new municipal entity of Grand Lake. The community's name remains in official use.

The villages of Minto and Chipman protested the forced amalgamation. The mayor of Minto (2021), Erica Barnett, stated in a letter posted on the Village of Minto's Facebook page that "the government's current plan is absolutely not in the best interest for either Minto or Chipman..." She mentioned also that this was a fact of reducing the provincial funding the villages got. This created an uproar among the townsfolk who were scared of losing the few things the village had, such as their cared-for arena. The public also feared "having to combine health clinics, schools and fire stations." The distance of 24 km between the two villages could ultimately cause major issues.

== Coal Mining Industry ==
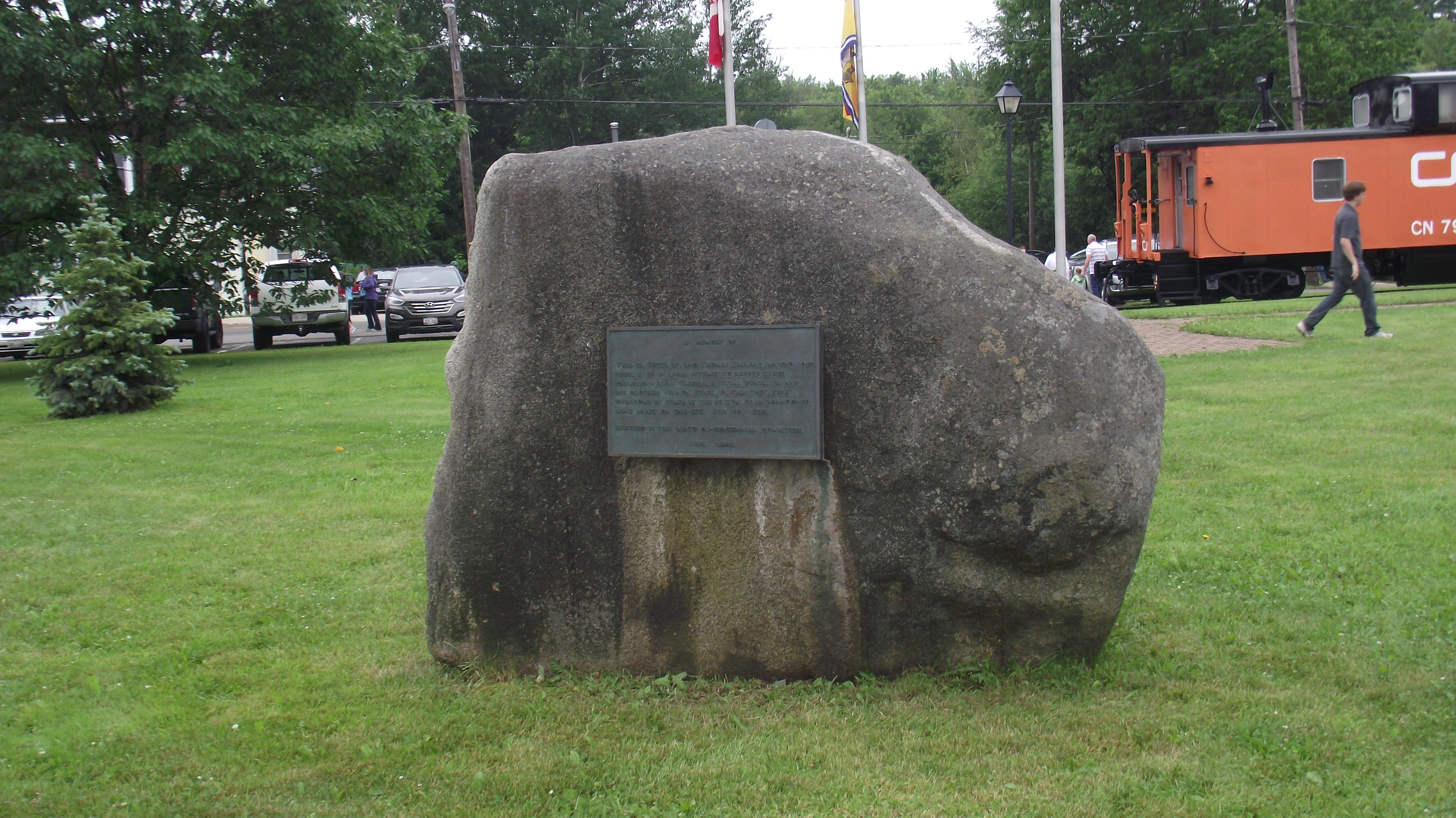
The memorial stone of five who died in an abandoned mine shaft in 1932, Minto, New Brunswick, Canada.

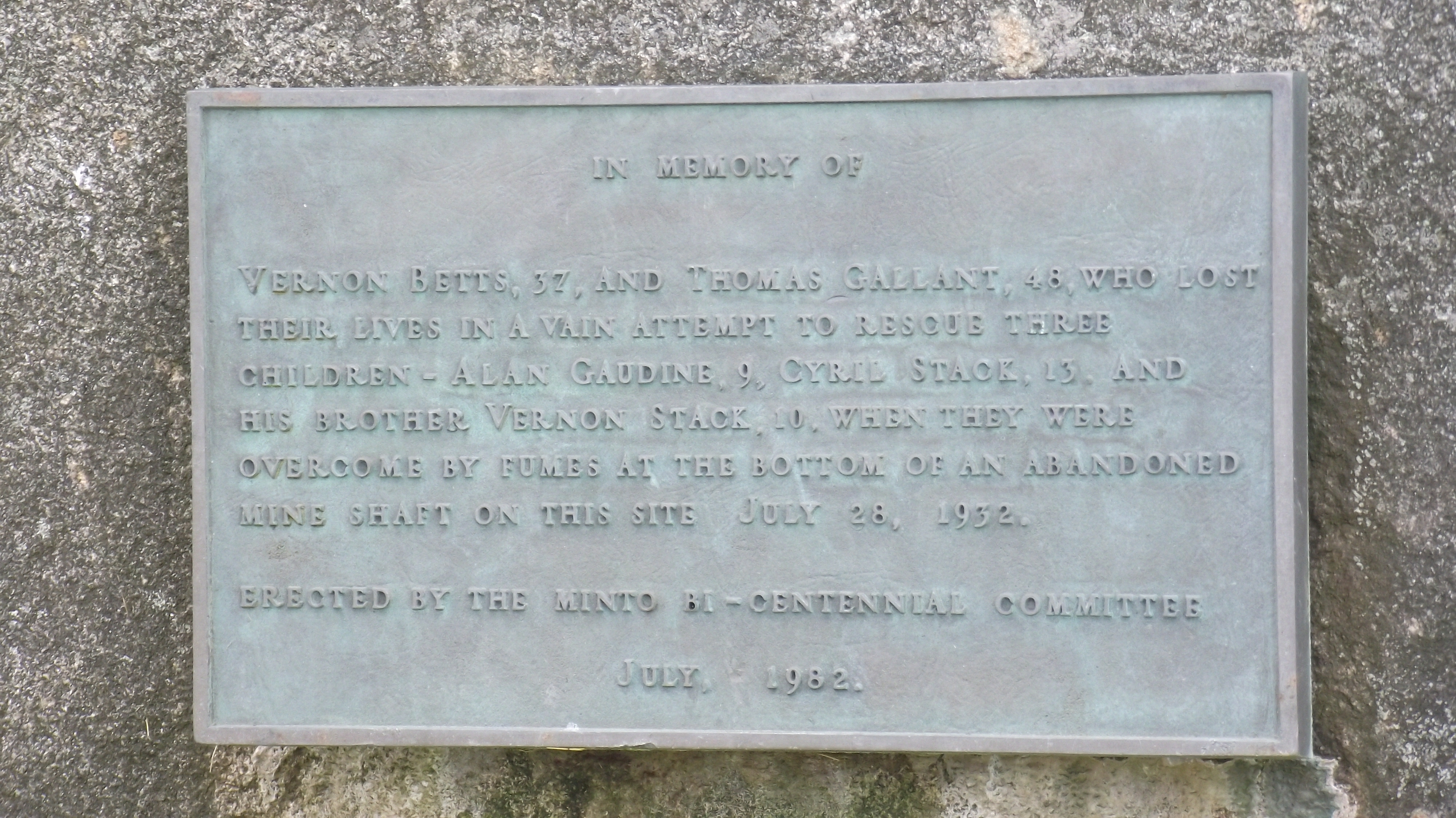
The inscription (1982) on the Minto Memorial Stone.

Minto was connected to the national railway in order to transport coal. This was to make Minto "the most prosperous place in Canada." The New Brunswick Central Railway ended at Chipman (about 15 miles (24 km) north-east of Minto) and in 1901 the railway was planned to be completed by constructing through the village to Fredericton, and connect with the Canadian Pacific railway. By 1904 the railway was completed as far as Minto, merging with the existing Central, however by 1905 the connection to Fredericton was abandoned and the remaining railway was not built until 1913.

Although the railway lines through Minto have since been removed, the railway station continues on as a local historic site. The Minto Coal mine ceased operations in 2010 with the closure of NB Coal.

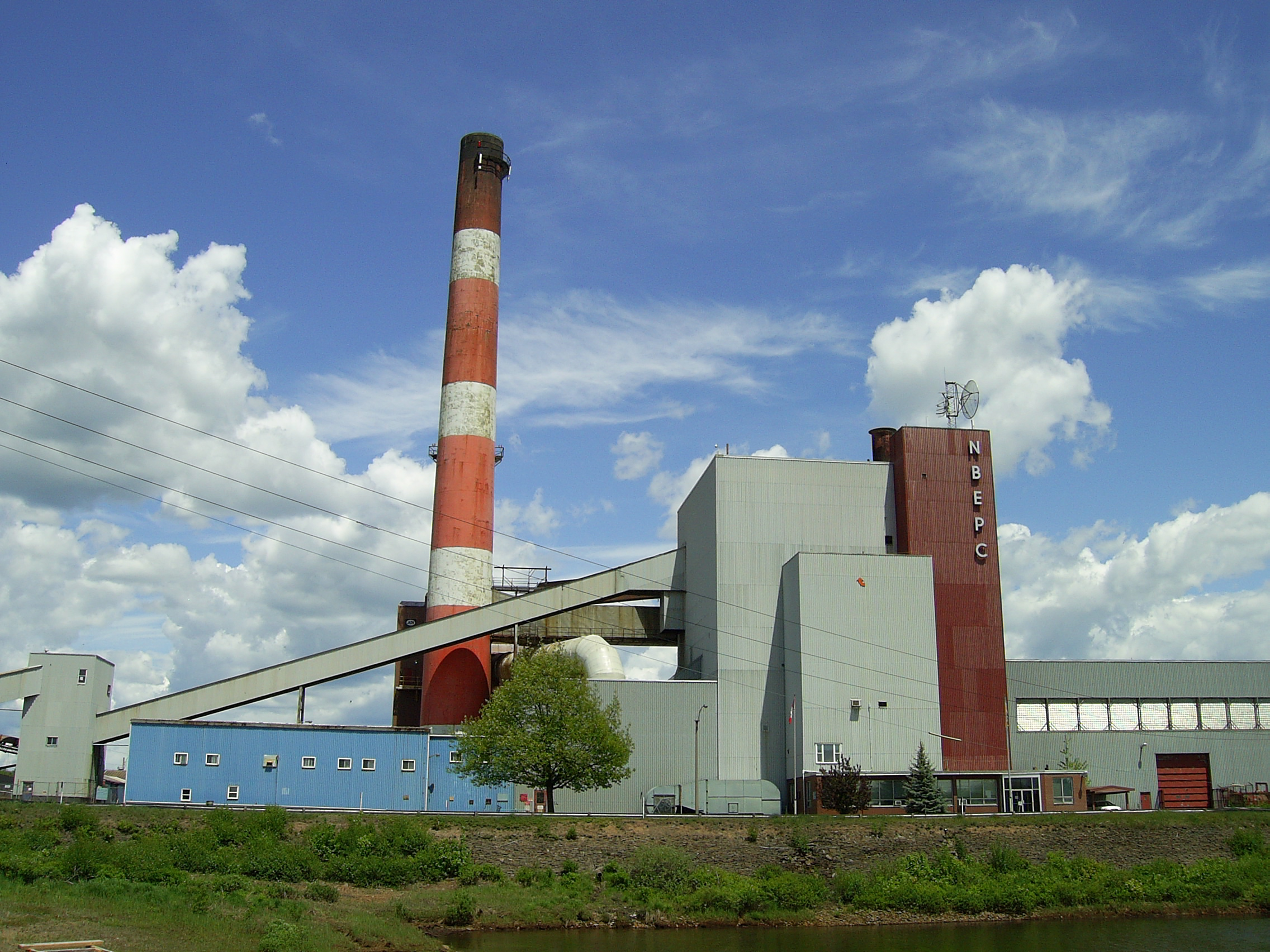
The Grand Lake Generating Station near Minto, New Brunswick, as seen in May 2010.

During the early years of the Great Depression, the New Brunswick Power Corporation built the province's first thermal generating station south of the village on the shores of Grand Lake. Opened in 1931, the Grand Lake Generating Station accessed coal from nearby deposits. An NB Power subsidiary, NB Coal, was the only mining company left in the Minto area and performed strip mining. NB Power closed the Grand Lake Station when its operating license expired in June 2010. As the Station has been NB Coal’s only customer since 2000, NB Coal closed in December 2009. On April 19, 2012 the Grand Lake Generating Station was demolished, and by this time all coal mining in Minto had ended.

== World War II internment camp ==
During the Second World War, the largest internment camp in eastern Canada was located in the hamlet of Ripples, 10 km west of the village of Minto. Originally it was home to German and Austrian Jews, both orthodox and non-observant, as well as to other refugees, all of whom had fled the Nazis to England. Some prisoners later became notable, including theologian Gregory Baum, chemist Ernest Eliel and physicist Walter Kohn. Later, after these refugees had been released into Canadian life, it became a camp mostly for German and Italian prisoners of war, as well as some sympathizers such as Canadian fascist Adrien Arcand. Its most notable prisoner at this time was the anti-conscriptionist mayor of Montreal, Camillien Houde.

This internment camp is now a protected site visited by tourists. The only structure remaining at the site is the base of a water-tower where a plaque stands, visible from the highway. A walking trail leads into the forest where a few ruins of the camp and posted signs describing the area may be found. There is a small museum dedicated to the camp located within Minto's municipal building.

== Climate ==
Climate data for Minto
Month	Jan	Feb	Mar	Apr	May	Jun	Jul	Aug	Sep	Oct	Nov	Dec	Year
Record high °C (°F)	13.9 (57.0)	15.6 (60.1)	18.0 (64.4)	29.0 (84.2)	35.0 (95.0)	35.0 (95.0)	35.6 (96.1)	35.0 (95.0)	34.4 (93.9)	27.8 (82.0)	23.3 (73.9)	15.0 (59.0)	35.6 (96.1)
Mean daily maximum °C (°F)	−3.3 (26.1)	−2.2 (28.0)	3.0 (37.4)	9.1 (48.4)	16.5 (61.7)	22.3 (72.1)	25.2 (77.4)	24.3 (75.7)	19.3 (66.7)	13.0 (55.4)	6.3 (43.3)	−1.1 (30.0)	11.0 (51.8)
Daily mean °C (°F)	−8.9 (16.0)	−8.1 (17.4)	−2.4 (27.7)	4.1 (39.4)	10.7 (51.3)	16.4 (61.5)	19.6 (67.3)	18.7 (65.7)	13.8 (56.8)	8.1 (46.6)	2.3 (36.1)	−5.7 (21.7)	5.7 (42.3)
Mean daily minimum °C (°F)	−14.6 (5.7)	−14.2 (6.4)	−7.9 (17.8)	−1.1 (30.0)	4.8 (40.6)	10.3 (50.5)	14.0 (57.2)	13.1 (55.6)	8.3 (46.9)	3.2 (37.8)	−1.7 (28.9)	−10.8 (12.6)	0.3 (32.5)
Record low °C (°F)	−40.0 (−40.0)	−39.4 (−38.9)	−31.0 (−23.8)	−17.0 (1.4)	−5.0 (23.0)	−3.5 (25.7)	3.3 (37.9)	2.5 (36.5)	−2.5 (27.5)	−10.0 (14.0)	−18.5 (−1.3)	−33.3 (−27.9)	−40.0 (−40.0)
Average precipitation mm (inches)	82.0 (3.23)	72.7 (2.86)	69.4 (2.73)	72.9 (2.87)	85.8 (3.38)	80.0 (3.15)	83.7 (3.30)	81.6 (3.21)	87.0 (3.43)	90.5 (3.56)	97.6 (3.84)	108.4 (4.27)	1,011.5 (39.82)
Average rainfall mm (inches)	27.6 (1.09)	26.2 (1.03)	34.7 (1.37)	56.5 (2.22)	85.4 (3.36)	80.0 (3.15)	83.7 (3.30)	81.6 (3.21)	87.0 (3.43)	90.3 (3.56)	85.0 (3.35)	51.3 (2.02)	789.3 (31.07)
Average snowfall cm (inches)	52.1 (20.5)	45.4 (17.9)	34.9 (13.7)	16.6 (6.5)	0.5 (0.2)	0.0 (0.0)	0.0 (0.0)	0.0 (0.0)	0.0 (0.0)	0.6 (0.2)	12.0 (4.7)	55.9 (22.0)	218.0 (85.8)
Average precipitation days (≥ 0.2 mm)	9	7	9	10	12	10	10	10	9	10	11	10	117
Average rainy days (≥ 0.2 mm)	3	3	5	8	12	10	10	10	9	10	10	5	94
Average snowy days (≥ 0.2 cm)	6	5	4	2	0	0	0	0	0	0	2	6	25
Source: Environment Canada

== Demographics ==
In the 2021 Census of Population conducted by Statistics Canada, Minto had a population of 2,234 living in 1,043 of its 1,145 total private dwellings, a change of −3.1% from its 2016 population of 2,305. With a land area of 31.36 km^{2} (12.11 sq mi), it had a population density of 71.2/km^{2} (184.5/sq mi) in 2021.

== Recreational activities ==
Though Minto is a very small community, there are recreational activities that take place year-round. It has the Minto Centennial Arena, lighted and unlighted ball parks, two family parks, nature trails, mountain bike trails, and hunting and fishing resources.

Each year, there are two festivals in Minto. In summer, the Minto Coal Mining Festival is celebrated in June–July, first run in 1972. The Santa Claus Parade and Tree Lighting Ceremony is celebrated in November–December, with the first annual parade held in 2010.

Once a year, mountain bike racers descend on the town of Minto for a race known as 'The Coal Miner's Lung'. The endurance race covers 20 km, 40 km, or 60 km of Minto single track.

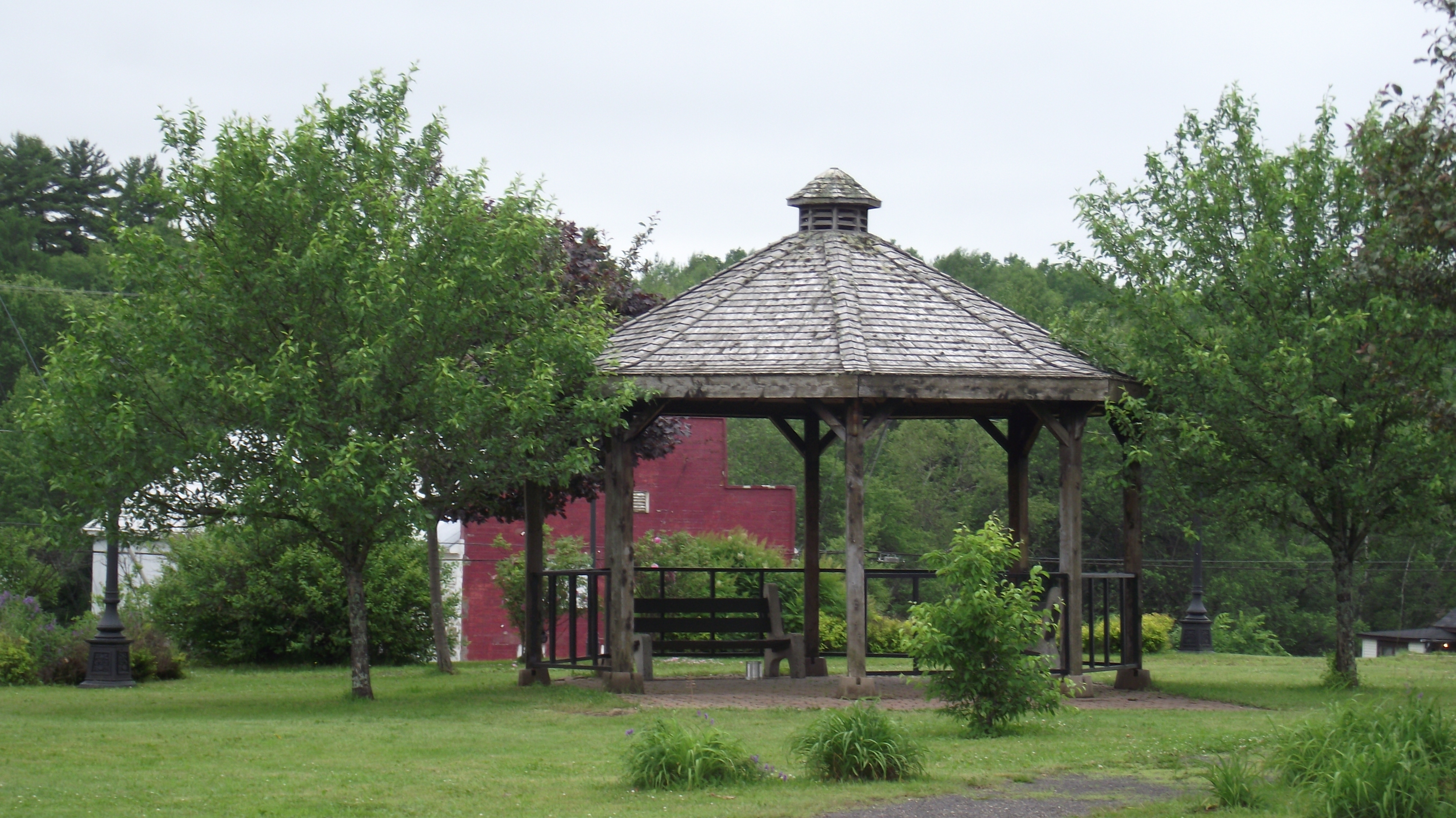
Minto Gazebo in Veterans Park summer 2013 in Minto, New Brunswick.

== Education ==
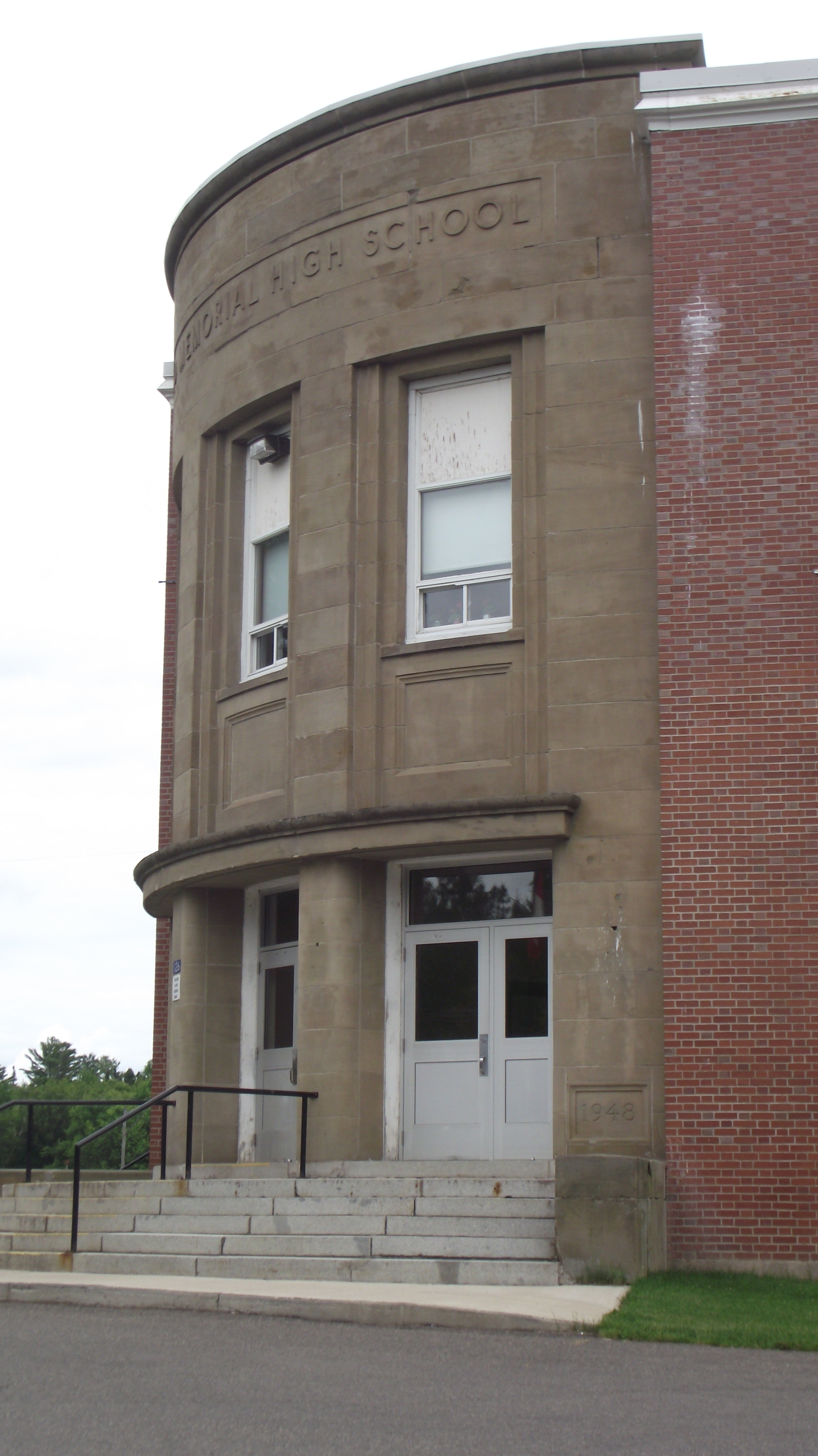
This is the front corner of the Minto Memorial High School in Minto, New Brunswick, Canada

There are two schools in Minto: Minto Elementary and Middle School, and Minto Memorial High School. Both schools offer extracurricular activities including sports clubs, destination conservation, peer helpers and student government. While Minto Elementary and Middle School is a newer building, Minto High has required some updates since the school was founded in 1939; the gym on the main floor has recently been renovated into a theatre (which MEMS has) and got a new gym located in the basement along with a shop room. In 2011 the New Brunswick Community College (NBCC) Fredericton campus established a satellite campus the Minto Regional Delivery Site.

== See also ==
- List of communities in New Brunswick
