= List of people from New Brunswick =

People from Province of Canada

Provincial flag of New Brunswick

This is a list of notable people who are from New Brunswick, Canada, or have spent a large part or formative part of their career in that province.

== By city or town ==
Click on the "people from..." link below to go to the full page of notable people, or click "show" next to each page to view the table within this page.

People from Bathurst
Name	Known for	Birth	Death	Other
David Branch	ice hockey	1948	2026	commissioner of the Canadian Hockey League and Ontario Hockey League
Charlie Chamberlain	entertainer	1911	1972	a featured entertainer on Don Messer's Jubilee on CBC Television, 1957–1969
Jodi Cooke	journalist	1979		NTV Sunday Evening News Hour anchor
Sean Couturier	ice hockey	1992		NHL hockey player currently with the Philadelphia Flyers
Joe De Grasse	film director	1873	1940	pioneer Hollywood film director
Sam De Grasse	actor	1875	1953	known primarily for playing crafty and villainous film roles
Lyse Doucet	journalist	1958		BBC journalist
James Dunn	industrialist	1874	1956	banker, art collector, industrialist, philanthropist
Robert Frigault	author	1971		author, publisher, activist
Herman James Good	soldier	1887	1969	Bathurst-born recipient of the Victoria Cross for actions during the Battle of Amiens in the First World War
Bill Hatanaka	Canadian football	1954		chair of the Ontario Health agency's board of directors
W.J. Kent	businessman	1860	1943	founding alderman in Bathurst's first town council, mayor of Bathurst for two terms
Felix Roland "Rollie" Rossignol	ice hockey	1921	1981	former NHL forward and local businessman
Scott Smith	ice hockey	1966		president of Hockey Canada
Natasha St-Pier	singer	1981		francophone chart-topping singer

People from Campbellton
Name	Famous for	Birth	Death	Other
Brenda Best	music	1962		songwriter, ASCAP Nashville; inducted into the NBCMHF New Brunswick Country Music Hall of Fame (2015)
Roy Boudreau	politics	1946	2023	former MLA for Campbellton-Restigouche Centre in the Legislative Assembly of New Brunswick; president of the assembly
Byron Christopher	journalist	1949		print, radio, and television news reporter
Greg Davis	politics	1962		politician
Bill Dickie	sports	1916	1997	ice hockey goaltender
Rayburn Doucett	politics	1943		businessman and politician
Jean F. Dubé	politics	1962		former member of Parliament (Madawaska-Restigouche), former member of the Legislative Assembly of New Brunswick; member of the Parole Board of Canada
Patsy Gallant	singer	1948		popular singer and musical theatre actress
Chuck Guité	civil servant	1943		civil servant
John LeBlanc	sports	1964		former professional hockey player for the Winnipeg Jets, Vancouver Canucks and Edmonton Oilers
René Lévesque	politics	1922	1987	Parti québécois premier of Quebec
Peter Maher	sports	1949		sports broadcaster for the Calgary Flames; inducted into the Hockey Hall of Fame
John McAlister	politics	1842	1918	first mayor of Campbellton, 1888-1889
Bill Miller	sports	1908	1986	former professional hockey player for the Montreal Maroons
Frédéric Niemeyer	sports	1976		former professional tennis player
Mike Olscamp	politics			professor and politician
Gerry Ouellette	sports	1938	2025	former professional hockey player for the Boston Bruins and Campbellton Tigers; won three Hardy Cups
Allain Roy	sports	1970		1994 Canadian Olympian, won NCAA title with Harvard and drafted by the Winnipeg Jets
Nan Macpherson Smith	philanthropy		1940	leader in New Brunswick women’s activities, as well as patriotic, philanthropic, cultural, missionary, and benevolent projects in the Saint John area
John Stevens	sports	1966		former hockey head coach of the Philadelphia Flyers; current assistant coach of the Los Angeles Kings
J.C. Van Horne	politics	1921	2003	politician

People from Dieppe
Name	Famous for	Birth	Death	Description	Ref(s).
Fayo	music	1977	2024	songwriter, born in Dieppe	
Kamylle Frenette	sports	1996		paratriathlete, born and grew up in Dieppe	
Corinne Gallant	activism	1922	2018	professor, feminist activist, member of the Order of Canada	
Charlie Gillespie	acting	1998		actor, born in Dieppe	
Cy LeBlanc	politics	1955		businessman and politician, former MP for Dieppe Centre-Lewisville to the Legislative Assembly of New Brunswick, born in Dieppe	
Paul LeBlanc	makeup and hairstyling	1946	2019	Academy Award-winning hairstylist (Amadeus, Return of the Jedi, Black Swan)	
Raymond Guy LeBlanc	music	1945	2021	musician and poet, born in the Saint-Anselme area	
Bill Malenfant	politics	1929	2016	former mayor of Dieppe (1971–1977, 1983–1998)	

People from Edmundston
Name	Famous for	Birth	Death	Other
Joseph Bérubé	government service (judge and ombudsman)			Longest-serving ombudsman of New Brunswick (1976–1993).
Maurice Bolyer	music	1920	1978	banjo player who appeared on The Tommy Hunter Show
Cédrick Desjardins	sports	1985		hockey goaltender, plays for the Tampa Bay Lightning affiliate in the AHL
Dave Hilton, Sr.	sports	1940	2023	professional boxer who won a Canadian championship in three different weight divisions
Ty LaForest	sports	1917	1947	Major League Baseball player who played with the Boston Red Sox
John Carl Murchie	military	1895	1966	Commander of the Canadian Army from 1943 to 1945
Maryse Ouellet	sports	1983		professional wrestler and former two-time WWE Divas Champion
Natasha St-Pier	music	1981		singer, better known in France
Shawn Sawyer	sports	1985		figure skater, finished 12th overall at the XXth Winter Olympics held in Turin, Italy
Bernard Valcourt	politics	1952		federal politician
Roch Voisine	music	1963		singer, actor (born and raised in St-Basile)

People from Fredericton
Name	Famous for	Birth	Death	Other
Jake Allen	sports	1990		ice hockey goaltender, Stanley Cup winner
Lisa Alward	literature	1962		author
Rebecca Agatha Armour	literature	1845	1891	novelist and schoolteacher who lived almost her whole life in the town
John Babbitt	science	1845	1889	built the first working phonograph in New Brunswick
R. E. Balch	academics	1894	1994	entomologist
Gerard Beirne	literature	1962		author, fiction editor of The Fiddlehead
J. W. "Bud" Bird	politics	1932		provincial cabinet minister and member of the House of Commons of Canada
Bruno Bobak	art	1923	2012	painter, Canadian official war artist
Molly Lamb Bobak	art	1920	2014	painter,Canadian official war artist
Measha Brueggergosman	opera	1977		operatic soprano
Bliss Carman	literature	1861	1929	poet
Eilish Cleary	medicine	1963	2024	physician, epidemiologist, chief medical health officer of New Brunswick
David Coon	politics	1956		conservationist, politician, Leader of the Green Party of New Brunswick
Herb Curtis	literature	1949		author
Mike Eagles	sports	1963		former NHL player
Raymond Fraser	literature	1941	2018	author
Julia O. Henson	activism	1852	1922	co-founder of the NAACP and the Harriet Tubman house in Boston
Mark Anthony Jarman	literature	1955		author, fiction editor of The Fiddlehead
Gérard La Forest	law	1926	2025	puisne justice of the Supreme Court of Canada
Hugh Havelock McLean	politics	1854	1938	general, politician, lieutenant governor of New Brunswick
Hal Merrill	sports	1964		three-time bronze medalist at the Paralympic Games, two in the 1992 Summer Paralympics and one in the 1996 Summer Paralympics
David Myles	music	1981		musician
Alden Nowlan	literature	1933	1983	poet, playwright, journalist
Willie O'Ree	sports	1935		first Black NHL player
David Adams Richards	literature	1950		author, senator
Charles G. D. Roberts	literature	1860	1943	poet, the "father of Canadian poetry"
Goodridge Roberts	art	1904	1974	painter, Canadian official war artist
Theodore Goodridge Roberts	literature	1877	1953	author
Elizabeth Roberts MacDonald	literature	1864	1922	author, suffragette
John Saunders	politics	1754	1834	chief justice on N.B. Supreme Court
Andy Scott	politics	1955	2013	Minister of Indian Affairs and Northern Development
Anna Silk	television	1974		actor, starred as Bo Dennis on Lost Girl
Matt Stairs	sports	1968		Major League Baseball player

People from Miramichi
Name	Famous for	Birth	Death	Other
Max Aitken	politics	1879	1964	1st Baron Beaverbrook, business tycoon, politician, writer and philanthropist
Richard Bedford Bennett	politics	1870	1947	1st Viscount Bennett, 11th prime minister of Canada, practised law there
George P. Burchill	politics	1889	1977	shipbuilding and lumber operations, Senator of Canada 1945–1977
Martin Cranney		1795	1870	pioneer Irish leader on the Miramichi
Joseph Cunard		1799	1865	politician, shipbuilder and businessman; former MLA; brother of Samuel Cunard
William Davidson		1740	1790	first permanent English-speaking resident businessman, shipbuilder, politician, MLA
Nicolas Denys		1598?	1688	with his son Richard Denys, pioneer fur traders
Jason Dickson		1973		former baseball player
Yvon Durelle		1929	2007	British Empire Light Heavyweight Boxing Champion
Tyson Dux	pro wrestler	1978		former TNA wrestler
Frances Fish		1888	1975	
Raymond Fraser	author	1941	2018	author and poet
James Gilmour		1782	1858	
Alfred A. Green	politician	1828	1899	early California pioneer
Richard Hutchison		1812	1891	businessman, former MLA and member of Parliament
W. S. Loggie		1850	1944	politician and businessman
Brad Malone		1989		ice hockey player
Greg Malone		1956		former ice hockey player
Jim Malone		1962		former ice hockey player
Louise Manny		1890	1970	folklorist and historian
Frank McKenna		1948		businessman and politician, former premier of NB, former ambassador to the United States
George Roy McWilliam		1905	1977	longtime member of Parliament
Peter Mitchell		1824	1899	politician, Father of Confederation, former premier of NB (as a British province) and MP
Joseph Leonard O'Brien		1895	1973	politician and businessman, former lieutenant-governor
Anne Quinlan	educator	1839	1923	head of St. Michael's Academy
John Ralston	actor	1964		"George Venturi" from Life with Derek
Alexander Rankin		1788	1852	politician and businessman
David Adams Richards	author	1950		writer
James Rogers		1826	1903	bishop
Duane Rousselle	educator, psychoanalyst	1982		educator, author, activist, and psychoanalyst
Joseph Russell		1786	1855	former shipbuilder
Valerie Sherrard	author	1957		author
Jabez Bunting Snowball	politician	1837	1907	politician and businessman, former lieutenant-governor
Lemuel John Tweedie	politician	1849	1917	politician and lawyer, former premier and lieutenant-governor of NB
Quinson Valentino	professional wrestler	1970		former international pro wrestling star
Kevin Vickers		1956		sergeant-at-arms of the House of Commons
Michael Whelan	poet	1858	1937	poet
Arnott Whitney	ice hockey player	1931	2024	

People from Moncton
Name	Famous for	Birth	Death	Other
Michel Bastarache	government	1947		justice of the Supreme Court of Canada
Claudette Bradshaw	government	1949	2022	former federal Minister of Labour (1998–2004)
George Carroll	athlete	1897	1939	NHL defenceman
Herménégilde Chiasson	government	1946		artist, academic, lieutenant governor of New Brunswick 2003–2009
Reuben Cohen	business	1921	2014	lawyer and business magnate
Phil Comeau	film director	1956		directed first theatrical Acadian feature Le secret de Jérôme (Jerome's Secret)
Rhéal Cormier	athlete	1967	2021	baseball player
France Daigle	Acadian novelist	1953		winner of the Governor General's Literary Prize for French fiction in 2012
Michael de Adder	cartoonist	1967		political cartoonist
Holly Elissa Dignard	thespian	1979		film actor
Julie Doiron	musician	1972		indie rock musician with Eric's Trip
Gordie Drillon	athlete	1913	1986	hockey player
Allison Dysart	government	1880	1962	premier of New Brunswick (1935–1940)
Henry Emmerson	government	1853	1914	premier of New Brunswick (1897–1900), federal Minister of Railways and Canals (1904–1907)
Sandy Ferguson	athlete	1879	1919	heavyweight boxer; fought Jack Johnson five times
Sheree Fitch	writer	1956		children's author
René-Arthur Fréchet	architect	1879	1950	originally from Montreal
Ray Frenette	government	1935	2018	premier of New Brunswick (1997–1998)
Northrop Frye	writer	1912	1991	literary critic and academic; continues to be a prominent figure in Moncton culture, with The Frye Festival, an annual literary festival, bearing his name
Brian Gallant	government	1982		premier of New Brunswick (2014–2018)
Daniel Gaudet	athlete	1959		represented Canada in artistic gymnastics at the 1984 Summer Olympics in Los Angeles
Russ Howard	athlete	1956		two-time world champion and Olympic gold medalist men's curler
Don Jardine	professional wrestler	1940	2006	known as "The Spoiler" and "The Super Destroyer"; trainer of WWE wrestler The Undertaker
Travis Jayner	athlete	1982		Olympic bronze and World Championship silver medal-winning short track speed skater
Sami Landry	drag artist and social media personality	1998/1999		
Sonja Lang	linguist	c. 1978		linguist and translator, creator of the conlang Toki Pona
Gérald Leblanc	writer	1945	2005	author and poet
Roméo LeBlanc	government	1927	2009	former federal Minister of Fisheries, senator and speaker of the Canadian Senate; governor-general of Canada (1995–1999)
Bill "Spaceman" Lee	athlete	1946		American pro baseball pitcher; played four years with the Moncton Mets (1984–1987)
Viola Léger	thespian	1930	2023	stage actress and retired Canadian senator, known for her role as La Sagouine
James E. Lockyer	government	1949		law professor and former New Brunswick Minister of Justice
Bernard Lord	government	1965		premier of New Brunswick (1999–2006)
Roger Lord	musician			professional pianist, brother of former premier Bernard Lord
Antonine Maillet	writer	1929	2025	novelist, recipient of the Prix Goncourt, the highest honour in francophone literature
Robert Maillet	thespian	1969		film actor, played "Uber Immortal" in 300; played "Dredger" in 2009's Sherlock Holmes
Frank McKenna	government	1948		premier of New Brunswick (1987–1997), former Canadian ambassador to the United States
Matt Minglewood	musician	1947		rock musician
Terry Moore	athlete	1958		soccer player; NASL, Irish League, Olympics, played for Canada at the 1986 World Cup
James Alexander Murray	government	1864	1960	premier of New Brunswick (1917)
Marg Osburne	musician	1927	1977	country and gospel singer, television and radio personality; featured on Don Messer's Jubilee and That Maritime Feeling
Mike Plume	musician	1968		country singer
Ivan Rand	government	1884	1969	justice of the Supreme Court of Canada; creator of the Rand formula, which allows union dues to be automatically subtracted from workers' salaries; member of the UNSCOP, which oversaw the partition of Palestine in 1947
Brenda Robertson	government	1929	2020	first female member of the New Brunswick legislature, first female cabinet minister in New Brunswick, Canadian senator (1984–2004)
Clifford William Robinson	government	1866	1944	premier of New Brunswick (1907–1908), Canadian senator
George Steeves	writer	c. 1945		contemporary photographer
Frederick W. Sumner	merchant and political figure	1855	1919	merchant and political figure in New Brunswick
Robb Wells	thespian	1971		comic actor, played "Ricky" on TV's Trailer Park Boys
Rick White	musician	1970		indie rock musician (Eric's Trip, Elevator)
Jasper Wood	musician	1974		concert violinist

People from Riverview
Full name	Known for	Birth	Death	Other
Charles Foster	Writer	1923	2017	
Travis Jayner	Sports	1982		
Michael LeBlanc	Sports	1987		
Mike Miller	Sports	1989		
Jordan Murray	Sports	1992		
Todd Smith	Politics	1971		
Yvette Victoria Angela Swan	Minister	1945	2021	

People from Saint John

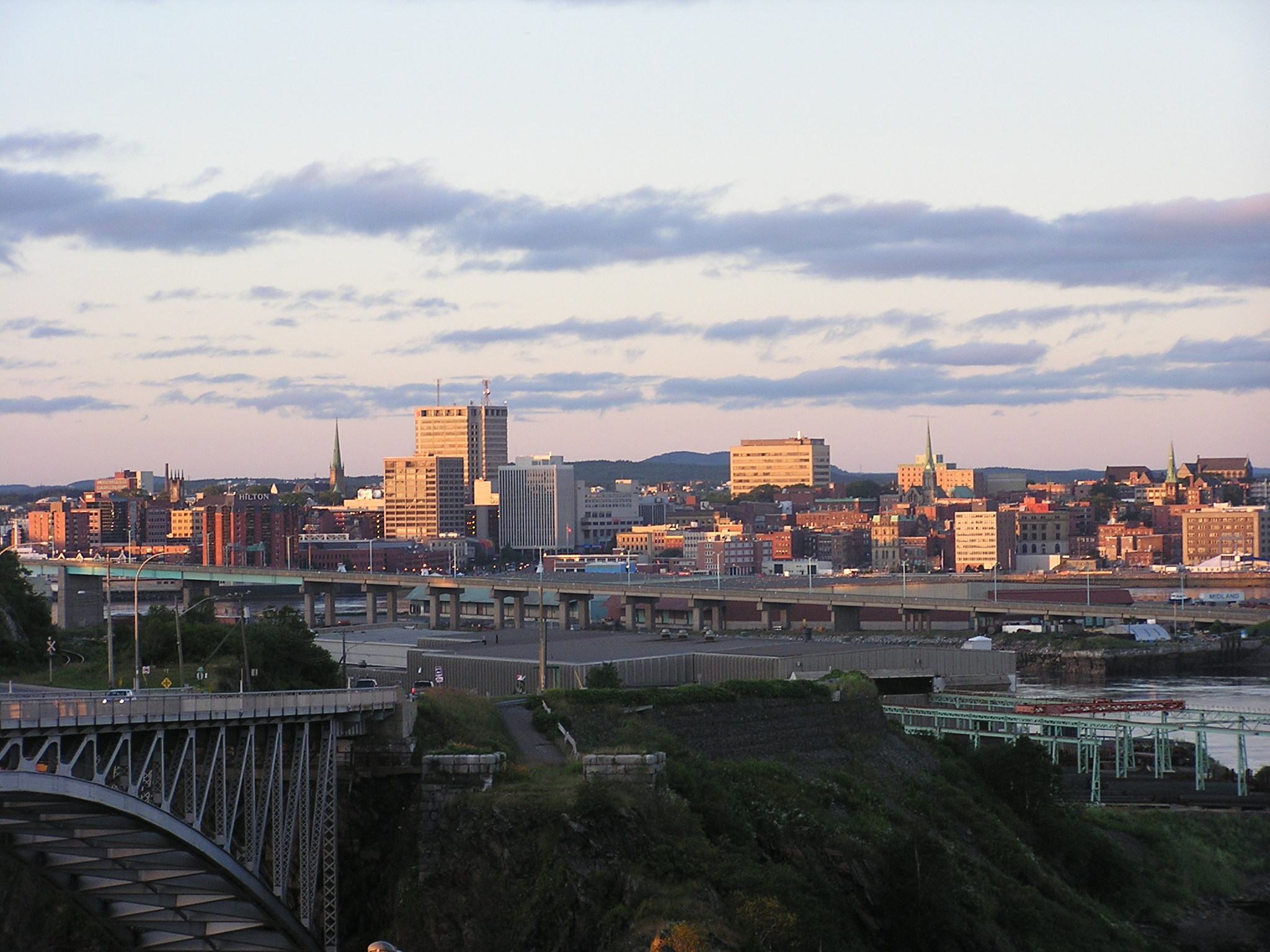
Saint John skyline

The following is a list of notable people who were born or have lived in Saint John, New Brunswick.

== A ==
- John Adams (born 1942) – former Canadian Armed Forces member
- Robert M. Allan (1880–?) – American politician; Los Angeles City Council member
- John Allore (1964–2023) – actor, victims' rights advocate, podcaster, brother of murder victim Theresa Allore
- Aaron Alward (1828–1886) – physician, politician; city councillor, mayor and MLA
- Francis Alexander Anglin (1865–1933) – chief justice of Canada 1924–1933
- Timothy Anglin (1822–1896) – Irish-born journalist, MLA, Speaker of the House of Commons
- Jennifer Armstrong (born 1992) – curler
- Clara Arthur (1858–1929) – American suffragist based in Michigan

== B ==
- Brent Bambury (born 1960) – Canadian Broadcasting Corporation radio and television host
- Blank Banshee (born 1987) – musician
- J. Esmonde Barry (1923–2007) – healthcare activist and political commentator
- Michael Barry (born 1954) – Olympic wrestler
- Patricia Martin Bates (born 1927) – artist, educator
- John Babington Macaulay Baxter (1868–1946) – lawyer, jurist, 19th premier of New Brunswick
- Arthur Belyea (1885–1968) – Olympic rower
- Helen Belyea (1913–1986) – geologist
- Craven Langstroth Betts (1853–1941) – poet, author
- Jared Bezanson (born 1986) – curler
- Andy Bezeau (born 1970) – professional ice hockey player
- Carl Biddiscombe (1924–2000) – set decorator
- Vaughn Blaney (born 1938) – former educator and politician
- Jonathan Bliss (1742–1822) – American-born lawyer, judge, politician; MLA
- John Boyd (1826–1893) – Irish-born businessman, school board chairman, lieutenant governor of New Brunswick
- Jane Boyle (born 1973) – curler
- Miller Brittain (1912–1968) – visual artist
- George Butterfield (born 1939) – businessman, philanthropist
- Mather Byles (1734/35–1814) – Loyalist, clergyman

== C ==
- Laura Calder – writer
- William A. Calvin (1898–1962) – labor union leader
- Robert H. Carlin (1887–1953) – politician, MLA
- Dyson Carter (1910–1996) – scientist, writer, political activist; president of the Canadian-Soviet Friendship Society
- Andrew Case (born 1993) – baseball pitcher
- Charlie Cavanagh (born 2000) – former boxer
- Kevin Chase (born 1976) – wrestler, singer-songwriter
- John Alexander Chesley (1837–1922) – businessman, politician; city councillor, mayor, member of Canadian Parliament
- Ward Chipman Jr. (1787–1851) – lawyer, judge, pre-Confederation politician
- Gordie Clark (born 1952) – Scottish-born former ice hockey player for the Boston Bruins and the Cincinnati Stingers
- Robert J. Coffey (1842–1901) – soldier
- Charles Collingwood (born 1943) – British actor
- Gerard Collins (born 1957) – painter
- Anne Compton (born 1947) – poet, anthologist
- Eddie Connolly (1876–1936) – boxer
- Thomas-Louis Connolly (1814–1876) – bishop of Saint John
- Stompin' Tom Connors (1936–2013) – country and folk singer-songwriter
- Jane Coop (born 1950) – pianist
- Paul Corkum (born 1943) – physicist
- Ivan Court – former mayor of Saint John
- William Cox (1921–2008) – lawyer
- Jordon Craft (born 1993) – curler
- Maxwell Cummings (1898–2001) – real estate builder
- Nathan Cummings (1896–1985) – businessman
- Louis Cunningham (1900–1954) – author
- Louis Cuppens (1944–2022) – Royal Canadian Air Force officer, NORAD deputy commander
- Richard Currie (born 1937) – businessman

== D ==
- William H. Dabney (1934–2012) – colonel in the United States Marine Corps
- Tom Daly (1891–1946) – Major League Baseball player and coach
- John Waterhouse Daniel (1845–1933) – physician, politician; mayor of Saint John, member of Canadian Parliament and Senator
- Don Darling – former mayor of Saint John
- Joseph A. Day (born 1945) – former politician, senator
- James De Mille (1833–1880) – novelist, professor at Dalhousie University
- Jeremiah Smith Boies De Veber (1829–1908) – businessman, politician; mayor of Saint John, member of Canadian Parliament
- James Dever (1825–1904) – Irish-born merchant and Canadian senator
- Edward I. Devitt (1840–1920) – priest, Jesuit, Catholic historian
- Paul Dobson (born 1979) – curler
- Margaret Doody (born 1939) – author, feminist literary critic, professor at the University of Notre Dame
- Harry Doyle (born 1941) – former educator and MLA
- William Mark Duke (1879–1971) – prelate

== E ==
- Lawrence Earl (1915–2005) – photojournalist, author
- Sylvester Zobieski Earle (1822–1888) – physician, coroner, politician; mayor of Saint John
- Eldridge Eatman (1880–1960) – sprinter, First World War soldier
- Jerrod Edson (born 1974) – novelist
- Stanley Edward Elkin (1880–1960) – businessman, politician, House of Commons of Canada member
- John Valentine Ellis (1835–1913) – journalist, parliamentarian, senator
- Angelo Evelyn (born 1942) – painter

== F ==
- Roxanne Fairweather – businesswoman, co-CEO of Innovatia
- Harold Fanjoy (1939–2008) – politician
- Mark Fawcett (born 1972) – Olympic snowboarder
- May Agnes Fleming (1840–1880) – novelist
- Myra Freeman (born 1949) – teacher, politician; first female lieutenant governor of Nova Scotia
- Ryan Freeze (born 1995) – curler
- Madeleine Fritz (1896–1990) – paleontologist

== G ==
- Susan B. Ganong (1873–1961) – educator
- William Francis Ganong (1864–1941) – botanist, historian, cartographer, Smith College professor
- Ian Gardner (born 1981) – boxer
- Mort Garson (1924–2008) – electronic musician
- Abraham Pineo Gesner (1797–1864) – physician, geologist, inventor of kerosene
- Bradford Gilbert (ca. 1746–1814) – Loyalist merchant, MLA
- Charles Gorman (1898–1940) – top-ranking speed skater
- Hilliard Graves (born 1950) – former professional ice hockey player
- Philippe Guertin (born 1991) – long-distance swimmer

== H ==
- Heidi Hanlon (born 1958) – curler
- Elisabeth Harvor (born 1936) – novelist, poet
- Gavin Hassett (born 1973) – Olympic rower
- William C. Heine (1919–1991) – newspaper writer, author, University of Western Ontario journalism teacher
- Anna Minerva Henderson (1887–1987) – teacher, poet, civil servant
- Paul Higgins (born 1962) – former professional ice hockey player for the Toronto Maple Leafs
- Fred Hodges (1918–1999) – labour leader, civil rights activist, city councillor
- Bruce Holder (1905–1987) – violinist
- Thomas Holderness (1849–1924) – Indian Civil Service member
- John J. Holland (1843–1893) – shipbuilder
- Stuart Howe (born 1967) – operatic tenor
- William Lloyd Hoyt (born 1930) – lawyer, judge; chief justice of New Brunswick, member of the Bloody Sunday Inquiry
- Stephen Humbert (ca. 1766–1849) – merchant, politician
- Jack Humphrey (1901–1967) – watercolour painter
- John Horbury Hunt (1838–1904) – Australian architect

== I ==
- Arthur Irving (1930–2024) – billionaire businessman, owner of Irving Oil
- John E. Irving (1932–2010) – businessman
- Jay Isaac (born 1975) – artist

== J ==
- Frances James (1903–1988) – soprano
- Kim Jardine (born 1966) – politician
- Edward James Jarvis (1788–1852) – politician, lawyer, judge; chief justice of Prince Edward Island
- Munson Jarvis (1742–1824) – American-born merchant, MLA
- Ryan Jimmo (1981–2016) – mixed martial artist
- Gina Jordan (1929–2013) – pilot and Christian missionary
- Bob Joyce (born 1966) – former professional ice hockey player

== K ==
- Herzl Kashetsky (born 1950) – painter
- Jackie Keating (1908–1984) – professional ice hockey player for the New York Americans
- Ethel Knight Kelly (1875–1949) – Australian actress, writer
- Flora Kidd (1926–2008) – romance novelist
- Carl Killen – former politician, city councillor and MLA
- George Edwin King (1839–1901) – lawyer, politician; second and fourth premier of New Brunswick, puisne justice of the Supreme Court of Canada

== L ==
- Mark Lackie (born 1967) – Olympic speed skater
- Thomas Leavitt (1795–1850) – businessman, banker, president of the Bank of New Brunswick
- Abel LeBlanc (born 1934/1935) – politician
- Colin H. Livingstone (1863–1943) – banker, businessman, first national president of the Boy Scouts of America
- Bob Lockhart (1931–2023) – radio journalist, news director, mayor of Saint John
- Charles B. Lockhart (1855–1948) – merchant, politician; MLA and city councillor
- Willy Logan (1907–1955) – Olympic speed skater
- Wayne Long (born 1963) – politician, member of Parliament for the riding of Saint John—Rothesay
- Gerry Lowe – politician; city councillor and MLA

== M ==
- David Laurence MacLaren (1893–1960) – politician; Minister of National Revenue, 20th lieutenant governor of New Brunswick and mayor of Saint John
- Kevin MacMichael (1951–2002) – guitarist, original Cutting Crew band member
- Sarah Mallais (born 1989) – curler
- Margo Malowney (born 1967) – Olympic beach volleyball player
- Laurence Manning (1899–1972) – science fiction author
- Frederick Francis Mathers (1871–1947) – 18th lieutenant governor of Nova Scotia
- Matty Matheson (born 1982) – chef, restauranteur, actor, internet personality
- George Frederick Matthew (1837–1923) – botanist, geologist
- William Diller Matthew (1871–1930) – vertebrate paleontologist, curator of the American Museum of Natural History
- Spencer Mawhinney (born 1977) – curler
- Louis B. Mayer (1884–1957) – American film producer, co-founder of Metro-Goldwyn-Mayer (MGM) studios
- William Maynes (1902–1966) – Olympic sprinter
- Shirley McAlary – politician, former mayor of Saint John
- Robert McAllister (1876–1963) – politician
- Norm McFarlane – politician, former mayor of Saint John
- Art McGovern (1882–1915) – catcher for the Boston Americans
- Dan McIntyre (1950–2001) – human rights activist, race relations commissioner for Ontario
- Jim McKeever (1861–1897) – catcher for the Boston Reds
- Neil McKelvey (1925–2011) – lawyer
- Andrew McKim (born 1970) – former professional ice hockey player
- Catherine McKinnon (born 1944) – singer, actress
- David McKnight (1935–2006) – anthropologist and ethnographer
- Joseph Medill (1823–1899) – newspaper editor and publisher
- Brian Merrett (1945–2023) photographer, architectural activist
- Gerald Merrithew (1931–2004) – federal, provincial and municipal politician
- Eleanor Milne (1935–2014) – sculptor
- Willard M. Mitchell (1879–1955) – artist, architect
- J. Frank Morrison (1841–1916) – Baltimore electric company founder and political boss
- Henry Mullin (1862–1937) – Major League Baseball outfielder
- James Mullinger (born 1978) – English-born comedian
- William Murdoch (1823–1887) – Scottish-born poet, journalist
- Jamie Murphy (born 1981) – curler
- Steve Murphy (born 1960) – news anchor
- Frances Elizabeth Murray (ca. 1831–1901) – writer, charity worker
- Billy Myers (1923–2019) – Canadian football player for the Toronto Argonauts

== N ==
- Arthur James Nesbitt (1880–1954) – businessman
- Saul B. Newton (1906–1991) – psychotherapist
- Neil Nicholson (born 1949) – former National Hockey League defenseman for the Oakland Seals and the New York Islanders
- Mel Norton – former mayor of Saint John
- Alden Nowlan (1933–1983) – poet, novelist, playwright, editor for the Telegraph-Journal

== O ==
- John O'Brien (1866–1913) – Major League Baseball player
- Bill O'Neill (1880–1920) – Major League Baseball outfielder
- Chauncey O'Toole (born 1986) – former rugby union player and firefighter
- Jordan Owens (born 1986) – former professional ice hockey player

== P ==
- George Pack Jr. (1794–1875) – businessman
- William Paine (1750–1833) – United Empire Loyalist physician, politician; city councillor and MLA
- Robert Parker (1796–1865) – lawyer, judge, politician
- John Richard Partelow (1795–1865) – merchant, politician; MLA and mayor of Saint John
- Robert J. Patterson (1809–1884) – former American slave, restauranteur
- Lawrence Paul (1934–2014) – Millbrook First Nation chief
- Bill Phillips (1857–1900) – professional baseball player
- George Frederick Phillips (1862–1904) – U.S. Navy machinist, Spanish–American War veteran
- Walter Pidgeon (1897–1984) – American stage and film actor
- Young Pluto (1872–1931) – South African-born Australian boxer
- John Alexander Porteous (1932–1995) – columnist, journalist, broadcaster
- Frank L. Potts (1867–1926) – mayor of Saint John

== Q ==
- Jim Quinn (born 1957) – former Saint John Port Authority president, politician; senator

== R ==
- Nelson Rattenbury (1907–1973) – businessman, member of the Senate of Canada
- Donna Reardon – current mayor of Saint John
- Helen Leah Reed (1861/62–1926) – writer
- Daniel Aloysius Riley (1916–1984) – politician; member of Parliament, MLA, and member of the Senate of Canada
- Robert J. Ritchie – politician
- Darren Roach (born 1986) – curler
- Jason Roach (born 1984) – curler
- John Robertson (1799–1876) – Scottish-born businessman, mayor of Saint John, member of the Senate of Canada
- John Robinson (1762–1828) – American-born merchant, mayor of Saint John, MLA
- Fred Ross (1927–2014) – artist
- W. E. D. Ross (1912–1995) – actor, playwright, writer
- William Ryan (1887–1938) – barrister, journalist, politician

== S ==
- Harry Saltzman (1915–1994) – theatre and film producer
- Jean-Claude Sawyer (born 1986) – former professional ice hockey player
- Carl Schell (1924–2020) – judoka
- Loretta Leonard Shaw (1872–1940) – teacher, missionary
- Ryan Sherrard (born 1986) – curler
- Charles Simonds (1783–1859) – merchant, politician, MLA
- James Simonds (1735–1831) – merchant, judge, MLA for Sunbury County, Nova Scotia and New Brunswick
- Richard Simonds (1789–1836) – merchant, politician, MLA
- Bernard Skinner (1930–2016) – sailor
- Chris Skinner (born 1961) – former Canadian Football League player
- Clara Kathleen Smith (1911–2004) – poet
- Elizabeth J. Smith (1842–1900) – American social reformer, newspaper editor and publisher
- Elmer Boyd Smith (1860–1943) – writer and illustrator of children's books
- Nan Macpherson Smith (d. 1940) leader in women’s activities, as well patriotic, philanthropic, cultural, missionary, and benevolent projects in the Saint John area
- Jack Stafford (1879–1946) – professional baseball umpire
- Matt Stairs (born 1968) – former Major League Baseball player
- Bob Stephen (1958–2009) – Canadian Football League player
- Charlie Sullivan (born 1968) – curler
- Jim Sullivan (1968–2011) – curler
- Donald Sutherland (1935–2024) – actor
- John Sweeny (1821–1901) – Irish-born priest and bishop of Saint John
- Andrew Swim (born 1961) – Olympic bobsledder

== T ==
- Glen Tait – politician; MLA and former city councillor
- Eric Teed (1926–2010) – lawyer, mayor of Saint John
- Nancy Teed (1949–1993) – politician; MLA, senator
- George McCall Theal (1837–1919) – South African historian
- Ralph Thomas – human rights activist and former boxer
- Fred W. Thompson (1900–1987) – labor organizer, historian
- William Henry Thorne (1844–1923) – businessman, politician; senator
- Leonard Percy de Wolfe Tilley (1870–1947) – lawyer, politician; 21st premier of New Brunswick
- Samuel Leonard Tilley (1818–1896) – politician; Father of Confederation
- Sue Tingley (born 1977) – field hockey player, Yale Bulldogs assistant
- Ken Tobias (1945–2024) – singer-songwriter
- Clark Todd (1944–1983) – London bureau chief for the CTV Television Network
- Peter Trites (1946–2010) – teacher, politician; MLA and city councillor
- Stuart Trueman (1911–1995) – journalist, humorist
- Walter Harley Trueman (1870–1951) – lawyer, judge
- Joseph John Tucker (1832–1914) – English-born politician, newspaper president and Saint John Railway Company director
- John E. Turnbull – inventor
- Wallace Rupert Turnbull (1870–1954) – engineer, inventor

== V ==
- Yvon Vautour (born 1956) – former ice hockey coach, former National Hockey League player
- R. M. Vaughan (1965–2020) – writer and artist
- Frank L. Vernon (1873–1944) – priest, author

== W ==
- Charles Caleb Ward (1831–1896) – painter
- John Ward (1753–1846) – loyalist, businessman, politician; MLA
- Lyman Ward (born 1941) – actor
- Kent Warnock (born 1964) – former Canadian football player, defensive line coach for the Calgary Dinos
- Elsie Wayne (1932–2016) – politician; mayor of Saint John and member of Parliament
- Carol Webb (born 1982) – curler
- Maestro Fresh Wes (born 1968) – rapper
- Walter W. White (1862–1952) – physician, politician; mayor of Saint John, MLA
- Rupert Wilson Wigmore (1873–1939) – politician
- John McNeil Wilmot (1775–1847) – American-born businessman, judge, politician; MLA, mayor of Saint John
- Robert Duncan Wilmot (1809–1891) – municipal, provincial and federal politician; mayor of Saint John, Father of Confederation
- Edward Winchester (1970–2020) – lightweight rower
- Hugh Winsor (born 1938) – journalist
- Michelle Winters (born 1972) – writer and translator
- Ardeth Wood (1975–2003) – murder victim
- Susan Wood (1953–2018) – artist, educator
- William J. Woodroffe (1933–2003) – politician; MLA and city councillor
- Gordon Wry (1910–1985) – tenor, conductor

== Y ==
- Heather Young – filmmaker

== Z ==
- Joseph Zatzman (1912–2007) – businessman, politician, mayor of Dartmouth, Nova Scotia

== See also ==
- List of people from New Brunswick

== By county ==
Click on the "people from..." link below to go to the full page of notable people, or click "show" next to each page to view the table within this page.

People from Albert County
Full name	Community	Famous for	Birth	Death	Other
R. B. Bennett	Hopewell Hill	politics	1870	1947	lawyer, businessman, politician, philanthropist, prime minister
W. A. C. Bennett	Hastings	politics	1900	1979	
John Coleman Calhoun		politics	1871	1950	
A. Russell Colpitts	Colpitts Settlement	politics	1906	2008	
Fred Colpitts	Colpitts Settlement	politics; business	1887	1963	fur farmer
Harry O. Downey	Curryville	politics	1897	1974	
Molly Kool	Alma	sea captain	1916	2009	
William James Lewis	Hillsborough	politics	1830	1910	
Malcolm MacLeod		politics			
Abner Reid McClelan	Riverside-Albert	politics	1831	1917	lieutenant-governor
Hugh McMonagle	Hillsborough	politics	1817	1889	
Neil McNeil	Hillsborough	religion	1851	1934	
Charles J. Osman	Hillsborough	politics	1851	1922	
George Robert Parkin	Parkindale	education	1846	1922	
Cyrus Wesley Peck	Hopewell Hill	military	1871	1956	Victoria Cross recipient
Freddie Prosser	Shenstone	wrestling	1938	1974	
James W. Reid	Harvey	architect	1851	1943	
Watson Elkinah Reid	Harvey	architect	1858	1944	
Wayne Steeves	Lower Coverdale	politics	1944		
William Steeves	Hillsborough	politics	1814	1873	
Claude D. Taylor	Edgetts Landing	politics	1911	1970	
Harold A. Terris		politics		2001	
Gaius S. Turner	Harvey	politics	1838	1892	
John D. Wallace		politics	1949		

People from Carleton County
Full name	Community	Famous for	Birth	Death	Other
Earle Avery	Woodstock	harness racing	1894	1977	Canada & U.S. Hall of Fame
Robert Begg	Florenceville	researcher	1914	1982	
Dianne Brushett	Bath	researcher	1942		
Fred Cogswell	East Centreville	poet	1917	2004	
Charles Connell	Northampton	politics	1810	1873	
Frank Copp	Bristol	judge	1881	1959	
Horace Victor Dalling	Richmond	inventor	1854	1931	
Aida McAnn Flemming	Victoria Corner	premier's wife	1896	1944	wife of Hugh John Flemming
Hugh John Flemming	Peel	premier of New Brunswick	1899	1982	
Myles Goodwyn	Woodstock	musician	1948		frontman of April Wine
Richard Hatfield	Hartland	premier of New Brunswick	1931	1991	Canadian senator
Harrison McCain	Florenceville	entrepreneur	1927	2004	
Wallace McCain	Florenceville	entrepreneur	1930	2011	
Andy Tommy	Hartland/Woodstock	Pro Football player	1911	1972	

People from Charlotte County
Full name	Community	Notable for	Birth	Death	Other
James Brown		politician			
Norman Buchanan (MC)	St. Stephen	military	1915	2008	member of the New Brunswick Sports Hall of Fame, politician, businessman
George Johnson Clarke		politician			lawyer, journalist, and politician, premier of New Brunswick 1914–1917
J. Howard Crocker	St. Stephen	educator and sports executive	1870	1959	physical education director for the YMCA and University of Western Ontario, executive with the Amateur Athletic Union of Canada and the Canadian Olympic Committee
Gilbert Ganong	Springfield	co-founder of Ganong Bros. Limited	1851	1917	lieutenant governor of New Brunswick
Hardy N. Ganong	St. Stephen	sportsman, soldier, businessman	1890	1963	
Alexander Gibson	Oak Bay, New Brunswick	industrialist	1819	1913	founder of Marysville
Arthur Hill Gillmor		politician			member of the Canadian House of Commons and Senate
Richard Hanson	Bocabec, Charlotte County, New Brunswick	politician	1879	1948	
Henry Irwin		politician			
James Charles McKeagney		politician			lawyer, politician, and judge
Alfred Needler					scientist, administrator, diplomat and statesman
Benjamin Robert Stephenson		politician			lawyer and politician
George Dixon Street		politician			lawyer, judge and political figure
A. Wesley Stuart					commercial fisherman and politician
Don Sweeney	St. Stephen	hockey player	1966		
David Walker	St. Stephen	writer	1911	1992	born in Scotland; two of his novels were made into feature films
Paul Watson					environmental activist

People from Gloucester County
Full Name	Community	Famous for	Birth	Death	Other
Renée Blanchar	Caraquet	Filmmaker	1964		
Luc Bourdon	Shippagan	Athlete	1987	2008	NHL player
Jean-François Breau	Tracadie	Musician	1978		Acadian singer
Edith Butler	Hautes-Terres	Musician	1942		Acadian singer
Herménégilde Chiasson	Saint-Simon	Poet	1946		29th Lieutenant Governor of New Brunswick
Tom Culligan	Belledune	Businessman	1945		co-founder of the Second Cup franchise company
Mathieu Duguay	Lamèque	Musician	1937		Founder and longtime artistic director of the Lamèque International Baroque Music Festival
Jason Godin	Maisonnette	Politics	1993		Mayor of Maisonnette since 2012 and NDP candidate for the riding of Acadie-Bathurst in 2015 federal election
Wilfred LeBouthillier	Tracadie	Musician	1978		Acadian singer and 2003 winner of Star Academie (a Quebec reality show for aspiring singers)
Denis Losier	Tracadie	Politician	1952		New Brunswick Liberal MLA (Tracadie) and Minister from 1988 to 1994
Rose-Marie Losier-Cool	Tracadie	Politician	1937		Senator 1995–2012
Serge Rousselle	Tracadie	Politics	19xx		New Brunswick Attorney General; Minister of Education and Early Childhood Development; Liberal MLA for the riding of Tracadie-Sheila
Doug Young	Tracadie	Politician	1940		New Brunswick MLA from 1978–1983, New Brunswick Minister of Fisheries in 1987, Liberal MP and Minister from 1993–1997
Robert Young	Caraquet	Politician	1834	1904	great-uncle of Doug Young

People from Kent County
Full name	Community	Famous for	Birth	Death	Other
Joël Bourgeois	Grande-Digue	sports	1971		3000m steeplechase runner, gold medalist at the 1999 Pan American Games, silver medalist at the 2003 Pan American Games, and two time Olympian, in the 1996 and 2000 editions of the Games
Paul Dwayne	Bouctouche	singer-songwriter	1964	2024	
Christian Kit Goguen	Saint-Charles	singer-songwriter	1978		
K. C. Irving	Bouctouche	industrialist	1899	1992	
Bonar Law	Five Rivers	prime minister of the United Kingdom	1858	1923	First British prime minister born outside the British Isles
Antonine Maillet	Bouctouche	author	1929	2025	Prix Goncourt winner
Robert Maillet	Sainte-Marie-de-Kent	wrestler, actor	1969		
Mia Martina	Saint-Ignace	singer	1982		
Louis Robichaud	Champdoré	premier of New Brunswick	1925	2005	
Donald J. Savoie	Bouctouche	political analyst	1947		
Margery Ward	Bass River	politician	1942	1993	

People from Kings County
Name	Community	Famous for	Birth	Death	Other
Winston Bronnum	Sussex	Sculptor	1929	1991	
Chris Cummings	Norton	Country music singer	1975		
John Peters Humphrey	Hampton	Lawyer	1905	1995	diplomat, scholar and principal author of the Universal Declaration of Human Rights
Anna Ruth Lang	Nauwigewauk	Recipient of the Canadian Cross of Valour (1982)			
Hugh J. McCormick	Kennebecasis Island	Speed Skater	1854	1910	World professional speed skater 1890-1892
George McCready Price	Havelock	Creationist	1870	1963	
Anna McNulty	Grand Bay-Westfield	YouTuber	2002		

People from Madawaska County
Full name	Community	Famous for	Birth	Death	Other
Pius Michaud	St. Leonard	Politics	1870	1956	
Irénée Pelletier	Saint-Andre	Politics	1939	1994	
Joseph-Aurèle Plourde	Saint-François-de-Madawaska	Religion	1915	2013	
Jocelyne Saucier	Clair	Writer	1948	-	
Serge Patrice Thibodeau	Rivière-Verte	Writer	1959	-	
Natasha St-Pier	Saint-Hilaire	Singer	1981	-	
Bradly Nadeau	Saint-François-de-Madawaska	Hockey	2005	-	

People from Northumberland County
Full Name	Community	Famous for	Birth	Death	Other
Joe Mike Augustine	Metepenagiag Mi'kmaq Nation	Discoverer of the Augustine Mound	1911	1995	
Noah Augustine	Metepenagiag Mi'kmaq Nation	Native activist and former Chief	1971	2010	
R. B. Bennett	Chatham	Prime Minister of Canada	1870	1947	
Yvon Durelle	Baie-Ste-Anne	Boxer	1929	2007	
Lisa LeBlanc	Rosaireville	Singer-songwriter	1990		
Raymond Fraser	Black River-Hardwicke	Author	1941	2018	
Melissa Ann Shepard	Burnt Church	Criminal	1935		

People from Queens County
Full Name	Community	Famous for	Birth	Death	Other
Henry A. Austin	Scotchtown	Politics	1833	1911	
Elizabeth Brewster	Chipman	Author	1922	2012	
Marjorie Taylor Morell	Minto	Author of Of Mines and Men; 1995 recipient of United Nations Community Service Award	1918	2004	
Eldon Rathburn	Queenstown	Film composer	1916	2008	
Don Mogard	Hampstead	Boxer	1925	1994	

People from Restigouche County
Full name	Community	Known for	Birth	Death	Other
Pamela Palmater	Eel River	Mi'kmaq lawyer, professor, activist, author	1970		
Hubert Marcoux	Charlo	French-Canadian solo sailor and author	February 12, 1941	November 2009	
Guy Arseneault	Dalhousie	Former member of the House of Commons of Canada	May 11, 1952		
Gord Titcomb	Dalhousie	Ice hockey player in the WHA	September 3, 1953		
Marlène Boissonnault	Dundee	Ice hockey player in the PWHL	June 19, 1997		

People from Saint John County
Full Name	Community	Famous for	Birth	Death	Other
Judson Burpee Black	St. Martins	Physician	1842	1924	
Walter Edward Foster	St. Martins	Politics	1873	1947	

People from Sunbury County
Full name	Community	Notable for	Birth	Death	Other
Jenica Atwin	Oromocto	Politician (Member of Parliament)	1987		She ran as a provincial candidate under the Green Party ticket, in the 2018 general election.
Washington Atlee Burpee	Sheffield	Horticulturist	1858	1915	
Henry Emmerson	Maugerville	Lawyer	1853	1914	
August Ames	Maugerville	Pornographic film actor	1994	2017	

People from Victoria County
Full Name	Community	Famous for	Birth	Death	Other
Ron Turcotte	Drummond	Sports	1941		
Wayne Maunder	Four Falls	Actor	1937	2018	

People from Westmorland County
Full name	Community	Famous for	Birth	Death	Other
Léonce Cormier	Dorchester	wrestler	1948	2024	
Emile Goguen	Pointe-du-Chene	wrestler	1936	2023	
Douglas How	Dorchester	reporter and author	1919	2001	
K. V. Johansen	Sackville	writer	1968		
Roméo LeBlanc	Memramcook	governor-general of Canada	1927	2009	
Douglas Lochhead	Sackville	poet	1922	2011	
Fred Magee	Baie Verte	industrialist, political figure	1875	1952	
Arthur Motyer	Sackville	professor, author, playwright	1925	2011	
Charles G. D. Roberts	Westcock	poet	1860	1943	
Claude Roussel	Cap-Pelé	sculptor	1930	2025	

People from York County
Full name	Community	Famous for	Birth	Death	Other
Sarah Emma Edmonds	Magaguadavic	Soldier in the Union Army during the American Civil War	1841	1898	
Roland H. Hartley	Shogomoc	Governor of the U.S. state of Washington	1864	1952	
Casey LeBlanc	Nackawic-Millville	Singer	1987		
Adam Oliver		Lumberman, mill owner, contractor, and politician	1823	1882	
Dr. Chris Simpson	Nackawic-Millville	President of the Canadian Medical Association	1967		
Jake Thomas	Douglas	CFL defensive lineman and 107th Grey Cup champion	1990		
Edward Winslow	Kingsclear	United Empire Loyalist and co-founder of New Brunswick	1746/7	1815	
Matthew Wuest	Stanley	Reporter and creator of CapGeek	1979	2015	
Troy Brewer	Beaverdam	Vice President of Stores GUESS Inc.	1971		

== See also ==
- List of writers from New Brunswick
