= Lists of Canadians by city =

This is an index of various lists of people of Canadian municipalities.

== By notability ==
- Lists of Canadians

== By city ==
=== B ===
- Barrie (Ontario)
- Brampton (Ontario)
- Brantford (Ontario)
- Burlington (Ontario)
- Burnaby (British Columbia)

=== C ===
- Caledon (Ontario)
- Calgary (Alberta)
- Charlottetown (Prince Edward Island)
- Coquitlam (British Columbia)

=== D ===
- Dieppe (New Brunswick)
- Drummondville (Quebec)

=== E ===
- East York (Ontario)
- Edmonton (Alberta)
- Edmundston (New Brunswick)
- Etobicoke (Ontario)

=== F ===
- Fredericton (New Brunswick)

=== G ===
- Gatineau (Quebec)
- Greater Sudbury (Ontario)
- Guelph (Ontario)

=== H ===
- Halifax Regional Municipality (Nova Scotia)
- Hamilton (Ontario)

=== K ===
- Kelowna (British Columbia)
- Kenora (Ontario)
- Kingston (Ontario)

=== L ===
- Laval (Quebec)
- Lethbridge (Alberta)
- Lévis (Quebec)
- London (Ontario)
- Longueuil (Quebec)

=== M ===
- Markham (Ontario)
- Medicine Hat (Alberta)
- Mississauga (Ontario)
- Moncton (New Brunswick)
- Montreal (Quebec)
- Moose Jaw (Saskatchewan)

=== N ===
- North Bay (Ontario)

=== O ===
- Oakville (Ontario)
- Ottawa (Ontario)

=== P ===
- Peterborough (Ontario)
- Prince Albert (Saskatchewan)

=== Q ===
- Quebec City (Quebec)

=== R ===
- Regina (Saskatchewan)
- Richmond Hill (Ontario)

=== S ===
- St. Albert (Alberta)
- Saint John (New Brunswick)
- St. John's (Newfoundland and Labrador)
- Sarnia (Ontario)
- Saskatoon (Saskatchewan)
- Sault Ste. Marie (Ontario)
- Scarborough (Ontario)
- Sherbrooke (Quebec)

=== T ===
- Thunder Bay (Ontario)
- Toronto (Ontario)
- Trois-Rivières (Quebec)

=== V ===
- Vancouver (British Columbia)
- Vaughan (Ontario)
- Victoria (British Columbia)

=== W ===
- Windsor (Ontario)
- Winnipeg (Manitoba)
