= List of people from Campbellton, New Brunswick =

This is a list of notable people from Campbellton, New Brunswick. Although not everyone in this list was born in Campbellton, they all live or have lived there, and have had significant connections to the community.

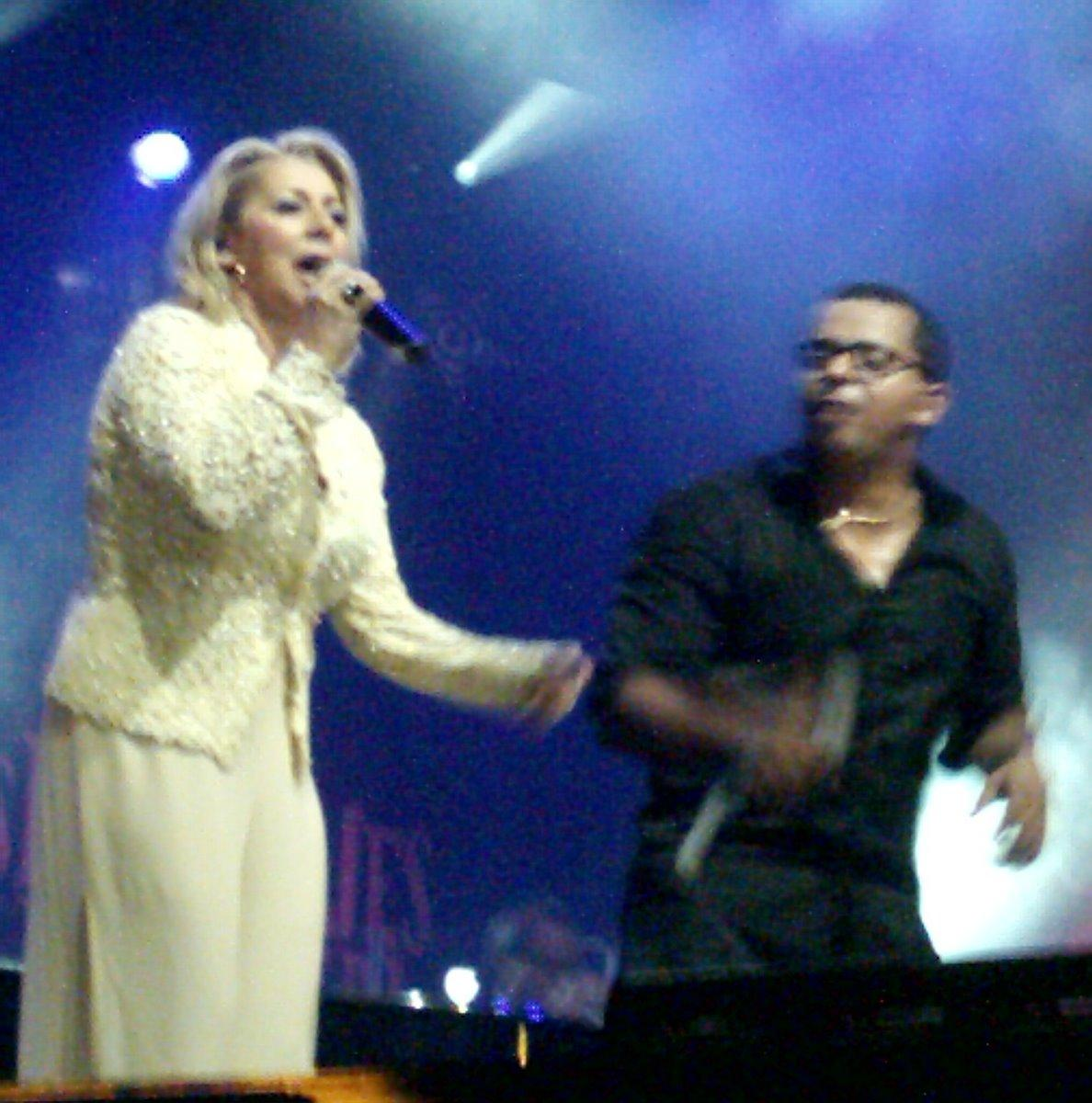
Juno Award-winning singer Patsy Gallant was born in Campbellton.

Name	Famous for	Birth	Death	Other
Brenda Best	music	1962		songwriter, ASCAP Nashville; inducted into the NBCMHF New Brunswick Country Music Hall of Fame (2015)
Roy Boudreau	politics	1946	2023	former MLA for Campbellton-Restigouche Centre in the Legislative Assembly of New Brunswick; president of the assembly
Byron Christopher	journalist	1949		print, radio, and television news reporter
Greg Davis	politics	1962		politician
Bill Dickie	sports	1916	1997	ice hockey goaltender
Rayburn Doucett	politics	1943		businessman and politician
Jean F. Dubé	politics	1962		former member of Parliament (Madawaska-Restigouche), former member of the Legislative Assembly of New Brunswick; member of the Parole Board of Canada
Patsy Gallant	singer	1948		popular singer and musical theatre actress
Chuck Guité	civil servant	1943		civil servant
John LeBlanc	sports	1964		former professional hockey player for the Winnipeg Jets, Vancouver Canucks and Edmonton Oilers
René Lévesque	politics	1922	1987	Parti québécois premier of Quebec
Peter Maher	sports	1949		sports broadcaster for the Calgary Flames; inducted into the Hockey Hall of Fame
John McAlister	politics	1842	1918	first mayor of Campbellton, 1888-1889
Bill Miller	sports	1908	1986	former professional hockey player for the Montreal Maroons
Frédéric Niemeyer	sports	1976		former professional tennis player
Mike Olscamp	politics			professor and politician
Gerry Ouellette	sports	1938	2025	former professional hockey player for the Boston Bruins and Campbellton Tigers; won three Hardy Cups
Allain Roy	sports	1970		1994 Canadian Olympian, won NCAA title with Harvard and drafted by the Winnipeg Jets
Nan Macpherson Smith	philanthropy		1940	leader in New Brunswick women’s activities, as well as patriotic, philanthropic, cultural, missionary, and benevolent projects in the Saint John area
John Stevens	sports	1966		former hockey head coach of the Philadelphia Flyers; current assistant coach of the Los Angeles Kings
J.C. Van Horne	politics	1921	2003	politician

== See also ==
- List of people from New Brunswick
