= List of people from Westmorland County, New Brunswick =

This is a list of notable people from Westmorland County, New Brunswick. Although not everyone in this list was born in Westmorland County, they all live or have lived in Westmorland County and have had significant connections to the communities.

This article does not include people from Moncton or people from Dieppe as they have their own sections.

Full name	Community	Famous for	Birth	Death	Other
Léonce Cormier	Dorchester	wrestler	1948	2024	
Emile Goguen	Pointe-du-Chene	wrestler	1936	2023	
Douglas How	Dorchester	reporter and author	1919	2001	
K. V. Johansen	Sackville	writer	1968		
Roméo LeBlanc	Memramcook	governor-general of Canada	1927	2009	
Douglas Lochhead	Sackville	poet	1922	2011	
Fred Magee	Baie Verte	industrialist, political figure	1875	1952	
Arthur Motyer	Sackville	professor, author, playwright	1925	2011	
Charles G. D. Roberts	Westcock	poet	1860	1943	
Claude Roussel	Cap-Pelé	sculptor	1930	2025	

== See also ==
- List of people from New Brunswick
