= List of people from Miramichi, New Brunswick =

This is a list of notable people from Miramichi, New Brunswick. Although not everyone in this list was born in Miramichi, they all live or have lived there, and have had significant connections to the community.

Name	Famous for	Birth	Death	Other
Max Aitken	politics	1879	1964	1st Baron Beaverbrook, business tycoon, politician, writer and philanthropist
Richard Bedford Bennett	politics	1870	1947	1st Viscount Bennett, 11th prime minister of Canada, practised law there
George P. Burchill	politics	1889	1977	shipbuilding and lumber operations, Senator of Canada 1945–1977
Martin Cranney		1795	1870	pioneer Irish leader on the Miramichi
Joseph Cunard		1799	1865	politician, shipbuilder and businessman; former MLA; brother of Samuel Cunard
William Davidson		1740	1790	first permanent English-speaking resident businessman, shipbuilder, politician, MLA
Nicolas Denys		1598?	1688	with his son Richard Denys, pioneer fur traders
Jason Dickson		1973		former baseball player
Yvon Durelle		1929	2007	British Empire Light Heavyweight Boxing Champion
Tyson Dux	pro wrestler	1978		former TNA wrestler
Frances Fish		1888	1975	
Raymond Fraser	author	1941	2018	author and poet
James Gilmour		1782	1858	
Alfred A. Green	politician	1828	1899	early California pioneer
Richard Hutchison		1812	1891	businessman, former MLA and member of Parliament
W. S. Loggie		1850	1944	politician and businessman
Brad Malone		1989		ice hockey player
Greg Malone		1956		former ice hockey player
Jim Malone		1962		former ice hockey player
Louise Manny		1890	1970	folklorist and historian
Frank McKenna		1948		businessman and politician, former premier of NB, former ambassador to the United States
George Roy McWilliam		1905	1977	longtime member of Parliament
Peter Mitchell		1824	1899	politician, Father of Confederation, former premier of NB (as a British province) and MP
Joseph Leonard O'Brien		1895	1973	politician and businessman, former lieutenant-governor
Anne Quinlan	educator	1839	1923	head of St. Michael's Academy
John Ralston	actor	1964		"George Venturi" from Life with Derek
Alexander Rankin		1788	1852	politician and businessman
David Adams Richards	author	1950		writer
James Rogers		1826	1903	bishop
Duane Rousselle	educator, psychoanalyst	1982		educator, author, activist, and psychoanalyst
Joseph Russell		1786	1855	former shipbuilder
Valerie Sherrard	author	1957		author
Jabez Bunting Snowball	politician	1837	1907	politician and businessman, former lieutenant-governor
Lemuel John Tweedie	politician	1849	1917	politician and lawyer, former premier and lieutenant-governor of NB
Quinson Valentino	professional wrestler	1970		former international pro wrestling star
Kevin Vickers		1956		sergeant-at-arms of the House of Commons
Michael Whelan	poet	1858	1937	poet
Arnott Whitney	ice hockey player	1931	2024	

== See also ==
- List of people from New Brunswick
