= List of people from York County, New Brunswick =

This is a list of notable people from York County, New Brunswick and Canada. Although not everyone in this list was born in York County, they all live or have lived in York County and have had significant connections to the communities.

This article does not include people from Fredericton, as they have their own section.

Full name	Community	Famous for	Birth	Death	Other
Sarah Emma Edmonds	Magaguadavic	Soldier in the Union Army during the American Civil War	1841	1898	
Roland H. Hartley	Shogomoc	Governor of the U.S. state of Washington	1864	1952	
Casey LeBlanc	Nackawic-Millville	Singer	1987		
Adam Oliver		Lumberman, mill owner, contractor, and politician	1823	1882	
Dr. Chris Simpson	Nackawic-Millville	President of the Canadian Medical Association	1967		
Jake Thomas	Douglas	CFL defensive lineman and 107th Grey Cup champion	1990		
Edward Winslow	Kingsclear	United Empire Loyalist and co-founder of New Brunswick	1746/7	1815	
Matthew Wuest	Stanley	Reporter and creator of CapGeek	1979	2015	
Troy Brewer	Beaverdam	Vice President of Stores GUESS Inc.	1971		

== See also ==
- List of people from New Brunswick
