= List of people from Madawaska County, New Brunswick =

This is a list of notable people from Madawaska County, New Brunswick, Canada. Although not everyone in this list was born in Madawaska County, they all live or have lived in Madawaska County and have had significant connections to the communities.

This article does not include people from Edmundston as they have their own section.

Full name	Community	Famous for	Birth	Death	Other
Pius Michaud	St. Leonard	Politics	1870	1956	
Irénée Pelletier	Saint-Andre	Politics	1939	1994	
Joseph-Aurèle Plourde	Saint-François-de-Madawaska	Religion	1915	2013	
Jocelyne Saucier	Clair	Writer	1948	-	
Serge Patrice Thibodeau	Rivière-Verte	Writer	1959	-	
Natasha St-Pier	Saint-Hilaire	Singer	1981	-	
Bradly Nadeau	Saint-François-de-Madawaska	Hockey	2005	-	

== See also ==
- List of people from New Brunswick
