= List of people from Northumberland County, New Brunswick =

This is a list of notable people from Northumberland County, New Brunswick. Although not everyone in this list was born in Northumberland County, they all live or have lived in Northumberland County and have had significant connections to the communities.

This article does not include People from Miramichi as they have their own section.

Full Name	Community	Famous for	Birth	Death	Other
Joe Mike Augustine	Metepenagiag Mi'kmaq Nation	Discoverer of the Augustine Mound	1911	1995	
Noah Augustine	Metepenagiag Mi'kmaq Nation	Native activist and former Chief	1971	2010	
R. B. Bennett	Chatham	Prime Minister of Canada	1870	1947	
Yvon Durelle	Baie-Ste-Anne	Boxer	1929	2007	
Lisa LeBlanc	Rosaireville	Singer-songwriter	1990		
Raymond Fraser	Black River-Hardwicke	Author	1941	2018	
Melissa Ann Shepard	Burnt Church	Criminal	1935		

== See also ==
- List of people from New Brunswick
