= List of people from Sunbury County, New Brunswick =

This is a list of notable people from Sunbury County, New Brunswick. Although not everyone in this list was born in Sunbury County, they all live or have lived in Sunbury County and have had significant connections to the communities.

This article does not include People from Fredericton as they have their own section.

Full name	Community	Notable for	Birth	Death	Other
Jenica Atwin	Oromocto	Politician (Member of Parliament)	1987		She ran as a provincial candidate under the Green Party ticket, in the 2018 general election.
Washington Atlee Burpee	Sheffield	Horticulturist	1858	1915	
Henry Emmerson	Maugerville	Lawyer	1853	1914	
August Ames	Maugerville	Pornographic film actor	1994	2017	

== See also ==
- List of people from New Brunswick
