= Joe Zanussi =

Canadian ice hockey player (1947–2025)

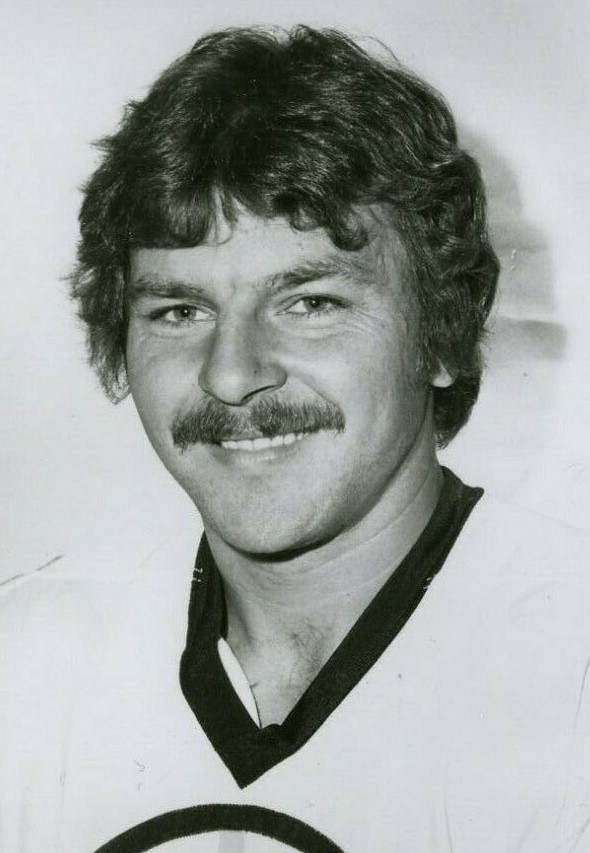
- Born: September 25, 1947 Rossland, British Columbia, Canada
- Died: 2025 (aged 76–77)
- Height: 5 ft 10 in (178 cm)
- Weight: 180 lb (82 kg; 12 st 12 lb)
- Position: Defence
- Shot: Right
- Played for: Winnipeg Jets; New York Rangers; Boston Bruins; St. Louis Blues
- NHL draft: Undrafted
- Playing career: 1968–1978

Joseph Lawrence Zanussi (September 25, 1947 – 2025) was a Canadian professional ice hockey player who played 149 games in the World Hockey Association and 87 games in the National Hockey League from 1972 to 1977. Zanussi's skating ability and agility earned him the nicknames 'Crazy Legs' and 'Tazmanian Devil' and although small for a pro hockey defenseman, Zanussi was a good bodychecker and possessed a big shot.

== Biography ==
Zanussi began his hockey career when Joe played for the Trail Juniors Smoke Eaters who were a BC Juvenile Finalist Team in 1964–65. The Detroit Red Wings Chief Western Scout, Clarence Moher noticed Zanussi at the finals and invited him to the Edmonton Oil Kings rookie camp in 1965–66. He spent that season with the Oil Kings Jr. B Red Wings. In the off-season of 1967–68 Zanussi was traded to the Swift Current Broncos of the WCJHL and became their first captain. That season he made the league's Second All-Star Team and was picked up by the Flin Flon Bombers to contend for the Memorial Cup against the Niagara Falls Flyers.

Although Zanussi's hockey rights were owned by the Detroit Red Wings, he subsequently went to training camp and was assigned to the Johnstown Jets of the EHL. Zanussi led his defensive corps in scoring in which he produced 56 points on 20 goals and 36 assists. He turned pro in 1969–70 and played with the Fort Worth Wings of the CPHL. His second year in Fort Worth saw him tie for the League's MVP award and a place on the Second All-Star Team, as well as the Sportsmanship and Best Defenseman Awards. The following year, 1971–72, a knee surgery caused Zanussi's career to be put on hold, but he was eventually signed by the Winnipeg Jets of the WHA. The Jets played in the League's Avco Cup Final in its inaugural year. In 1973–74 Zanussi finished was voted Most Exciting Player by Jets fans. His 3-year contract was then cut short, and his NHL rights were then owned by the New York Rangers by way of a trade with Detroit.

After the 1974-75 training camp Zanussi was designated to the Rhode Island Reds of the AHL. He was re-called to the Rangers on numerous occasions. Zanussi was the recipient of the Eddie Shore Award as the AHL's Best Defenseman, and was named to the First All-Star Team, and was runner up to the AHL's Les Cunningham Award as MVP. He also was named the Reds' team MVP and Best Defenseman. In 1975 he was traded to the Boston Bruins as part of a trade that also sent Brad Park and Jean Ratelle to Boston in exchange for Phil Esposito Zanussi scored his only NHL goal while with the Bruins, on February 1, 1976 in Boston's 5-3 win over the Atlanta Flames. Zanussi spent part of the year in the AHL, before being traded to the St. Louis Blues, who assigned him to the Kansas City Blues of the CPHL. Kansas City won the Adams Cup as CPHL champions that year. The following season Zanussi St. Louis' training camp, but was assigned to the Salt Lake Golden Eagles of the CPHL. He was named to the league's First All-Star Team and awarded the team's Best Defenseman Award. Zanussi led the AHL in scoring at the time, with 19 points through 11 games.

Zanussi died in 2025.

== Trades ==
May 24, 1972: Traded to the New York Rangers by the Detroit Red Wings along with the Red Wings first round choice in the 1972 draft (#10 overall, Rangers selected Al Blanchard) in exchange for Gary Doak and Rick Newell.

Nov. 7, 1975: Traded to the Boston Bruins by the New York Rangers along with Jean Ratelle and Brad Park in exchange for Phil Esposito and Carol Vadnais.

Dec. 20, 1976: Traded to the St. Louis Blues by the Boston Bruins in exchange for Rick Smith.

== Career statistics ==
=== Regular season and playoffs ===
			Regular season					Playoffs
Season	Team	League	GP	G	A	Pts	PIM	GP	G	A	Pts	PIM
1966–67	Edmonton Oil Kings	CMJHL	42	11	17	28	33	9	2	2	4	6
1967–68	Swift Current Broncos	WCHL	57	17	48	65	46	—	—	—	—	—
1968–69	Johnstown Jets	EHL	72	20	36	56	107	3	2	1	3	12
1969–70	Fort Worth Wings	CHL	56	4	9	13	65	7	1	0	1	16
1970–71	Fort Worth Wings	CHL	72	13	19	32	172	3	0	1	1	4
1971–72	Fort Worth Wings	CHL	48	4	24	28	69	7	0	1	1	18
1972–73	Winnipeg Jets	WHA	73	4	21	25	53	14	2	5	7	6
1973–74	Winnipeg Jets	WHA	76	3	22	25	53	4	0	0	0	0
1974–75	New York Rangers	NHL	8	0	2	2	4	—	—	—	—	—
1974–75	Providence Reds	AHL	64	22	36	58	76	3	1	0	1	4
1975–76	Providence Reds	AHL	11	8	11	19	29	—	—	—	—	—
1975–76	Boston Bruins	NHL	60	1	7	8	30	4	0	1	1	2
1975–76	Rochester Americans	AHL	2	0	1	1	2	—	—	—	—	—
1976–77	Boston Bruins	NHL	8	0	1	1	8	—	—	—	—	—
1976–77	Rochester Americans	AHL	17	1	9	10	18	—	—	—	—	—
1976–77	St. Louis Blues	NHL	11	0	3	3	4	—	—	—	—	—
1976–77	Kansas City Blues	CHL	30	4	14	18	26	10	2	2	4	14
1977–78	Salt Lake Golden Eagles	CHL	71	10	24	34	74	6	1	4	5	2
WHA totals			149	7	43	50	106	18	2	5	7	6
NHL totals			87	1	13	14	46	4	0	1	1	2

Preceded by Dan Johnson	CHL Most Valuable Player Award; 1970–71^{shared with Andre Dupont; Peter McDuffe; Gerry Ouellette}	Succeeded by Gregg Sheppard
