= List of people from Queens County, New Brunswick =

This is a list of notable people from Queens County, New Brunswick. Although not everyone in this list was born in Queens County, they all live or have lived in Queens County and have had significant connections to the communities.

Full Name	Community	Famous for	Birth	Death	Other
Henry A. Austin	Scotchtown	Politics	1833	1911	
Elizabeth Brewster	Chipman	Author	1922	2012	
Marjorie Taylor Morell	Minto	Author of Of Mines and Men; 1995 recipient of United Nations Community Service Award	1918	2004	
Eldon Rathburn	Queenstown	Film composer	1916	2008	
Don Mogard	Hampstead	Boxer	1925	1994	
