= List of people from Saint John County, New Brunswick =

This is a list of notable people from Saint John County, New Brunswick. Although not everyone in this list was born in Saint John County, they all live or have lived in Saint John County and have had significant connections to the communities.

This article does not include People from Saint John as they have their own section.

Full Name	Community	Famous for	Birth	Death	Other
Judson Burpee Black	St. Martins	Physician	1842	1924	
Walter Edward Foster	St. Martins	Politics	1873	1947	
James Quinton	Maugerville	Politics	1821	1874	

== See also ==
- List of people from New Brunswick
