= André Dupont =

Canadian ice hockey player (born 1949)

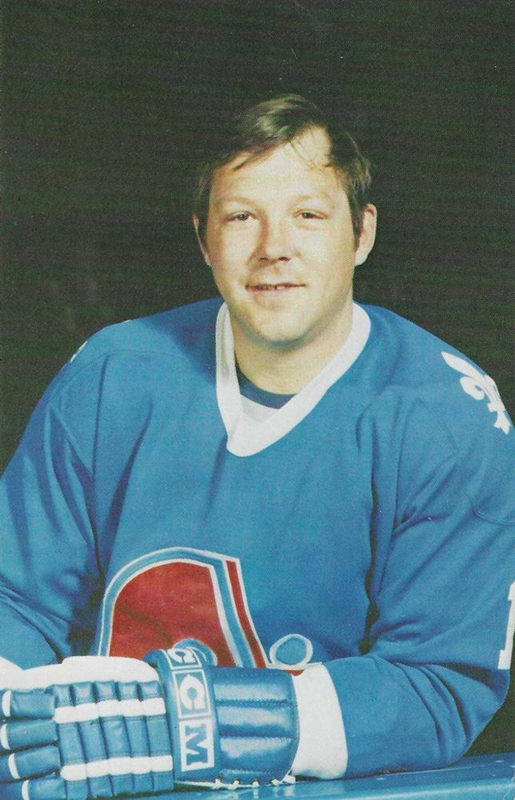
- Born: July 27, 1949 (age 76) Trois-Rivières, Quebec, Canada
- Height: 6 ft 1 in (185 cm)
- Weight: 200 lb (91 kg; 14 st 4 lb)
- Position: Defence
- Shot: Left
- Played for: New York Rangers; St. Louis Blues; Philadelphia Flyers; Quebec Nordiques
- NHL draft: 8th overall, 1969; New York Rangers
- Playing career: 1971–1983

André Dupont (born July 27, 1949) is a Canadian former professional ice hockey defenceman who played 13 seasons in the National Hockey League (NHL) with the New York Rangers, St. Louis Blues, Philadelphia Flyers and Quebec Nordiques. He won back-to-back Stanley Cups while a member of Philadelphia's "Broad Street Bullies" teams in the mid-1970s. He is most often referred to by his nickname "Moose".

== Playing career ==
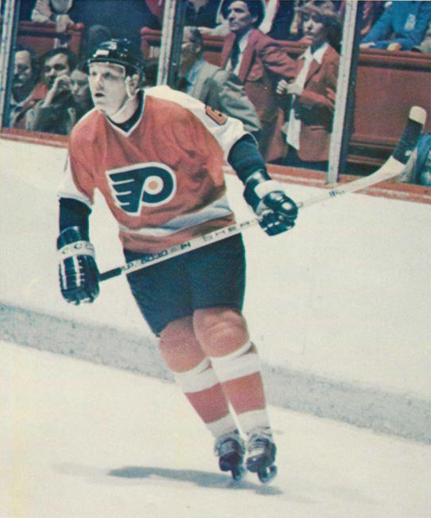
Andre Dupont in 1979/1980 photo for Philadelphia Flyers

As a youth, Dupont played in the 1961 Quebec International Pee-Wee Hockey Tournament with Trois-Rivières. He was drafted by the New York Rangers in the first round of the 1969 NHL Amateur Draft. He won a Memorial Cup in 1969 as a member of the Montreal Junior Canadiens. He was traded along with Jack Egers, Mike Murphy and a player to be named later to the St. Louis Blues for Gene Carr, Jim Lorentz and Wayne Connelly on November 15, 1971. He won the Stanley Cup as a member of the Flyers in 1974 and 1975. He retired in 1983.

On May 9, 1974, Dupont scored one of the most important goals in Philadelphia Flyers' history. With 52 seconds left in game two of the Stanley Cup final, he scored from the slot, beating Boston's Gilles Gilbert to level the game, 2-2. Philadelphia won the game in overtime and seized the momentum of the series. Ten days later, the Flyers won their first Stanley Cup.

His son, Danny Dupont, played junior hockey in the QMJHL. In 1994–95, he led the league in penalty minutes with 446 minutes, while playing for Halifax, Laval and Granby, all in one season. Danny turned to coaching and most recently was head coach of Acadie-Bathurst Titan (Bathurst NB) of the QMJHL.

== Career statistics ==
=== Regular season and playoffs ===
			Regular season					Playoffs
Season	Team	League	GP	G	A	Pts	PIM	GP	G	A	Pts	PIM
1965–66	Trois-Rivières Reds	QJHL	5	2	0	2	11	—	—	—	—	—
1966–67	Trois-Rivières Leafs	QJHL	45	5	24	29	310	14	2	7	9	52
1966–67	Thetford Mines Canadiens	MC	—	—	—	—	—	1	0	0	0	4
1967–68	Trois-Rivières Leafs	QJHL	—	—	—	—	—	4	0	7	7	10
1967–68	Verdun Maple Leafs	MC	—	—	—	—	—	5	0	1	1	10
1968–69	Montreal Junior Canadiens	OHA-Jr.	38	2	14	16	212	14	2	8	10	76
1968–69	Montreal Junior Canadiens	MC	—	—	—	—	—	8	2	3	5	39
1969–70	Omaha Knights	CHL	64	11	26	37	258	12	1	8	9	75
1970–71	New York Rangers	NHL	7	1	2	3	21	—	—	—	—	—
1970–71	Omaha Knights	CHL	54	15	31	46	308	11	0	7	7	45
1971–72	Providence Reds	AHL	18	1	8	9	95	—	—	—	—	—
1971–72	St. Louis Blues	NHL	60	3	10	13	147	11	1	0	1	20
1972–73	St. Louis Blues	NHL	25	1	6	7	51	—	—	—	—	—
1972–73	Philadelphia Flyers	NHL	46	3	20	23	164	11	1	2	3	29
1973–74	Philadelphia Flyers	NHL	75	3	20	23	216	16	4	3	7	67
1974–75	Philadelphia Flyers	NHL	80	11	21	32	216	17	3	2	5	49
1975–76	Philadelphia Flyers	NHL	75	9	27	36	276	15	2	2	4	46
1976–77	Philadelphia Flyers	NHL	69	10	19	29	214	10	1	1	2	35
1977–78	Philadelphia Flyers	NHL	69	2	12	14	225	12	2	1	3	13
1978–79	Philadelphia Flyers	NHL	77	3	9	12	135	8	0	0	0	17
1979–80	Philadelphia Flyers	NHL	58	1	7	8	107	19	0	4	4	50
1980–81	Quebec Nordiques	NHL	63	5	8	13	93	1	0	0	0	0
1981–82	Quebec Nordiques	NHL	60	4	12	16	100	16	0	3	3	18
1982–83	Quebec Nordiques	NHL	46	3	12	15	69	4	0	0	0	8
NHL totals			810	59	185	244	1986	140	14	18	32	352

Preceded by Bob Dickson	New York Rangers first-round draft pick 1969	Succeeded by Pierre Jarry
Preceded by Dan Johnson	CHL Most Valuable Player Award; 1970–71^{shared with Peter McDuffe; Gerry Ouellette; Joe Zanussi}	Succeeded by Gregg Sheppard
Preceded by Robbie Ftorek	Quebec Nordiques captain 1981–82	Succeeded by Mario Marois
