= List of people from Edmundston =

This is a list of notable people from Edmundston, New Brunswick. Although not everyone in this list was born in Edmundston, they all live or have lived in Edmundston and have had significant connections to the community.

Name	Famous for	Birth	Death	Other
Joseph Bérubé	government service (judge and ombudsman)			Longest-serving ombudsman of New Brunswick (1976–1993).
Maurice Bolyer	music	1920	1978	banjo player who appeared on The Tommy Hunter Show
Cédrick Desjardins	sports	1985		hockey goaltender, plays for the Tampa Bay Lightning affiliate in the AHL
Dave Hilton, Sr.	sports	1940	2023	professional boxer who won a Canadian championship in three different weight divisions
Ty LaForest	sports	1917	1947	Major League Baseball player who played with the Boston Red Sox
John Carl Murchie	military	1895	1966	Commander of the Canadian Army from 1943 to 1945
Maryse Ouellet	sports	1983		professional wrestler and former two-time WWE Divas Champion
Natasha St-Pier	music	1981		singer, better known in France
Shawn Sawyer	sports	1985		figure skater, finished 12th overall at the XXth Winter Olympics held in Turin, Italy
Bernard Valcourt	politics	1952		federal politician
Roch Voisine	music	1963		singer, actor (born and raised in St-Basile)

== See also ==
- List of people from New Brunswick
