= Jasper Wood =

Jasper Wood may refer to:

- Jasper Wood (photographer) (1921–2002)
- Jasper Wood (violinist) (born 1974)
