= List of people from Vaughan =

This is a list of notable people who are from Vaughan, Ontario, or who have spent a large or formative part of their career in that city.

== A ==
- Max Aitken — Canadian-British newspaper publisher
- Elizabeth Arden – founder of cosmetic company Elizabeth Arden, Inc.
- Andreas Athanasiou – NHL player

== B ==
- Robert Barbieri – professional rugby player for Benetton Treviso and the Italian national team
- Massimo Bertocchi – Olympic decathlete
- Mark Bocek – UFC fighter

== C ==
- Luca Caputi – ice hockey player
- Jesse Carere – actor
- Franklin Carmichael – Canadian artist and member of the Group of Seven
- Anthony Cirelli – hockey player
- Andrew Cogliano – NHL player
- Frank Corrado – National Hockey League player

== D ==
- Luca Del Bel Belluz – ice hockey player
- Phil Di Giuseppe – ice hockey player
- Natalie Di Luccio – international multilingual singer
- Sergio Di Zio – actor
- Justin DiBenedetto – ice hockey player
- Chris DiDomenico – ice hockey player

== E ==
- Steve Eminger – hockey player

== F ==
- Danny Fernandes – singer

== G ==
- Duff Gibson – skeleton racer and gold medalist at the 2006 Winter Olympics

== H ==
- Mike Harris – 22nd Premier of Ontario

== J ==
- Mendelson Joe – artist raised in Maple
- Franz Johnston – artist associated with the Group of Seven

== K ==
- Craig Kielburger – social entrepreneur, co-founder of WE Charity and Me to We
- Marc Kielburger – social entrepreneur, co-founder of WE Charity and Me to We

== L ==
- Michael Liambas – ice hockey player
- Arthur Lismer – English-Canadian painter, educator, and member of the Group of Seven

== M ==
- Adam Mascherin – hockey player
- Tyler Medeiros – teen singer
- Victor Mete – hockey player

== N ==
- Steve Nease – cartoonist

== P ==
- Al Palladini – politician
- Sarina Paris - dance/pop singer; grew up in Thornhill-Vaughan
- Russell Peters – international comedian; owns a house in Vaughan
- Michael Petrasso – soccer player
- Andi Petrillo – sports anchor
- Dina Pugliese – television personality

== R ==
- Marco Reda – professional soccer player
- David Rocco – actor and television cooking show host
- Vince Rocco – ice hockey player

== S ==
- Roman Sadovsky – Canadian figure skater and two-time Junior Grand Prix Finalist
- Denis Shapovalov – Israeli-Canadian tennis player
- Martina Sorbara – lead singer and songwriter of Juno-Award-winning band Dragonette

== T ==
- Marco Terminesi – soccer player

== V ==
- Fred Varley – member of the Group of Seven artists
- Phil Varone – hockey player

== W ==
- Andrew Wiggins – professional basketball player
