= List of people from Fredericton =

This is a list of notable people from Fredericton, New Brunswick, Canada. Although not everyone in this list was born in Fredericton, they all live or have lived there, and have had significant connections to the community.

Name	Famous for	Birth	Death	Other
Jake Allen	sports	1990		ice hockey goaltender, Stanley Cup winner
Lisa Alward	literature	1962		author
Rebecca Agatha Armour	literature	1845	1891	novelist and schoolteacher who lived almost her whole life in the town
John Babbitt	science	1845	1889	built the first working phonograph in New Brunswick
R. E. Balch	academics	1894	1994	entomologist
Gerard Beirne	literature	1962		author, fiction editor of The Fiddlehead
J. W. "Bud" Bird	politics	1932		provincial cabinet minister and member of the House of Commons of Canada
Bruno Bobak	art	1923	2012	painter, Canadian official war artist
Molly Lamb Bobak	art	1920	2014	painter,Canadian official war artist
Measha Brueggergosman	opera	1977		operatic soprano
Bliss Carman	literature	1861	1929	poet
Eilish Cleary	medicine	1963	2024	physician, epidemiologist, chief medical health officer of New Brunswick
David Coon	politics	1956		conservationist, politician, Leader of the Green Party of New Brunswick
Herb Curtis	literature	1949		author
Mike Eagles	sports	1963		former NHL player
Raymond Fraser	literature	1941	2018	author
Julia O. Henson	activism	1852	1922	co-founder of the NAACP and the Harriet Tubman house in Boston
Mark Anthony Jarman	literature	1955		author, fiction editor of The Fiddlehead
Gérard La Forest	law	1926	2025	puisne justice of the Supreme Court of Canada
Hugh Havelock McLean	politics	1854	1938	general, politician, lieutenant governor of New Brunswick
Hal Merrill	sports	1964		three-time bronze medalist at the Paralympic Games, two in the 1992 Summer Paralympics and one in the 1996 Summer Paralympics
David Myles	music	1981		musician
Alden Nowlan	literature	1933	1983	poet, playwright, journalist
Willie O'Ree	sports	1935		first Black NHL player
David Adams Richards	literature	1950		author, senator
Charles G. D. Roberts	literature	1860	1943	poet, the "father of Canadian poetry"
Goodridge Roberts	art	1904	1974	painter, Canadian official war artist
Theodore Goodridge Roberts	literature	1877	1953	author
Elizabeth Roberts MacDonald	literature	1864	1922	author, suffragette
John Saunders	politics	1754	1834	chief justice on N.B. Supreme Court
Andy Scott	politics	1955	2013	Minister of Indian Affairs and Northern Development
Anna Silk	television	1974		actor, starred as Bo Dennis on Lost Girl
Matt Stairs	sports	1968		Major League Baseball player

== See also ==
- List of people from New Brunswick
