= List of people from Moncton =

This is a list of notable people from Moncton, New Brunswick. People are included due to their connection to the town, even if not born in Moncton.

Name	Famous for	Birth	Death	Other
Michel Bastarache	government	1947		justice of the Supreme Court of Canada
Rick Bowness	athlete	1955		former NHL forward and established NHL head coach
Claudette Bradshaw	government	1949	2022	former federal Minister of Labour (1998–2004)
George Carroll	athlete	1897	1939	NHL defenceman
Herménégilde Chiasson	government	1946		artist, academic, lieutenant governor of New Brunswick 2003–2009
Reuben Cohen	business	1921	2014	lawyer and business magnate
Phil Comeau	film director	1956		directed first theatrical Acadian feature Le secret de Jérôme (Jerome's Secret)
Rhéal Cormier	athlete	1967	2021	baseball player
France Daigle	Acadian novelist	1953		winner of the Governor General's Literary Prize for French fiction in 2012
Michael de Adder	cartoonist	1967		political cartoonist
Holly Elissa Dignard	thespian	1979		film actor
Julie Doiron	musician	1972		indie rock musician with Eric's Trip
Gordie Drillon	athlete	1913	1986	hockey player
Allison Dysart	government	1880	1962	premier of New Brunswick (1935–1940)
Henry Emmerson	government	1853	1914	premier of New Brunswick (1897–1900), federal Minister of Railways and Canals (1904–1907)
Sandy Ferguson	athlete	1879	1919	heavyweight boxer; fought Jack Johnson five times
Sheree Fitch	writer	1956		children's author
René-Arthur Fréchet	architect	1879	1950	originally from Montreal
Ray Frenette	government	1935	2018	premier of New Brunswick (1997–1998)
Northrop Frye	writer	1912	1991	literary critic and academic; continues to be a prominent figure in Moncton culture, with The Frye Festival, an annual literary festival, bearing his name
Brian Gallant	government	1982		premier of New Brunswick (2014–2018)
Daniel Gaudet	athlete	1959		represented Canada in artistic gymnastics at the 1984 Summer Olympics in Los Angeles
Russ Howard	athlete	1956		two-time world champion and Olympic gold medalist men's curler
Don Jardine	professional wrestler	1940	2006	known as "The Spoiler" and "The Super Destroyer"; trainer of WWE wrestler The Undertaker
Travis Jayner	athlete	1982		Olympic bronze and World Championship silver medal-winning short track speed skater
Sami Landry	drag artist and social media personality	1998/1999		
Sonja Lang	linguist	c. 1978		linguist and translator, creator of the conlang Toki Pona
Gérald Leblanc	writer	1945	2005	author and poet
Roméo LeBlanc	government	1927	2009	former federal Minister of Fisheries, senator and speaker of the Canadian Senate; governor-general of Canada (1995–1999)
Bill "Spaceman" Lee	athlete	1946		American pro baseball pitcher; played four years with the Moncton Mets (1984–1987)
Viola Léger	thespian	1930	2023	stage actress and retired Canadian senator, known for her role as La Sagouine
James E. Lockyer	government	1949		law professor and former New Brunswick Minister of Justice
Bernard Lord	government	1965		premier of New Brunswick (1999–2006)
Roger Lord	musician			professional pianist, brother of former premier Bernard Lord
Antonine Maillet	writer	1929	2025	novelist, recipient of the Prix Goncourt, the highest honour in francophone literature
Robert Maillet	thespian	1969		film actor, played "Uber Immortal" in 300; played "Dredger" in 2009's Sherlock Holmes
Frank McKenna	government	1948		premier of New Brunswick (1987–1997), former Canadian ambassador to the United States
Matt Minglewood	musician	1947		rock musician
Terry Moore	athlete	1958		soccer player; NASL, Irish League, Olympics, played for Canada at the 1986 World Cup
Philippe Myers	athlete	1997		NHL defenceman
James Alexander Murray	government	1864	1960	premier of New Brunswick (1917)
Marg Osburne	musician	1927	1977	country and gospel singer, television and radio personality; featured on Don Messer's Jubilee and That Maritime Feeling
Rodney Ouellette	academic and government	1964		physician-scientist, founder of the Atlantic Cancer Research Institute and Canadian Senator
Calvin Pickard	athlete	1992		NHL goaltender
Mike Plume	musician	1968		country singer
Ivan Rand	government	1884	1969	justice of the Supreme Court of Canada; creator of the Rand formula, which allows union dues to be automatically subtracted from workers' salaries; member of the UNSCOP, which oversaw the partition of Palestine in 1947
Brenda Robertson	government	1929	2020	first female member of the New Brunswick legislature, first female cabinet minister in New Brunswick, Canadian senator (1984–2004)
Clifford William Robinson	government	1866	1944	premier of New Brunswick (1907–1908), Canadian senator
George Steeves	writer	c. 1945		contemporary photographer
Frederick W. Sumner	merchant and political figure	1855	1919	merchant and political figure in New Brunswick
Robb Wells	thespian	1971		comic actor, played "Ricky" on TV's Trailer Park Boys
Rick White	musician	1970		indie rock musician (Eric's Trip, Elevator)
Jasper Wood	musician	1974		concert violinist

== See also ==
- List of people from New Brunswick
