= Frances Elizabeth Murray =

Canadian author (c. 1831 – 1901)

- Born: c. 1831; New Brunswick, Canada
- Died: c. 13 February 1901; Saint John, New Brunswick, Canada
- Occupations: Charitable worker; author
- Known for: Leadership in women's organizations; charitable work; literary contributions
- Notable work: Memoir of LeBaron Botsford, M.D. (1892); In memoriam: Frederick Hervey John Brigstocke (1899); “The story of Laura Secord” (1898); “The church work of Protestant women in Canada” (1900)
- Parent(s): John Thomas Murray and Harriet Letitia Despard

Frances Elizabeth Murray (c. 1831 – February 13, 1901) was a Canadian writer and charitable worker.

== Biography ==
The daughter of John Thomas Murray, a lawyer, and Harriet Letitia Despard, she spent much of her life in the home of her uncle Doctor LeBaron Botsford in Saint John, New Brunswick. She was vice-president and Botsford was president of the Eclectic Reading Club from 1880 to 1888; she became president in 1888 following the death of her uncle and held that post until October 1892. She was also a member of the Natural History Society of New Brunswick. She taught Sunday school for St. Paul's parish of the Church of England. She was a member of the ladies' committee for the Saint John Protestant Orphan Asylum and first president of the ladies' auxiliary for the St. John Society for the Prevention of Cruelty to Animals. She also served as vice-president and corresponding secretary of the Local Council of Women of Saint John.

She published Memoir of LeBaron Botsford, M.D. in 1892. In 1899, she published In memoriam: Frederick Hervey John Brigstocke, archdeacon of St. John. She wrote an article "The story of Laura Secord" which appeared in Canadian History in December 1898. Her essay "The church work of Protestant women in Canada" appeared in the anthology Women of Canada, published in 1900.

She died suddenly in Saint John in 1901.

== Legacy ==
A gynaecological ward was established in her name at the Saint John General Hospital.
