= List of people from Brantford =

Notable people from Brantford, Canada

This is a list of notable people from Brantford, Ontario, Canada.

== Military ==
- William Landymore, Commander Maritime Command (1964–1966)
- Percy W. Nelles, Chief of the Naval Staff (RCN) (1934–1944)
- Gordon Raphael, flying ace with the Royal Air Force during the Second World War
- Geoffrey Walsh, Commander of the Canadian Army (1961–1965)

== Film and television ==
- Andrea Brooks, actress
- Phil Hartman, Canadian-American actor
- Shelley Niro, producer and director
- Michelle Nolden
- Jay Silverheels, actor; known for the role of Tonto on The Lone Ranger

== Literature and journalism ==
- Peter Calamai, science journalist
- June Callwood, author and journalist
- Thomas B. Costain, author and journalist
- Sara Jeannette Duncan, author and journalist
- Pauline Johnson (also known in Mohawk as Tekahionwake), aboriginal poet
- John B. Lee, poet
- Marsha Skrypuch, author

== Science ==
- Alexander Graham Bell, inventor of the telephone
- James Hillier, inventor of electron microscope

== The arts ==
- Blanche Crozier, stage actress
- Lawren Harris, founder of the Group of Seven
- Wade Hemsworth, songwriter
- Paul Kneale, artist
- Casey Mecija and Jennifer Mecija, musicians (Ohbijou)
- Shelley Niro, photographer and installation artist
- Garnet Rogers, musician, singer, songwriter, and composer
- Lonnie Szoke, musician and songwriter

== Politics ==
- Alfred Apps, President, Liberal Party of Canada
- Henry Cockshutt, Lieutenant Governor of Ontario of Ontario
- Phil Gillies, Member of the Legislative Assembly and Cabinet Minister
- Arthur Sturgis Hardy, Premier of Ontario (1896–1899)
- Dave Levac, Speaker of the Legislative Assembly of Ontario and MPP for the electoral riding of Brant
- William Ross Macdonald, PC, OC, CD, QC (1891–1976), served as the 21st Lieutenant Governor of Ontario (1968–1974); Speaker of the House of Commons of Canada (1949–1953)
- Lawrence Pennell, Solicitor General of Canada (1965–1968); Ontario Supreme Court Judge (1968–1985)
- David Reville, Member of the Legislative Assembly for Riverdale, 1985–90
- Jane Stewart PC, served as MP and federal cabinet minister (Minister of Human Resources)

== Sportspeople ==
=== Ice hockey players ===
- Bill Cook, right winger and coach
- Bryan Fogarty, defenceman
- Dave Gans, centre
- Gerry Gray, goaltender
- Chris Gratton, centre
- Dan Gratton, centre
- Josh Gratton, left winger
- Brent Gretzky, centre
- Keith Gretzky, centre and former interim general manager of the Edmonton Oilers
- Wayne Gretzky, centre; considered the best NHL player of all time
- Len Hachborn, centre; childhood friend of Wayne Gretzky
- Adam Henrique, centre
- Pat Hickey, left winger
- Doug Jarvis, forward, coach, and senior advisor to the Vancouver Canucks
- Keith Jones, forward, President of Hockey Operations for the Philadelphia Flyers
- Brandon Montour, defenceman
- Chris Pusey, goaltender and defenceman
- Jeff Reese, now goalie coach with the Dallas Stars
- Greg Stefan, goaltender and goaltending coach for the Flint Firebirds
- Paul Szczechura, forward

=== Other sports ===
- Mike Beres, Olympic badminton player
- Aaron Carpenter, rugby union player
- J. Howard Crocker, educator and sports executive with the YMCA and Amateur Athletic Union of Canada
- John Gallant, professional lacrosse player, NCAA Coach
- David Hearn, golfer
- Julie Howard, Olympic swimmer
- Tanya Hunks, Olympic swimmer
- Nick Kaczur, American football player
- Jacqueline Legere, Ice Cross Downhill
- Tom Longboat, distance runner
- Rob Pikula, Canadian football player
- Kevin Sullivan, Olympic runner
- Jordan Szoke, professional superbike racer
- Bill Watkins, manager in Major League Baseball

== Other ==
- Mahmoud Mohammad Issa Mohammad, Palestinian former member of the Popular Front for the Liberation of Palestine; deported
