= Charles Simonds =

Charles Simonds may refer to:

- Charles Simonds (politician) (1783–1859), Canadian merchant and political figure
- Charles Simonds (artist) (born 1945), American contemporary artist and sculptor
