= Robert J. Patterson (restaurateur) =

- Born: November 1809; Richmond, Virginia
- Died: October 2, 1884 (aged 74); Saint John, New Brunswick
- Occupation: Restaurateur
- Years active: 1859–1884
- Spouses: Edith Bridges (married until 1881); Georgiana Sparrow (married 1882–1884)

Robert J. Patterson (1809–1884) was a former slave and a restaurateur in Saint John, New Brunswick.

Patterson was born enslaved in Richmond, Virginia, in November 1809. He escaped slavery in 1842 and made his way north first to New York and then to Boston, where he lived for ten years. As the Fugitive Slave Act of 1850 made life increasingly dangerous for African Americans living in northern states, in 1852 Patterson decided to leave the country, relocating to the British colony of New Brunswick.

Patterson was a member of the group that in 1856 organized the first "Emancipation Ceremonies", an annual commemoration of 1833's Slavery Abolition Act. He and other former slaves spoke and sang, and advocated for abolition in the United States.

Around 1859 he opened an oyster bar which would become the Empire Dining Saloon, one of the most popular restaurants in Saint John. In 1860 he was granted the Freedom of the City, an honour which recognized his prominence in the community and, probably more importantly, granted him the right to operate a business. Upon his death in 1884, he was described as "one of the most popular caterers in the Dominion of Canada."
