= Edith Butler =

Edith Butler may refer to:

- Édith Butler (born 1942), Acadian-Canadian singer-songwriter and folklorist
- Edith F. Butler (1888–1975), American artist and illustrator
