= Jasper Wood (photographer) =

American photographer, writer, and free-speech activist

Jasper Wood (January 2, 1921 – June 7, 2002) was an American self-taught writer, photographer active 1945–1960, and free-speech activist.

== Biography ==
Jasper Wood was born in Wilmington, North Carolina, son of Attorney Lehman Wood. In 1936 his family moved to Cleveland. He attended Cleveland Heights High School and in 1938, as a 17-year-old senior he acquired rights to publish Ernest Hemingway’s film script for his narration of The Spanish Earth on the Spanish Civil War, which Wood promoted in his introduction as Hemingway's greatest contribution, though they had a disagreement when the author insisted on a disclaimer on the title page of the book. Film critic W. Ward Marsh wrote a vehement defence of Wood in Cleveland's The Plain Dealer.

Wood enrolled at Cleveland College in 1939, where he continued his interest in writing as assistant editor of Sky Line, the school's literary magazine. He wrote poetry and a play, and was the local jazz critic for DownBeat magazine in the 1940s. He survived by taking short-term jobs and in 1943 was employed in the advertising department of The Plain Dealer.

== Photographer ==
Through a colleague, in 1944 Jasper met Nancy Manning, daughter of artist Wray Manning and co-director of the 1030 Gallery. They had their first child, Denis, in 1945 and the family traveled to Mexico while Wood worked on his first novel, and entranced by the indigenous tribes in the small villages surrounding Acapulco, Cuernavaca and San Cristóbal de las Casas, he took his first photos. The next year Wood purchased a 35 mm Contax II rangefinder camera and started taking pictures in Cleveland and in Ohio's Amish country.

“It is only of the poor of the slums or of the far away primitive that I can get the photographs I want. These people have a rhythmic quality which the rest of us have lost.”

== Recognition ==
He first exhibited his work in 1947 at the Cleveland Museum of Art's annual May Show, the first of subsequent May show awards; in 1949, 1951, 1953 and two honourable mentions in 1947, 1952. In the meantime Wood began writing reviews of local jazz musicians for the Cleveland Press and Downbeat Magazine, and made a regular income as an advertising agent.

Curator Edward Steichen chose Wood's photograph of a pensive barefoot Mexican girl hurrying with her empty basket past a wooden door for the 1955 world-touring the Museum of Modern Art exhibit The Family of Man, seen by 9 million visitors. Woods had been included in a previous MoMA show Photographs by 51 Photographers August 1 to September 17, 1950.

== The Scovill photographs ==
Around 1949 Wood and his young family moved to 1294 Spruce Court in the Lakeview Terrace, one of the nation's first federally funded housing projects, and in the 1950s Wood had several one-man and two-man shows of imagery made in the neighbourhood. His principal subjects were inhabitants of the Scovill Avenue area of Cleveland, familiar to him from his visits to jazz clubs in the neighbourhood in the late 1930s and early 1940s. Exhibition venues included Image Gallery (New York City), the San Francisco Museum, the Los Angeles County Museum and an exhibition of Scovill photographs at the 1030 Gallery in Cleveland from February 19-March 11, 1950. His Girl with Doll, part of the Scovill series, won first place in the 1951 American Photography magazine annual contest. Also that year, the Akron Art Museum held a joint show by Jasper Wood and friend Harry Schulke who were each asked to invite 13 photographers to exhibit work alongside theirs. Wood invited Ben Shahn, Walker Evans, Ansel Adams, Edward Steichen, and Bernice Abbott.

In 1953, Wood also ventured into film with a 15-minute short Streetcar, which provides a cross-section of life in Cleveland by depicting passengers traveling the tramway in the early 1950s, just before it stopped running in Cleveland in 1954.

Wood's motivation in making photographs and film was existential and humanist, and he was not interested in deriving profit from or making a career of a creative medium which he regarded as a means to connect with his subject and to capture what he called the ‘felt moment seen’, in his paraphrase of Henri Cartier-Bresson’s ‘decisive moment’. For a living, he and partner Carl Malmquist established Malmquist and Wood advertising art studio in 1955, a concern profitable enough that the family no longer qualified to live in the housing project where they had built a modest life and they relocated to a three-bedroom apartment in Cleveland Heights where they lived a more privileged existence.

== Later career ==
Wood's interest in photography wavered but his love of art continued, bringing him success as an art dealer. A film society he'd founded screened others' works at the Cleveland Museum of Art and the Masonic Temple.

When his friend Nico Jacobellis was arrested on obscenity charges in 1959 for showing Louis Malle’s The Lovers at the Heights Art Theater, Wood founded 'Citizens for Freedom of the Mind'. Through it he raised funds for the defence of bookseller James Lowell and counterculture poet D. A. Levy against charges of obscenity corrupting a minor during their poetry reading on November 15, 1966.

Wood had stopped taking photographs altogether by 1960 and his last show was in Image Gallery (New York City) that year. By 1970 he had closed Malmquist and Wood for an early retirement and he and Manning married and purchased a house in San Cristobal, living in Mexico until 1973 when Wood returned to work as an advertising agent, relocating to Raleigh, North Carolina, to be near his eldest son.

Wood died in 2002, survived by his sons Denis, Chris, and Peter and his wife, who died in 2008.

The Jasper Wood Collection, consisting of all extant photographic negatives by Jasper Wood, a collection of photographic prints by Wood, an original 16mm copy of Wood's short film Streetcar, and biographical information is held in the Cleveland Public Library. The collection is available online on the library's Digital Gallery.

== Exhibitions ==
- Annual May Show, Cleveland Museum of Art, 1947, 1949, 1951, 1952, 1953.
- 1030 Gallery, Cleveland, February 19–March 11, 1950
- Photographs by 51 Photographers, Museum of Modern Art, 1 August–17 September 1950
- Photographs by Jasper Wood, San Francisco Museum April 2, 1952 – May 11, 1952
- Los Angeles County Museum
- The Family of Man, Museum of Modern Art, 24 January–8 May 1955 with world tour until 1960.
- Image Gallery (New York City) 1960

=== Posthumous exhibitions ===
- The Image Gallery: Redux 1959-1962, Howard Greenberg Gallery, February 15–22, 2014
- Jasper Wood’s Cleveland, Cleveland Public Library, October 28–November 14, 2016

== Bibliography ==
- Gray, Arthur, 1884-1976; Barnhill, Wm. A; Wood, Jasper; Borowiec, Andrew, 1956-; Dean, Sharon E., 1959-; Busta, William; Cleveland Artists Foundation; Cleveland Public Library (2007), Visions of a city with a soul : four photographers in Cleveland, 1925-2005, [Cleveland, OH] Cleveland Artsist Foundation and Cleveland Public Library, ISBN 978-0-9716009-9-7
