= List of people from Kingston, Ontario =

This is a list of notable people who are from Kingston, Ontario, lived, or have spent a large part or formative part of their career in that city.

== A ==
- The Abrams - John and James
- Bryan Adams
- Bryan Allen
- Grant Allen
- Syl Apps
- Scott Arniel
- Ian Arthur
- Sean Avery

== B ==
- Rob Bagg
- Rob Baker
- Edgar Benson
- Leonard Birchall
- Norman L. Bowen
- Molly Brant
- Matt Brash (baseball)
- Kip Brennan

== C ==
- Wallace Bruce Matthews Carruthers
- John Solomon Cartwright
- Wayne Cashman
- Don Cherry
- Joe Chithalen
- Alice Chown
- Chris Clifford
- Paul Coffey
- Bill Cook
- Bun Cook
- Matt Cooke
- Helen Cooper
- John Counter
- William Coverdale
- Thomas Cromwell
- Tim Cronk
- Michael Crummey
- Oamo Culbreath
- Peter Cullen

== D ==
- Bob Dailey
- Ted Darling
- William Rupert Davies
- Rob Davison
- Hugh Dillon
- Jim Dorey
- Gord Downie
- Ned Dickens

== E ==
- Aaliyah Edwards
- Chaucer Elliott
- Wally Elmer
- John Erskine

== F ==
- Lorne Ferguson
- Bill Fitsell
- John Frizzell

== G ==
- John Gerretsen
- Mark Gerretsen
- Michael Giffin
- Doug Gilmour
- Mike Gillis
- Robert Hampton Gray
- Cory Greenwood

== H ==
- Taylor Hall
- Sarah Harmer
- Scott Harrington
- James Edwin Hawley
- Jayna Hefford
- Steven Heighton
- Jason Heinrichs, also known as Anomaly
- Karin Helmstaedt
- David Helwig
- Maggie Helwig
- Jack Hendrickson
- Ted Hsu
- Helen Humphreys
- Sasha "Scarlett" Hostyn

== J ==
- James Jerome
- Brent Johnson

== K ==
- John Keats
- Matt Kirk
- George Macaulay Kirkpatrick

== L ==
- Hugh Le Caine
- Amanda Leveille
- Ryan Letourneau
- David Ling
- Ken Linseman

== M ==
- Evan MacColl
- Flora MacDonald
- John A. Macdonald
- James Macdonnell
- Gary MacGregor
- Ryan Malcolm
- Gus Marker
- Tom Marshall
- John Matheson
- Jay McClement
- Mike McCullough
- Bruce McDonald
- Piers McDonald
- George McDougall
- Jay McKee
- Matt McQuillan
- Tony McKegney
- Ari Millen
- Peter Milliken
- Mike Moffatt
- Gordon Monahan
- Oliver Mowat
- Marjan Mozetich
- Kirk Muller
- Robert Mundell
- Hannah Murphy
- Bob Murray

== N ==
- Bernie Nicholls
- Keith Norton

== O ==
- Fred O'Donnell
- Matt O'Donnell
- Michael Ondaatje

== P ==
- Rick Paterson
- Ron Plumb
- Arthur Edward Potts

== R ==
- Andrew Raycroft
- Craig Rivet
- John Robertson
- Taylor Robertson
- Jessamyn Rodriguez
- Norman McLeod Rogers
- George John Romanes (1848–1894), evolutionary biologist
- Dwight Ross
- Annie Rothwell
- Nicky Romero
- Patricia Rozema
- Rusty Ryan (actor)
- Iain Reid

== S ==
- Hugh Segal
- Polly Shannon
- Peter Short
- Duncan G. Sinclair
- Gord Sinclair
- David Sweet
- Harry Sinden
- Carolyn Smart
- Arthur Britton Smith
- Mike Smith
- Rick Smith
- Chris St. Clair
- George F.G. Stanley
- Henry Starnes
- Dee Sterling
- George Okill Stuart
- John Stuart
- James T. Sutherland
- Andy Sutton

== T ==
- Judith Thompson
- Pat Thornton
- John Tripp

== U ==
- David Usher

== V ==
- Gabriel Vilardi
- Matt Villalta

== W ==
- Bronwen Wallace
- Flat Walsh
- Ken Watkin
- Bill Welychka
- Simon Whitfield
- Gary Wilson
- Jeremy Wang
- Daniel Woolf

== Y ==
- Zal Yanovsky
