= List of people from Scarborough, Ontario =

The following is a list of people from the Toronto suburb of Scarborough, Ontario.

== Athletes ==
- Kyle Alexander (born 1996), basketball player for Hapoel Tel Aviv of the Israeli Basketball Premier League
- Michael Bunting, NHL player
- Brad Aitken NHL hockey player
- Denham Brown, professional basketball player
- Jeff Cowan, NHL player
- Clifton Dawson, NFL football player
- Kris Draper, NHL player, Detroit redwings manager
- Andre De Grasse, Olympic track and field athlete
- Jonathan de Guzman, Eredivisie professional soccer player
- Dwayne De Rosario, MLS soccer player
- Ben Johnson (born 1961), sprinter
- George Kottaras, MLB baseball player
- Larissa Lowing (born 1973), artistic gymnast
- Jamaal Magloire, NBA basketball player
- Kamal Miller, professional soccer player
- Cindy Nicholas, swimmer
- Paul Peschisolido, retired soccer player, current manager of Burton Albion F.C.
- Cherie Piper, member of the Canadian national women's ice hockey team
- Greg Ranjitsingh, soccer player
- Mike Ricci, NHL player
- Bobby Roode, wrestler
- Sam Schachter (born 1990), Olympic beach volleyball player
- Wayne Simmonds, NHL player
- Devante Smith-Pelly, NHL player
- Natalie Spooner, member of the Canadian national women's ice hockey team
- Anthony Stewart, NHL player
- Tom Thomson, CFL player, born and raised in Scarborough
- Rick Tocchet, NHL player
- Tyler Toffoli, NHL player
- Paul Tracy, race car driver
- Ron Tugnutt, NHL player
- Joseph Valtellini, kickboxer
- Laura Walker, curler
- Kevin Weekes, NHL player
- Peter Zezel, NHL player

== Media ==
- Eric Bauza, voice actor and comedian
- Sugar Lyn Beard, television/voice actress, host, and TV/radio personality
- Gerry Dee, actor, comedian
- Andy Donato, editorial cartoonist for the Toronto Sun newspaper
- Merella Fernandez, television anchor and reporter
- Melyssa Ford, model and actress
- David Furnish, filmmaker and husband of Elton John
- Rishi James Ganjoo, singer in Danko Jones
- Nicole Holness, TV host, R&B singer
- Henry Lau, singer in Super Junior-M
- Doris McCarthy, artist
- Eric McCormack, actor
- Mike Myers, comedian known for his portrayal of Austin Powers
- Alan Park, comedian who starred in Royal Canadian Air Farce
- Jasmine Richards, actress
- Craig Russell, actor and female impersonator
- Domee Shi - animator, director of Turning Red
- Cassie Steele, actor
- Mark Taylor, actor
- Michael Wincott, actor
- Lilly Singh, YouTube personality
- Steve Dangle, Canadian sports analyst, comedian, author, and internet personality
- Stephan James, actor
- Shamier Anderson, actor
- Ellen Wong, actress

== Musicians ==
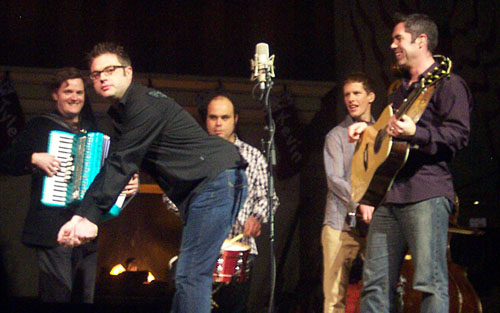
Barenaked Ladies, a popular band from Scarborough

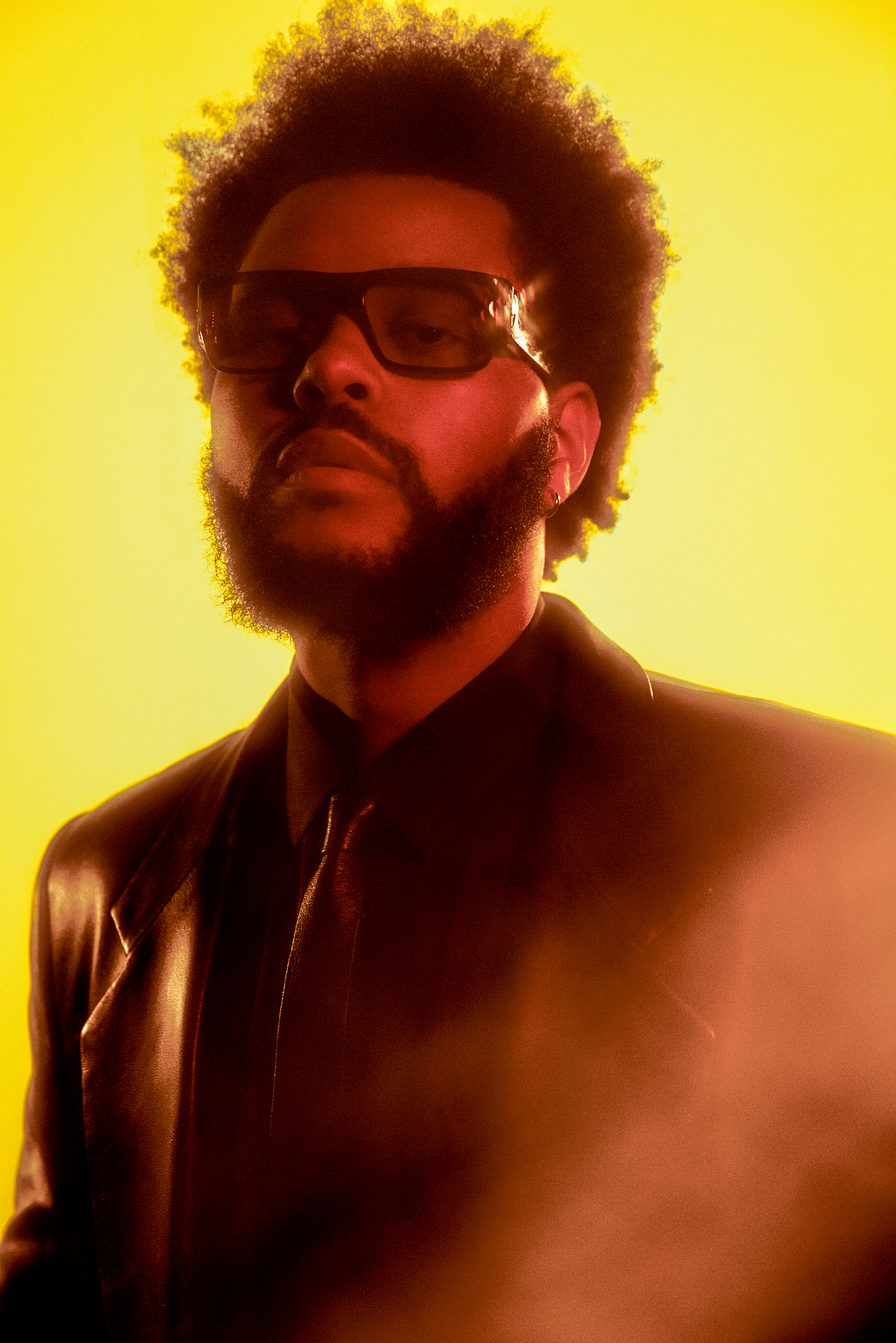
The Weeknd, a popular artist from Scarborough

- Tony Ann, Canadian pianist and composer
- Barenaked Ladies, popular alternative rock band
- The Beaches, indie rock band
- Bedouin Soundclash, alternative rock band
- Boi-1da, hip hop producer
- BrassMunk, hip hop group
- Carole Pope, singer/songwriter
- Choclair, rapper
- Deborah Cox, R&B singer-songwriter, actress
- Deryck Whibley, singer/songwriter and guitarist of Sum 41
- Fefe Dobson, rock singer and songwriter
- Francesco Yates, singer/songwriter
- Glenn Lewis, R&B singer and songwriter
- Goddo, rock band
- IRS, Hip Hop group
- Joe Cash, singer/songwriter
- Kardinal Offishall, rapper
- k-os, rapper
- Lawrence Gowan, solo artist and keyboard player/singer of Styx
- Lisa Shaw, house and soul singer-songwriter
- Maestro, rapper and actor
- Monolith, Hip Hop group
- More or Les, rapper, DJ and producer
- Nineteen85, hip hop producer and songwriter
- Saukrates, rapper
- Slaughter, thrash metal band
- The Ugly Ducklings, 1960s rock band
- The Weeknd, singer/songwriter

== Others ==
- Paul Bernardo, serial rapist and murderer
- Shary Boyle, artist
- Lenna Bradburn, public sector executive, first female Canadian police chief
- David Chariandy, novelist
- Bill Hastings, former Chief Censor of New Zealand now Chief Justice of Kiribati
- Luka Magnotta, Canadian porn actor and murderer
- Jay Manuel, creative director for America's Next Top Model and host of its Canadian counterpart
- Lilly Singh, YouTuber, actress
- Jayde Nicole, Playboy playmate
- David Onley, Lieutenant Governor of Ontario
- Beryl Potter, disability rights activist
- Monika Schnarre, supermodel
- Fred and Norah Urquhart, entomologists who discovered the migration route of monarch butterflies
