= List of people from Etobicoke =

The following is a list of people from Etobicoke, Ontario.

== Sportspeople ==
- Jim Aldred, ice hockey player and coach of the Portugal men's national ice hockey team
- David Bolland, ice hockey player (London Knights, member of the National Canadian Junior Hockey Team)
- Connor Brown, ice hockey player
- David Clarkson, ice hockey player
- Paul Clatney, former Canadian football linebacker/defensive back
- Carlo Colaiacovo, professional hockey player
- Ken Dryden, politician and former NHL goaltender; attended Etobicoke Collegiate Institute
- Manny Fernandez, former ice hockey player
- Dave Huntley, former professional lacrosse player
- Emilie Livingston, rhythmic gymnast
- Steve Ludzik, ice hockey player, coach, analyst
- Mark Napier, ice hockey player
- Colin Patterson, professional hockey player
- Dave Reid (ice hockey, born 1964), retired Canadian ice hockey left winger
- Brendan Shanahan, former ice hockey player and former President and Alternate Governor for the Toronto Maple Leafs
- Brendan Smith, professional hockey player
- Jordan Subban, professional hockey player
- Malcolm Subban, professional hockey player
- P. K. Subban, professional hockey player
- Paul Stalteri, soccer player
- Stephen Valiquette, former ice hockey player (New York Rangers goalie)
- Joey Votto, baseball player (Cincinnati Reds first baseman)
- Peter Zezel, former ice hockey and soccer player
- Summer McIntosh, a Canadian competitive swimmer.

== Media ==
- Jerry Agar, host of Jerry Agar Show NEWSTALK1010; resident
- Jason Agnew, television producer, host, radio personality and writer
- King Bach, Actor, Comedian, and Director
- Bruce McDonald, film and television director
- Nicole Stamp, host of Reach For The Top; attended Richview Collegiate Institute

== Musicians ==
- Dave Bidini, musician, the Rheostatics, author On a Cold Road, Tropic of Hockey
- Basia Bulat, musician
- Dave Clark, musician, the Rheostatics and The Dinner Is Ruined
- Tom Cochrane, musician
- Cold Specks, musician, now based in London
- Ghetto Concept, hip-hop artists, pioneers in Toronto's hip-hop scene (Rexdale)
- Jelleestone, hip hop musician
- Jeff Healey, rock musician
- K'naan, hip hop musician
- NAV, hip hop recording artist and record producer
- Rheostatics, rock band
- Steve Shelski, musician, composer
- Jane Siberry, singer, songwriter, poet
- Snow, hip-hop artist, "Informer"
- Martin Tielli, musician, the Rheostatics
- Tim Vesely, musician, the Rheostatics
- Spek Won, hip hop musician

== Actors ==
- King Bach, Actor, Comedian, and Director
- Daniel DeSanto, actor and voice actor
- Robin Duke, actress; attended Burnhamthorpe Collegiate Institute
- Dave Foley, actor
- Mike Lobel, actor; attended Etobicoke School of the Arts
- Catherine O'Hara, actress; attended Burnhamthorpe Collegiate Institute
- Anastasia Phillips, actress
- Dan Redican, actor/writer
- Michael Seater, actor
- Kiefer Sutherland, actor; attended several local schools including John G. Althouse Middle School, Martingrove Collegiate Institute and Silverthorn Collegiate Institute
- Katheryn Winnick, actress

== Politicians ==
- Tim Bardsley, ex-politician, now lawyer
- Nathan Cullen, NDP Member of Parliament
- Doug Ford Sr., was a Canadian businessman and politician
- Doug Ford, Jr., premier of Ontario
- Rob Ford, late and former Mayor of Toronto
- John Hallett, politician
- Stephen Harper, former Prime Minister of Canada; attended Richview Collegiate Institute
- Allan Rock, former Minister of Health & Canadian Ambassador to the United Nations
- J.S. Woodsworth, social activist and founding leader of the Co-operative Commonwealth Federation, the precursor to the New Democratic Party
