= List of people from Dieppe, New Brunswick =

This is a list of notable people from Dieppe, New Brunswick. Although not everyone in this list was born in Dieppe, they all live or have lived in Dieppe and have had significant connections to the community.

Name	Famous for	Birth	Death	Description	Ref(s).
Fayo	music	1977	2024	songwriter, born in Dieppe	
Kamylle Frenette	sports	1996		paratriathlete, born and grew up in Dieppe	
Corinne Gallant	activism	1922	2018	professor, feminist activist, member of the Order of Canada	
Charlie Gillespie	acting	1998		actor, born in Dieppe	
Cy LeBlanc	politics	1955		businessman and politician, former MP for Dieppe Centre-Lewisville to the Legislative Assembly of New Brunswick, born in Dieppe	
Paul LeBlanc	makeup and hairstyling	1946	2019	Academy Award-winning hairstylist (Amadeus, Return of the Jedi, Black Swan)	
Rodney Ouellette	medicine and politics	1964		Physician-Scientist, Founder of Atlantic Cancer Research Institute and Senator of Canada (2026-)	
Raymond Guy LeBlanc	music	1945	2021	musician and poet, born in the Saint-Anselme area	
Bill Malenfant	politics	1929	2016	former mayor of Dieppe (1971–1977, 1983–1998)	

== See also ==
- List of people from New Brunswick
