= Arnott Whitney =

Canadian ice hockey player

- Born: November 16, 1931; Newcastle, New Brunswick, Canada
- Died: February 23, 2024 (aged 92); Thunder Bay, Ontario, Canada
- Height: 6 ft 0 in (183 cm)
- Weight: 180 lb (82 kg; 12 st 12 lb)
- Position: Defense
- Shot: Right
- Played for: Hershey Bears; Victoria Cougars; Winnipeg Warriors; Quebec Aces
- Playing career: 1949–1958

Arnott Whitney (November 16, 1931-February 23, 2024) was a Canadian professional hockey player who played for the Hershey Bears in the American Hockey League. He also played for the Victoria Cougars and Winnipeg Warriors in the Western Hockey League, and the Quebec Aces in the Quebec Hockey League. He later worked as an inspector for the Government of Ontario.
