= Shogomoc, New Brunswick =

Coordinates: 45.956252°N 67.329412°W

Shogomoc is a Canadian rural community in York County, New Brunswick.

The community is located on the east side of the Saint John River of Route 2.

== Notable people ==
- Roland H. Hartley (1864–1952), governor of Washington

== See also ==
- List of communities in New Brunswick
