= Brenda Best =

North American singer-songwriter

Brenda Best is a North American singer-songwriter.

== Biography ==
Born and raised in Campbellton, New Brunswick, Canada. Since 1999, she has been living in Nashville, Tennessee. She is a singer/songwriter and entertainer with a residency show at The Nashville Nightlife Theatre since 2001 The Best of Country. In 2011, American Society of Composers Authors and Publishers (ASCAP) awarded her with an ASCAP Award for songwriting. She is a four-time NIMA Awards recipient (Nashville Independent Music Awards). In 2015, she was Inducted into the New Brunswick Country Music Hall of Fame (NBCMHOF). In 2018 she was a guest speaker at The Summer NAMM show held in Nashville, TN (Success Secrets For Independent Songwriters And Artists), She is a member of the Country Music Association (CMA), the Gospel Music Association (GMA), Nashville Songwriters Association International (NSAI), and she is a Grammy Awards voting member with The Recording Academy since 2013.

In 2025, Best received a Josie Music Award nomination for Best Music Video (Performance Focused-Female).
