= George Steeves =

Canadian art photographer

- Born: 1945 (age 80–81); Moncton, New Brunswick, Canada
- Education: Carleton University; Cornell University
- Occupation: art photographer
- Years active: 1970s–present

George Steeves (b. ca. 1945) is a Canadian art photographer noted for his highly personal work. He has been called by art historian and curator Martha Langford, "among the foremost figures of contemporary Canadian photography."

== Life ==
Born in Moncton, New Brunswick, Steeves attended school in Ottawa and studied engineering at Carleton University and Cornell University, Ithaca, New York. He has lived in Halifax, Nova Scotia since 1973 and worked as an engineer with the Bedford Institute of Oceanography, where he was supervisor of mechanical and oceanographic systems development before retiring in 2006. In the 1970s, he began making urban landscape photographs using an 8x10 negative camera and developing and printing his own work. In 1981, inspired by local performance artist Ellen Pierce, he decided to focus on figurative work. Apparently needing to know his subjects very well before photographing them, he often spends more time talking than actually taking pictures. He has forged deep friendships with some of his subjects, whom he has continued to photograph on numerous occasions. With this approach, and the trust he engenders in his subjects, he has achieved a deeply personal, intimate body of work.

Probably because of the often erotic nature of his pictures, he has worked largely in obscurity within his own community. A 1989 exhibit at the Nova Scotia College of Art and Design was publicly opposed and posters were removed. After the show ended, his works were damaged when they were removed from the walls. A 1993 exhibition at the Canadian Museum of Contemporary Photography in Ottawa was more successful. His work has also been shown at the Louisiana Museum of Modern Art in Denmark and the Saidye Bronfman Centre for the Arts in Montreal. A thirty-year retrospective exhibition was mounted at Mount Saint Vincent University Art Gallery in 2007 and in 2011 he curated and wrote the catalogue essay for the exhibition, Lisette Model: A Performance in Photography which ran from October 8 through November 20, 2011 at MSVU Art Gallery. His works are included in the collections of the National Gallery of Canada and Mount Saint Vincent University. He currently lives and works in Halifax with his wife, Ingrid Jenkner.

== Films ==
- Portrait of the Artist as His Muse (2003 film)
- Race is a Four Letter Word (stills credit)
