= Julia O. Henson =

Canadian-born African-American activist and leader (1852-after 1922)

- Born: Julia W. O'Ree; October 1852; Fredericton, New Brunswick, British North America
- Died: After 1922
- Occupations: Dressmaker, boarding room operator
- Known for: Social justice activist

Julia O. Henson (October 1852 – after 1922) was an American social justice activist and leader. Born in what was then British North America, she became an American citizen. She founded organizations to support African-American troops during World War I (1914–1918) and to provide opportunities for African Americans to thrive through the founding of the National Association for the Advancement of Colored People (NAACP). She donated the building for the Harriet Tubman House in Boston in 1904.

== Early life and marriage ==
Julia W. O'Ree, the daughter of Ann and Henry O'Ree, was born in Fredericton, New Brunswick, British North America in October 1852. She immigrated to the United States in 1883 and seven years later she worked as a dressmaker and lived in a boarding house in Boston.

O'Ree married George D. Henson on September 12, 1894, becoming Julia O. Henson. By 1900, they operated a rooming house with 19 other residents on Holyoke Street in Boston. Her husband died on October 23, 1909, in Boston. He was buried at Mt. Hope Cemetery in Boston.

By 1910, her husband had died and she was living alone in her mortgaged house on Arie Street. She supported herself by working as a dressmaker.

== Activism ==
Henson lived in a neighborhood near African American women leaders in social action and the arts. She lived at 25 Holyoke Street next to Susie King Taylor, an American Civil War nurse. In 1904, Henson donated her home to be used as a residence for unmarried African American women—who did not have access to college dormitories or quality roominghouses—at the request of her friend Harriet Tubman. She was president of the Harriet Tubman House (located on the Boston Women's Heritage Trail). Harriet Tubman stayed with Henson at the house when she visited Boston.

She addressed groups, such as the topic What a Young Woman can do to make a happy home in 1908 in New York City. Henson founded the African American Northeastern Federation of Women's Clubs with Josephine St. Pierre Ruffin, a friend. She was co-founder of the National Association for the Advancement of Colored People (NAACP). At the outbreak of World War I, Maria L. Baldwin planned to establish the Soldier's Comfort Unit to help African American troops. Ruffin, Henson, and Baldwin founded the organization.
