= Gerry Ouellette =

Canadian ice hockey player (1938–2025)

- Born: November 1, 1938 Grand Falls, New Brunswick, Canada
- Died: October 6, 2025 (aged 86) Saint-Léonard, New Brunswick, Canada
- Height: 5 ft 9 in (175 cm)
- Weight: 170 lb (77 kg; 12 st 2 lb)
- Position: Right wing
- Shot: Right
- Played for: Boston Bruins
- Playing career: 1959–1971

Gerald Adrian Ouellette (November 1, 1938 – October 6, 2025) was a Canadian professional ice hockey player who played 34 games in the National Hockey League during the 1960–61 season with the Boston Bruins. The rest of his career, which lasted from 1959 to 1971, was spent in various minor leagues.

During his brief stint with the Boston Bruins in 1960–61, Ouellette scored 9 points including 4 goals. He returned to the Bruins farm teams for four seasons before being picked up by the Buffalo Bisons of the American Hockey League (AHL). With the Bisons, Ouellette served as team captain during their 1969–70 Calder Cup championship win. He then captained the Omaha Knights of the Central Hockey League (CHL) to the Adams Cup in 1970–71 and later joined the Campbellton Tigers of the North Shore New Brunswick senior league where he helped them win the Hardy Cup in 1972, 1977 and 1988; the last two wins as coach. Ouellette died in Saint-Leonard, Quebec on October 6, 2025, at the age of 86.

== Career statistics ==
=== Regular season and playoffs ===
			Regular season					Playoffs
Season	Team	League	GP	G	A	Pts	PIM	GP	G	A	Pts	PIM
1959–60	Kingston Frontenacs	EPHL	64	35	42	77	23	—	—	—	—	—
1960–61	Boston Bruins	NHL	34	4	5	9	0	—	—	—	—	—
1960–61	Kingston Frontenacs	EPHL	21	13	5	18	4	3	1	2	3	0
1961–62	Kingston Frontenacs	EPHL	32	15	10	25	11	—	—	—	—	—
1961–62	Providence Reds	AHL	34	8	14	22	4	—	—	—	—	—
1962–63	Kingston Frontenacs	EPHL	61	31	42	73	10	—	—	—	—	—
1963–64	Minneapolis Bruins	CHL	69	32	47	79	4	5	0	2	2	2
1964–65	Minneapolis Bruins	CHL	57	24	36	60	8	5	1	3	4	0
1964–65	San Francisco Seals	WHL	7	1	0	1	0	—	—	—	—	—
1965–66	Buffalo Bisons	AHL	72	11	21	32	6	—	—	—	—	—
1966–67	Buffalo Bisons	AHL	66	17	20	37	8	—	—	—	—	—
1967–68	Buffalo Bisons	AHL	66	18	32	50	6	5	0	6	6	2
1968–69	Buffalo Bisons	AHL	74	25	37	62	12	6	4	1	5	4
1969–70	Buffalo Bisons	AHL	67	26	46	72	10	11	2	7	9	2
1970–71	Omaha Knights	CHL	71	23	58	81	14	11	5	13	18	0
1974–75	Campbellton Tigers	NNBHL	—	5	9	14	0	—	—	—	—	—
1975–76	Cambellton Tigers	NNBHL	—	10	16	26	4	—	—	—	—	—
AHL totals			379	105	170	275	46	22	6	14	20	8
NHL totals			34	4	5	9	0	—	—	—	—	—

Preceded by Dan Johnson	CHL Most Valuable Player Award; 1970–71^{shared with Andre Dupont; Peter McDuffe; Joe Zanussi}	Succeeded by Gregg Sheppard
