= John LeBlanc =

Canadian ice hockey player

- Born: January 21, 1964 (age 61); Campbellton, New Brunswick, Canada
- Height: 6 ft 1 in (185 cm)
- Weight: 190 lb (86 kg; 13 st 8 lb)
- Position: Left wing
- Shot: Left
- Played for: Vancouver Canucks; Edmonton Oilers; Winnipeg Jets
- NHL draft: Undrafted
- Playing career: 1986–2001

John Glenn LeBlanc (born January 21, 1964) is a former Canadian professional ice hockey left winger. He played 83 games in the National Hockey League with the Vancouver Canucks, Edmonton Oilers, and Winnipeg Jets. He scored 26 goals and 13 assists in his NHL career.

His best professional season came in 1989-90 when, as a member of the Cape Breton Oilers, he led all American Hockey League scorers with 54 regular-season goals.

== Career statistics ==
=== Regular season and playoffs ===
			Regular season					Playoffs
Season	Team	League	GP	G	A	Pts	PIM	GP	G	A	Pts	PIM
1982–83	Mount Allison University	CIAU	20	21	26	47	10	—	—	—	—	—
1983–84	Hull Olympiques	QMJHL	69	39	35	74	32	—	—	—	—	—
1984–85	University of New Brunswick	CIAU	24	25	32	57	24	—	—	—	—	—
1985–86	University of New Brunswick	CIAU	24	38	26	64	34	—	—	—	—	—
1985–86	Canadian National Team	Intl	3	1	1	2	0	—	—	—	—	—
1986–87	Fredericton Express	AHL	75	40	30	70	27	—	—	—	—	—
1986–87	Vancouver Canucks	NHL	2	1	0	1	0	—	—	—	—	—
1987–88	Fredericton Express	AHL	35	26	25	51	54	15	6	7	13	34
1987–88	Vancouver Canucks	NHL	41	12	10	22	18	—	—	—	—	—
1988–89	Edmonton Oilers	NHL	2	1	0	1	0	1	0	0	0	0
1988–89	Cape Breton Oilers	AHL	3	4	0	4	0	—	—	—	—	—
1988–89	Milwaukee Admirals	IHL	61	39	31	70	42	—	—	—	—	—
1989–90	Cape Breton Oilers	AHL	77	54	34	88	50	6	4	0	4	4
1991–92	Moncton Hawks	AHL	56	31	22	53	24	10	3	2	5	8
1991–92	Winnipeg Jets	NHL	16	6	1	7	6	—	—	—	—	—
1992–93	Moncton Hawks	AHL	77	48	40	88	29	5	2	1	3	6
1992–93	Winnipeg Jets	NHL	3	0	0	0	2	—	—	—	—	—
1993–94	Moncton Hawks	AHL	41	25	26	51	38	20	3	6	9	6
1993–94	Winnipeg Jets	NHL	17	6	2	8	2	—	—	—	—	—
1994–95	Springfield Falcons	AHL	65	39	34	73	32	—	—	—	—	—
1994–95	Winnipeg Jets	NHL	2	0	0	0	0	—	—	—	—	—
1995–96	Orlando Solar Bears	IHL	60	22	24	46	20	—	—	—	—	—
1995–96	Fort Wayne Komets	IHL	16	12	11	23	4	5	0	2	2	14
1996–97	Fort Wayne Komets	IHL	77	30	31	61	22	—	—	—	—	—
1997–98	Utah Grizzlies	IHL	69	25	17	42	16	2	0	0	0	2
1999–2000	Causapscal Forestiers	LHSBSL	2	4	1	5	0	—	—	—	—	—
2000–01	Cauaspscal Forestiers	LHSBSL	32	55	41	96	18	6	4	7	11	10
2000–01	Bakersfield Condors	WCHL	9	6	3	9	2	3	0	0	0	0
AHL totals			429	267	211	478	254	56	18	16	34	58
NHL totals			83	26	13	39	28	1	0	0	0	0
IHL totals			283	128	114	242	104	7	0	2	2	16
