= Henry A. Austin =

Canadian politician

Henry Albert Austin (February 11, 1833 – June 6, 1911) was a merchant and political figure in New Brunswick. He represented Saint John County in the Legislative Assembly of New Brunswick from 1875 to 1878.

He was born in Scotchtown, Queens County, New Brunswick, a descendant of United Empire Loyalists, and was educated in Sackville. In 1876, he married Minnie R. Eaton. He was a director of the St. John Industrial School and also served as a member of the Portland town council.
