= Corinne Gallant =

Canadian academic (1922–2018)

Corinne Gallant CM
- Born: 1922; Dieppe, New Brunswick, Canada
- Died: 24 July 2018 (aged 96); Moncton, New Brunswick, Canada
- Education: Université de Moncton (Ph.D.)
- Occupation: Professor of philosophy
- Years active: 1968–1994
- Title: Professor emeritus

Corinne Gallant CM (1922 – 24 July 2018) was a Canadian professor emeritus and feminist. She held the office of Vice-Dean of the Faculty of Arts and director of the philosophy program at the Université de Moncton. As a feminist leader, she co-chaired a working committee that led to the creation of the New Brunswick Advisory Council on the Status of Women and chaired the Canadian Research Institute for the Advancement of Women. She was made a member of the Order of Canada in 1988 and received the Order of Moncton in 2012.

== Biography ==
Gallant was born in Moncton, New Brunswick, Canada, in 1922. She was a member of the Sisters of Our Lady of the Sacred Heart (French: Notre-Dame-du-Sacré-Cœur) for 26 years before becoming a lay person in 1970. One of the first Acadian women to earn a doctorate, Gallant taught philosophy at the Université de Moncton for many years and became director of the philosophy program and Vice-Dean of the Faculty of Arts.

Gallant has made many commitments to the advancement of women. She created one of the first women's courses in Canada. Eighty women from this evening class continued meeting and in 1968 formed Moncton's first feminist group, La Fédération des dames d'Acadie. Gallant supported the 1973 foundation of a provincial organization to promote women's causes. She was a board member of Crossroad for Women, a shelter for women and children fleeing abuse, from 1985 to 1988. In 1989, she co-chaired a working committee that led to the creation of the New Brunswick Advisory Council on the Status of Women and remained an active member until 1994. Gallant also chaired the Canadian Research Institute for the Advancement of Women (CRIAW). She retired in 1994.

Gallant was made a member of the Order of Canada in 1988 and received the Queen's Golden Jubilee Medal. Gallant was made a professor emeritus at the University of Moncton and received the Order of Moncton. She also received the 2012 Governor General's Award for the advancement of women's equality.

At the end of 2012, in celebration of the 50th anniversary of the University of Moncton, Simone LeBlanc-Rainville released the book Corinne Gallant: A Pioneer of Feminism in Acadia as the first volume of the "Mémoire biographique" collection of the Institut d'études acadiennes. The collection honours Acadians who have contributed to the development of their society.

Gallant died at CHU Dumont hospital in Moncton on 24 July 2018.

== Awards and honours ==
- 125th Anniversary of the Confederation of Canada Medal
- Member of the Order of Canada, 1988
- Queen's Golden Jubilee Medal, 2002
- Order of Moncton, 2012
- Governor General's Award for the advancement of women's equality, 2012
- New Brunswick Human Rights Award, 2014
