= Alfred A. Green =

American politician

Alfred A. Green (24 February 1828 – 3 March 1899) was a Canadian–born political and civic figure in nineteenth–century California. He also served in the Mexican–American War.

== Biography ==
Alfred A. Green was born in Miramichi, New Brunswick, Canada. He served in the California legislature and during the Mexican–American War served in the US Army. He came to San Francisco as a member of Colonel Stevenson's regiment In 1847. He was a member of The Society of California Pioneers. Green was instrumental in defeating several fraudulent land grants in early San Francisco. In 1853 he served as a member of the Sonoma Town Council.

In 1862 he was living on Montgomery Street (between Pacific Street and Broadway Street) with his brother Benjamin S. Green according to the San Francisco Directory.

Green was involved in a lawsuit with the Mexican government regarding the San Rafael de la Zanja land grant (around 20,000 acres in what is now the US state of Arizona) in the late 1880s.

He died in San Francisco on 3 March 1899, of stomach cancer.

== Bibliography ==
- Life and Adventures of a 47er of California, 1878, California
