= Ty LaForest =

Canadian baseball player (1917–1947)

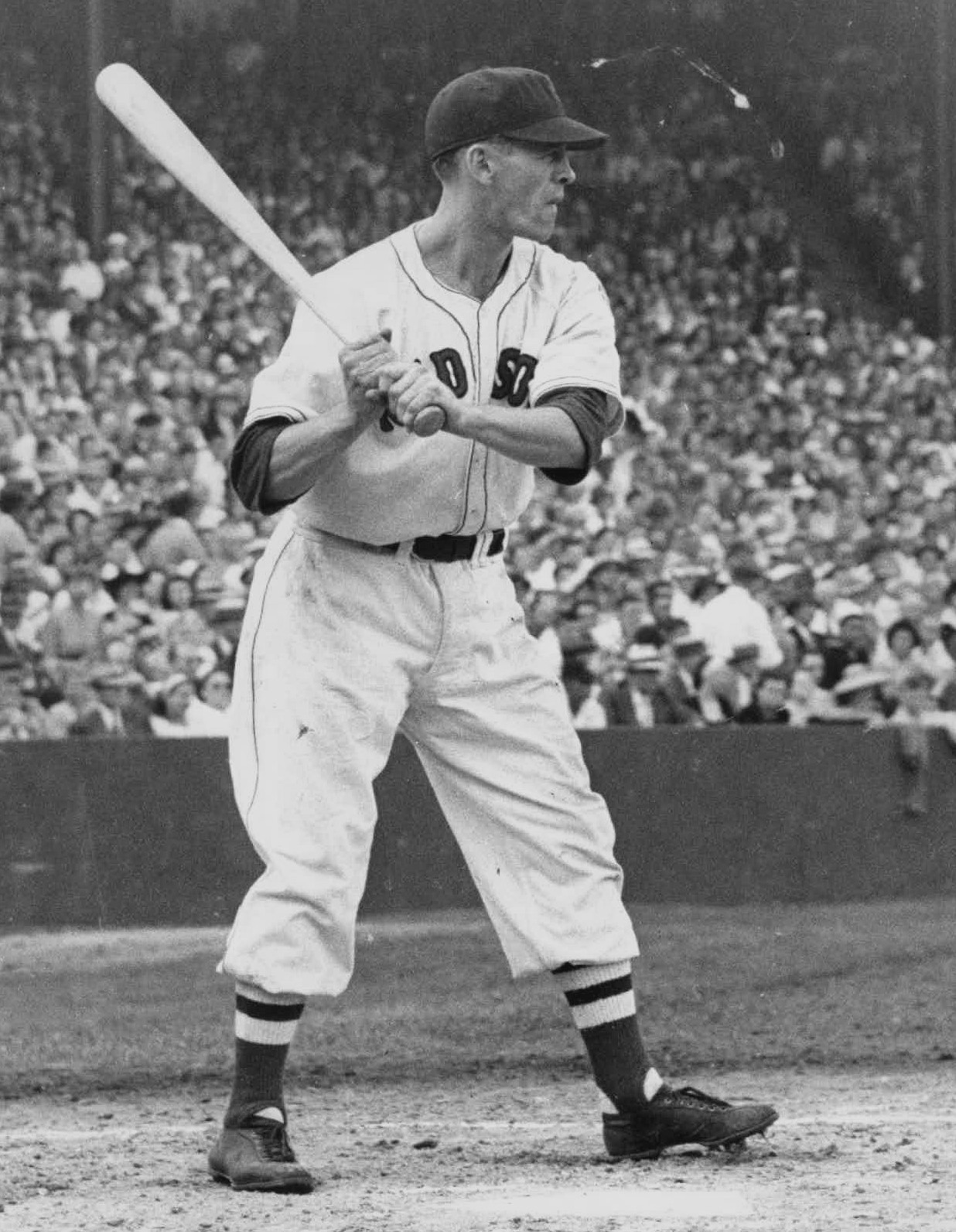
- Third baseman
- Born: April 18, 1917; Edmundston, New Brunswick, Canada
- Died: May 5, 1947 (aged 30); Arlington, Massachusetts, U.S.
- Batted: Right Threw: Right

MLB debut
- August 4, 1945, for the Boston Red Sox

Last MLB appearance
- September 30, 1945, for the Boston Red Sox

MLB statistics
- Batting average: .250
- Home runs: 2
- Runs batted in: 16
- Stats at Baseball Reference

Teams
- Boston Red Sox (1945)

Byron Joseph LaForest (April 18, 1917 – May 5, 1947) was a Canadian professional baseball player who appeared in 52 games in the major leagues, primarily as a third baseman, for the Boston Red Sox during the latter months of the 1945 season. He was born in Edmundston, New Brunswick, and emigrated with his family to the United States in 1921. He attended Waltham High School in the Boston suburb and graduated from Dorchester High School. Listed as 5 feet 9 inches (1.75 m) tall and 165 pounds (75 kg), he threw and batted right-handed.

During his MLB tenure, LaForest hit .250 (51-for-204) with two home runs, 16 RBI, and 25 runs scored in 52 games. He was an above-average defensive player, making just five errors in 147 total chances at third base, and recording six putouts (with no errors) in five appearances as an outfielder.

LaForest is one of many ballplayers who only appeared in the major leagues during World War II. He began his professional career at the age of 26 in 1943 in the Red Sox' farm system. In 1944, LaForest played in the outfield for Scranton of the Eastern League. He hit .296 with 101 runs batted in, which earned him a promotion in 1945 to the top Red Sox farm club, the Louisville Colonels. There, he tied an American Association record by getting six hits in six at bats in a game against Minneapolis.

He made his big-league debut on August 4, 1945, playing third base in both ends of a doubleheader against the Washington Senators at Griffith Stadium. Three weeks and an extended road trip later, on August 26, 1945, he made his Fenway Park debut during a twin bill against the Philadelphia Athletics. During those two games, LaForest had two home runs and five hits over the two games to lead the Red Sox to a pair of victories. Later that week, Laforest singled and scored the only run of the game to help the Red Sox defeat the New York Yankees. On August 31, he had four more hits, including two triples, in another double header with Philadelphia.

He spent the 1946 season at the Triple-A level, with Louisville and Toronto, hitting a composite .228. It was his last season in baseball.

LaForest was stricken by pneumonia that winter. Still weakened from his illness, he suffered a heart attack in Florida during spring training in 1947, and died at age 30 on May 5 at Arlington, Massachusetts. He was inducted into the Boston Park League Baseball Hall of Fame in 1986.

== See also ==
- Shearon, Jim (1994). Canada's Baseball Legends. Malin Head Press. ISBN 978-0-9698039-0-4.
