= Anne Quinlan =

Irish-born Canadian educator

Anne Quinlan (June 7, 1839 – February 18, 1923) was an Irish-born Canadian educator.

The daughter of William Quinlan, a shoemaker, and Susan Medill, she was born in County Tipperary and came to Chatham, New Brunswick with her parents while still a child. Quinlan was educated there and decided to become a teacher. She took a three-month program at a training school in St. John in 1856 and began teaching in Chatham the following year; she later upgraded her qualifications to a first class teaching certificate. In 1862, she began operating a school known as St. Michael's Female Academy in the Catholic Temperance Hall. When public support for Catholic schools was ended in 1871, the Religious Hospitallers of St. Joseph of Montreal were invited to establish a girls' school in Chatham. St. Michael's Academy was opened in October 1871; Quinlan was effectively in charge of the school during the 1870s and 1880s. She also served on the management of the Northumberland County Teachers' Institute.

She retired from teaching at the age of 50 due to unspecified health problems. In 1896, she was named to the first Board of School Trustees for the town of Chatham, serving until 1900. She continued to teach privately from her home and, after 1900, from the Hôtel-Dieu hospital.

Quinlan died in Chatham at the age of 83.
