= Joseph Bérubé =

Ombudsman of New Brunswick, Canada

Joseph Edward Bérubé was the longest serving Ombudsman of the province of New Brunswick, Canada, occupying the office from 1976 to 1993.

== History ==
Joseph Bérubé was a native of Edmundston, New Brunswick. Following his graduation in law from the University of New Brunswick, he was called to the New Brunswick Bar in 1957 and to the Ontario Bar in 1958. Prior to assuming the role of Ombudsman in 1976, Bérubé had been a New Brunswick Provincial Court judge since 1965, following a period in private practice. Prior to accepting the appointment as Ombudsman, Bérubé had been the President of the New Brunswick Provincial Court Judges' Association, as well as the President of the Canadian Association of Provincial Court Judges.

In 1991, Bérubé and the New Brunswick Ombudsman Office initiated an inquiry into the 1987 collapse of the Principal Group and its effect on residents of New Brunswick. The focus of the inquiry related to the activities in New Brunswick of First Investors Corporation, one of the main operating corporations of the Principal Group. In addition, in its 1991 annual report, released in 1992, the Office of the Ombudsman of New Brunswick disclosed that it had "investigated a complaint lodged on behalf of 3,252 mostly elderly persons of limited means who suffered severe financial loss following the collapse of First Investors Corporation".
