= John Babbitt =

John Babbitt (15 October 1845 – 10 December 1889) was a jeweller and watchmaker by profession. He was also fascinated by the scientific advances of his time such as the telephone and other inventions by people like Alexander Graham Bell and Thomas Alva Edison.

In 1879, Loring Bailey and Babbitt produced the first electric light in Fredericton. Babbitt also made a phonograph believed to have been the first in New Brunswick. Babbitt sometimes participated in experimental work at the University of New Brunswick and other locations and co-exhibited to a Saint John audience, for the first time, a number of scientific products.
