= Lemuel John Tweedie =

Canadian politician (1849–1917)

The Honourable Lemuel John Tweedie
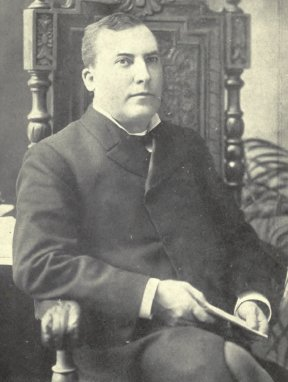
- Tweedie in 1909

10th Premier of New Brunswick
- In office August 31, 1900 – March 6, 1907
- Monarchs: Victoria; Edward VII
- Lieutenant Governor: Abner Reid McClelan; Jabez Bunting Snowball; Himself
- Preceded by: Henry Robert Emmerson
- Succeeded by: William Pugsley

12th Lieutenant Governor of New Brunswick
- In office March 6, 1907 – March 6, 1912
- Monarchs: Edward VII; George V
- Governors General: The Earl Grey; The Duke of Connaught and Strathearn
- Premier: William Pugsley; Clifford W. Robinson; J. Douglas Hazen; James K. Flemming
- Preceded by: Jabez Bunting Snowball
- Succeeded by: Josiah Wood

MLA for Northumberland
- In office June 13, 1874 – June 8, 1878 Serving with William Swim, William Moore Kelly, Allan A. Davidson
- Preceded by: Michael Adams
- Succeeded by: Thomas F. Gillespie
- In office April 26, 1886 – March 6, 1907 Serving with Michael Adams, John Percival Burchill, John Morrissy, William A. Park, James Robinson, Allan A. Davidson, Charles Elijah Fish, W. S. Loggie, Ernest Hutchinson, John O'Brien, Donald Morrison
- Preceded by: Thomas F. Gillespie
- Succeeded by: Daniel P. McLachlan

Personal details
- Born: November 30, 1849 Chatham, New Brunswick, Canada
- Died: July 15, 1917 (aged 67) Chatham, New Brunswick, Canada
- Party: Liberal
- Spouse: Agnes Loudoun (m. 1876)
- Children: 4 sons and 2 daughters
- Education: Presbyterian Academy
- Occupation: Lawyer
- Profession: Politician

Lemuel John Tweedie (November 30, 1849 – July 15, 1917) was a Canadian politician.

His law partner in Chatham, New Brunswick for a time was Richard Bedford Bennett, later Prime Minister of Canada; and for a time Max Aitken was his office boy.

A former supporter of the federal Conservatives, he joined the Liberal Cabinet of New Brunswick Premier Andrew George Blair serving as Surveyor-General and Provincial Secretary in successive Liberal governments. Tweedie became the tenth premier of New Brunswick in 1900 and led the party to a large majority government in the 1903 election.

Tweedie's government allowed women to be admitted to the practice of law in 1906 and supported the development of hydroelectric power at Grand Falls. He also created a Workers' Compensation board and successfully lobbied the federal government to increase subsidies to the province including payment for railway expansion. He led the government for seven years before becoming the 12th Lieutenant Governor of New Brunswick, holding that position until 1912.

A supporter of educational institutions, Tweedie personally donated academic prizes for students. He served on the Board of Governors of the University of New Brunswick, Mount Allison University, plus the Halifax School for the Blind.

Lemuel Tweedie died in 1917 at age sixty-seven in his home town of Chatham and was buried in the Riverside Cemetery. His son Frederick served as a member of the provincial assembly.
