= Miramichi Valley =

Valley in New Brunswick, Canada

Coordinates: 46.960°N 65.630°W

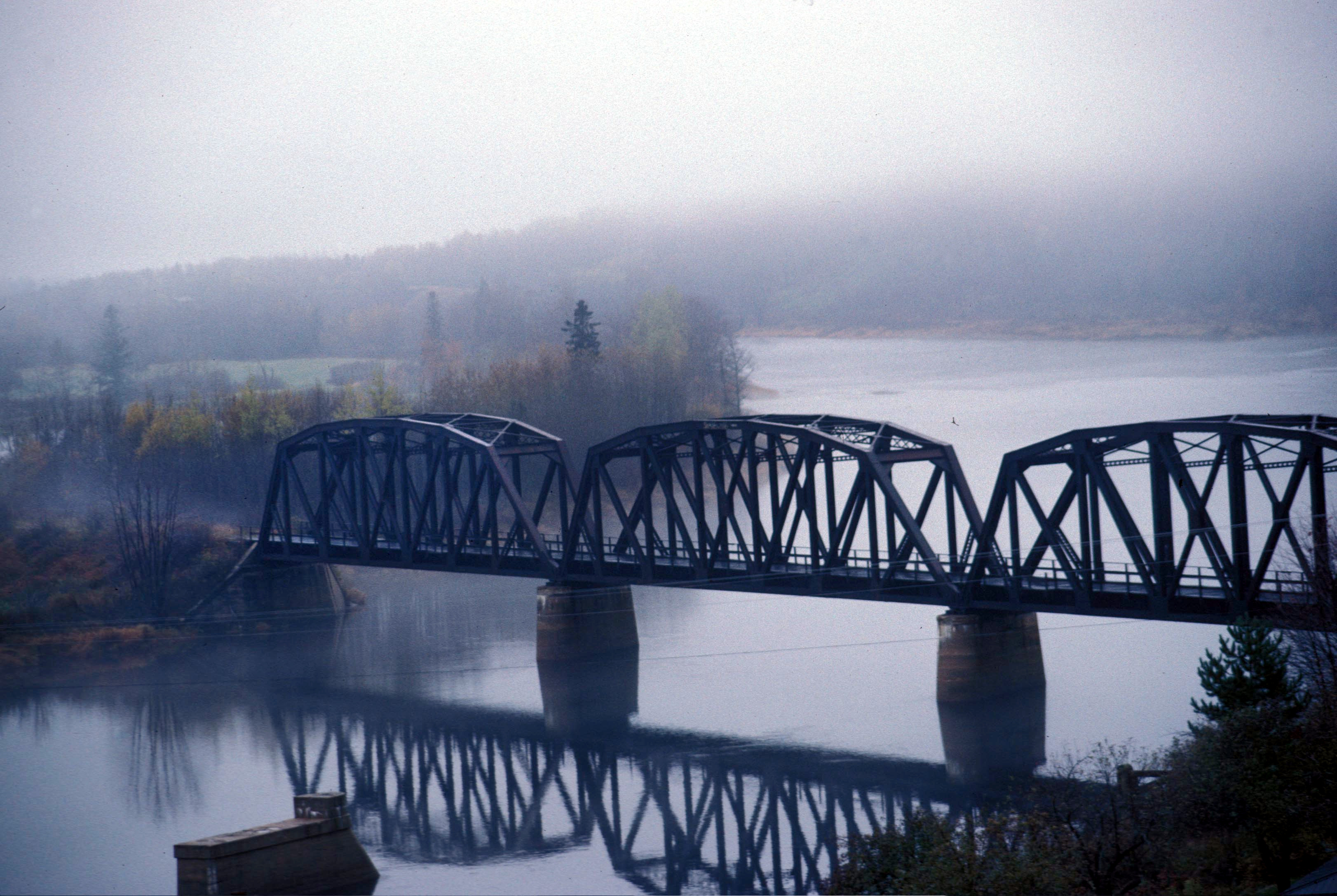
The abandoned Canada Eastern Railway bridge over the Southwest Miramichi River at Doaktown.

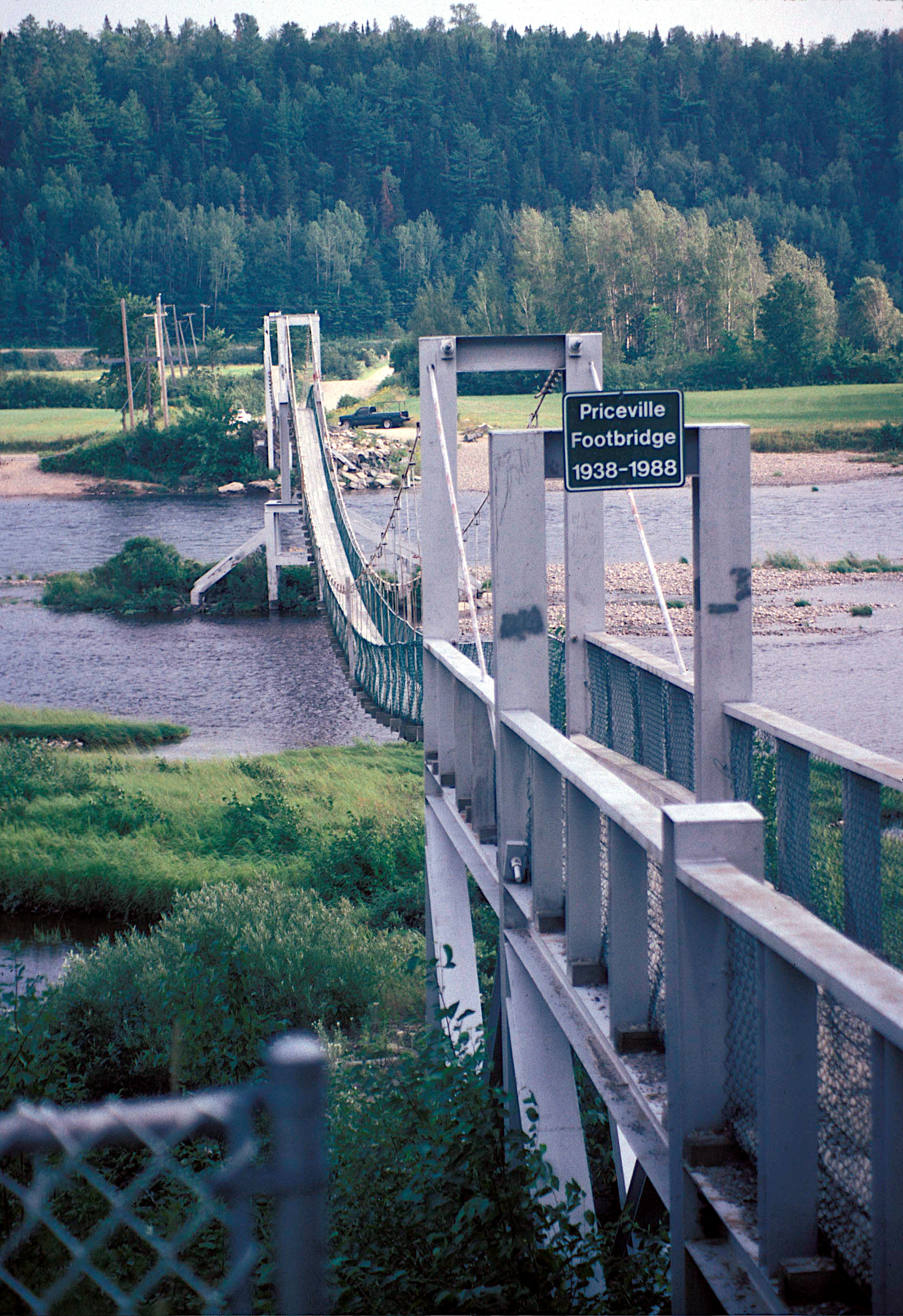
Priceville Footbridge spanning the Main Southwest Miramichi River.

The Miramichi Valley is a Canadian river valley and region in the east-central part of New Brunswick. It extends along both major branches of the Miramichi River and their tributaries, however it is generally agreed that the much larger Southwest Miramichi River forms the majority of this region as it is more settled than the Northwest Miramichi River.

Some communities throughout the valley include (from upriver to downriver): Juniper, Boiestown, Doaktown, Miramichi River Valley, Red Bank, Sunny Corner, Renous-Quarryville, and the city of Miramichi which is an amalgamation of the former towns of Newcastle and Chatham, as well as the former villages of Nelson-Miramichi, Loggieville and Douglastown.

There are three Mi'kmaq reserves within the Miramichi River watershed: Natoaganeg (Eel Ground) First Nation, Esgenoôpetitj (Burnt Church) First Nation, and Metepenagiag (Red Bank) Mi'kmaq Nation.

== Climate ==
Largely influenced by the continental climate, the Miramichi River valley typically experiences westerly winds from the interior, although coastal areas of the estuarine portion can experience easterly winds off the Gulf of St. Lawrence during the late summer. During fall, winter and spring, the colder air mass of the northern interior of North America frequently flows over the Miramichi Valley, but the close proximity of the Gulf of St. Lawrence tends to moderate this effect.

The colder waters of the Gulf of St. Lawrence also moderate the spring and summer months, producing a later spring than corresponding areas further inland, due to sea ice. Falls are correspondingly later, since the waters of the Gulf of St. Lawerence retain heat for a longer period than the areas inland.

The Miramichi River and its estuarine portion traditionally freezes solid for three to four months each winter. This is beginning to change as a result of changing climate trends, however as late as the 1950s, before a bridge was built at Chatham, NB, cars would regularly cross the river using the ice, and small trucks of fish buyers would venture down river on the ice to purchase smelt directly from ice fishermen at their nets.

The average rainfall is in the order of 1-1.1 m.

== Forests ==
Lying near the northern limit of many eastern hardwoods in the Acadian Forest Region, Miramichi Valley forests are diverse.

Balsam fir, black spruce and red spruce are common. Other coniferous trees include white spruce, eastern white pine, red pine, jack pine, tamarack, eastern hemlock, and eastern white cedar).

Broad-leaved deciduous trees include yellow birch, paper birch, grey birch, red maple, sugar maple, balsam poplar, trembling aspen, bigtooth aspen, speckled alder, northern red oak, American elm, American beech, and black ash. Silver maple and butternut are uncommon, but can be found at alluvial sites along the Southwest Miramichi River. Hop hornbeam (=Ironwood) and white ash are uncommon to rare, but do occur on well-drained upland soils.

Land ownership in the Miramichi River valley reflects human settlement patterns, with most private land ownership having been derived from the Crown grant and extending inland, perpendicular to the river and its tributaries. Many families maintain private woodlots for firewood or commercial uses. Remaining Crown land, inland from the river, is managed by the New Brunswick Department of Natural Resources. These lands have been managed primarily to support the pulp and paper industry via timber leases to forestry companies. Controversy has arisen in recent decades about forest management practises which have included clear cutting.

== Agriculture ==
The Miramichi River valley supports some farming, mostly located on the better topsoils within the floodplain. Crop farming is rare, with potatoes, turnips, oats, and wheat being most common. Some residents maintain small vegetable gardens for personal use in communities throughout the valley. Dairy farming is common, as is cultivation of blueberries, strawberries, raspberries and cranberries. Some failed farms which had been cleared in colonial times have reverted to forest.

Although not strictly agriculture, the Miramichi River valley also sees an annual spring harvest of wild "fiddleheads", the curled heads of ostrich ferns which grow on the riverbanks and in the floodplain after the spring freshet.

== Fishing ==
The Miramichi River is a popular fishing area, famous for Atlantic Salmon fly-fishing (rod and reel), The estuary once supported an extensive fishery for salmon, shad, gaspereau and smelt. Although these commercial harvests have declined (commercial fishing of Atlantic Salmon having been banned since the 1960s), the lobster fishery has grown to become the highest value food fishery in the region, with the lobster fleet sailing primarily out of ports such as Neguac, Hardwicke, Baie-Sainte-Anne, and Escuminac. The Miramichi River estuary also supports some oyster harvesting and aquaculture, particularly cultivated mussels.

Most commercial fish stocks have been in a state of decline, particularly Atlantic Salmon. Despite these declines, the Miramichi River still supports one of the largest annual runs of Atlantic salmon in North America. These declines in Atlantic salmon runs are often blamed on the Greenland offshore fishery, global climate change, as well as local overfishing. Recent forest management practises such as clear cutting and herbicide applications which denigrate the riparian zone along the river and its tributaries, as well as industrial pollution share some blame as well.

== Wildlife ==
The Miramichi River watershed supports a large population of land mammals and waterfowl, particularly white-tailed deer, eastern moose, American black bear, ducks and the Canada goose. Other animals include red fox, northeastern coyote, American mink, fisher, weasel, striped skunk, North American porcupine, North American beaver, and muskrat among many others.

Prior to European settlement, the area also supported boreal woodland caribou, as well as the eastern cougar and eastern wolves. A remnant population of the cougar is thought to inhabit parts of New Brunswick and Quebec's Gaspé Peninsula, possibly including the Miramichi River watershed. An eastern wolf pack is thought to have recently returned to the Miramichi Highlands from the Gaspé Peninsula.

Hunting of large land mammals such as deer, moose, as well as waterfowl such as ducks and geese is permitted each fall. The elusive American black duck is particularly prized by hunters. There is a limited bear hunt each spring, although its continuation is being debated. The guiding industry is an economic contributor to the local economy during hunting season.

== History ==
=== Pre-history to 1758 ===
Originally settled by Maritime Archaic Indians, the Miramichi River valley was controlled by the Mi'kmaq Nation at the time of European discovery. As part of Acadia under French colonial control, the region saw little French settlement. The Mi'kmaq from the Miramichi River valley sided with France during the wars between Britain and France from 1689 to 1763, sometimes sending raiding parties into New England to attack settlements during the Seven Years' War.

Following the siege of Fortress Louisbourg in 1758, British forces on their way to Quebec City attacked French settlements on Ile-Saint-Jean (present-day Prince Edward Island) and continued along the coast, where they entered the lower Miramichi River valley and destroyed and scattered the small Acadian settlements. They also attacked and burned a small Mi'kmaq village at Ste-Anne (present-day Burnt Church, NB).

=== 1758 to 1850 ===
The Miramichi River valley initially became a refuge for Acadians fleeing the Great Upheaval in the Annapolis Valley, Tantramar Marshes and Ile-Saint-Jean following the Seven Years' War, however these families were soon forced to move to more isolated coastal areas to the northeast. Under British control, the area was part of the Colony of Nova Scotia from 1756 to 1784 but was largely forgotten. Some settlement trickled from the Loyalist refugees flooding the Saint John River valley to the south and west, however it was only after the Colony of New Brunswick was established in 1784 that colonial administrators looked favourably upon the Miramichi region.

The Highland Clearances and Britain's Industrial Revolution soon saw a Scottish migration into the Miramichi River valley, some of them demobilized veterans of the American Revolutionary War, and others directly coming from the Scottish Highlands. They were the first permanent English-speaking settlers and their early industriousness continues as a legacy to the various communities throughout the valley.

William Davidson was among the first Scots, arriving in 1767. English settlers were present too, as evidenced by the Anglican Churches established throughout the valley. Acadians began to drift back into the area as early as 1769, settling the shorelands along the lower bay. A small number of United Empire Loyalists arrived, establishing themselves particularly in the upriver areas, where Squire Doak established the village of Doaktown. In 1825, a massive forest fire, called "The Great Miramichi Fire", burned 20% of New Brunswick's forests, leveling several communities in the central part of the colony including Newcastle and Douglastown.

Large numbers of Irish arrived in the Miramichi River valley, both before and after the Great Famine of Ireland (1845-1849). Middle Island, in the inner bay of the estuarine portion of the Miramichi River, served as a quarantine station. Though some Irish immigrants farmed, especially in Barnaby River, St. Margarets and Sevogle River, many were drawn to the established towns and villages, perhaps because the Scots and English had taken up the best land.

Trade with Britain and the West Indies was a cornerstone of the Miramichi River valley economy throughout a large part of the 19th century. An important export up until the 1850s was Eastern White Pine trunks which were used as masts on Royal Navy vessels. Fur was an early export to European markets and later exports included lumber, pulpwood, and pit props for Welsh coal mines. The United States began to replace Britain as the most important market for the Miramichi River valley after the 1850s. Salmon and forest products found a market in Boston, MA, with these commodities being shipped by schooner, with rum and molasses being common return cargoes.

=== 1867 to present ===
The National Policy of Sir John A. Macdonald's Conservative government after Confederation in 1867 was not to the advantage of Miramichi lumbermen and fish buyers. The high tariff walls designed to protect Ontario manufacturers meant higher prices for imports, and tariff barriers on exports to the United States.

The National Policy is believed to be a contributing factor in explaining the long Liberal predominance in Miramichi elections, and the prominence of lumber and fish merchants and business leaders among Liberal MPs and Senators in the Parliament of Canada and Members of the Legislative Assembly of New Brunswick. Notable among these are Senators Jabez Bunting Snowball, a lumber merchant and shipowner from Chatham, NB, and Percy Burchill, a lumber merchant from Nelson-Miramichi, NB; Members of Parliament included W. S. Loggie, a fish and general merchant from Chatham, NB, Richard Hutchinson, a lumber merchant from Newcastle, NB, and John Maloney, a lumber merchant; Members of the Legislative Assembly included W. Stafford Anderson, a lumber merchant from Newcastle, NB, whose daughter Margaret Anderson served in the Senate.

Sawmills were a typical Miramichi industry from colonial times, but pulp mills were established at both Newcastle and Chatham in the late nineteenth century and, though the Chatham mill is long closed, the one in Newcastle continued in operation until recently. Fish packing remained important until recent times, with Loggieville and Escuminac being two sites. For many years, pit props were exported to the Welsh and English coal mines, though the volume suggests that many ended up in British pulp mills.

During the 1870s and 1880s, railways were built to the Miramichi River valley, beginning with the Intercolonial Railway in 1875, which crossed the Southwest and Northwest Miramichi Rivers at tidewater just upstream from Newcastle on its way between Moncton, NB and Bathurst, NB. This section of the Intercolonial formed part of the Halifax, NS to Rivière-du-Loup, QC main line and was purposely routed along the eastern shore of New Brunswick for military purposes, to keep it away from the border with the United States.

The Northern and Western Railway (later the Canada Eastern Railway) was built in the mid-1880s from Fredericton to Boisetown where it then ran along the Southwest Miramichi River through Chatham to terminate at the port at Loggieville, intersecting with the Intercolonial at Nelson. The line was purchased several years later by the Intercolonial and part of the line between Renous-Quarryville and Nelson was rerouted. A passenger train on this route was given the informal nickname, the "Dungarvon Whooper".

Oceangoing steamships and motor vessels regularly visited ports along the river until fairly recently. The decision by the federal government to concentrate all ocean shipping activities in northern New Brunswick at the port of Belledune, NB in the late 1980s and early 1990s led to a decision by the mid-1990s to discontinue dredging at the entrance to Miramichi Bay. This has led to significant silting of the navigation channel although some ships still call at the ports of Chatham and Newcastle.

The Miramichi River valley is home to about 45,000 people, mainly of mixed Irish, Scottish, English, French and Mi'kmaq descent. Traditionally, the shores of the estuarine portion of the Miramichi River valley were predominantly Acadian fishing communities, whereas Chatham was an Irish community and Newcastle and many towns upriver were Scottish communities. Over the past 100 years or more, Acadians have been migrating into the amalgamated city of Miramichi and surrounding areas. The "English speaking" community (of Irish, Scottish or English descent) and the "French speaking" community (of Acadian descent) have witnessed much intermarriage between the two groups in the last 80 years and relations are generally good.

There has been little immigration to the Miramichi River valley since the Irish Famine, producing a particular personality among Miramichiers who are regarded as friendly, but with a touch of reserve, generous, but also very independent, and with a wry sense of humour, especially in evidence when someone is suspected of "putting on airs". They are passionately attached to their valley.

Another factor that united Miramichiers of all ethnic backgrounds was the shared experience of two world wars. Casualties were especially heavy in the First World War, when just about every street in the towns throughout the river valley had men killed or returned wounded and/or shell-shocked. During the Second World War Miramichi River valley soldiers went ashore on D-Day with the North Shore Regiment and went through the heavy fighting in northern France, Belgium, and the Netherlands. Others served with the Royal Canadian Air Force and the Royal Canadian Navy.

== Historic sites ==
- Middle Island, the site of a quarantine station in the inner part of Miramichi Bay. Preserved to commemorate the Irish immigration to the Miramichi River valley.
- MacDonald Farm, at the mouth of the Bartibogue River. A restoration of an original Scottish settler's home.
- St. Michael's Basilica, located in the former town of Chatham, NB. The largest church in the Miramichi River valley and centre of the Irish community.

== See also ==
- People of Ireland
- Dungarvon Whooper
- William Davidson (lumberman)
- Martin Cranney
- William Stewart Loggie
- Jabez Bunting Snowball
- George Roy McWilliam
- Maurice Dionne
