= Frances Fish =

Canadian politician (1888–1975)

Frances Lilian Fish QC (December 18, 1888 – October 27, 1975), the daughter of Charles Elijah Fish, was the first female law school graduate and lawyer in Nova Scotia, the first woman to run for office in the New Brunswick legislature, and a prominent lawyer in Newcastle, New Brunswick.

Fish, a B.A. graduate of University of New Brunswick (1910), obtained an M.A. in classics from University of Chicago (about 1913), before completing her law degree at Dalhousie University in 1918. On September 10, 1918 she was the first woman called to the bar in Nova Scotia. At the time, women were not considered to be "persons" under the law. (see Persons Case)

Although she lived in Winnipeg, Ottawa and Toronto, she returned to Newcastle following her father's death in 1933. She was among the first six female lawyers in the province. She ran as the Reconstruction Party candidate for the Northumberland riding in the 1935 federal election, but was defeated by Liberal John Patrick Barry. She also ran as an unsuccessful Conservative Party candidate in the 1935 New Brunswick provincial election.

In 1947 she was named New Brunswick's first female deputy county magistrate, and was appointed a QC in 1972. The Frances Fish Women Lawyers Achievement Award, presented biennially by the Nova Scotia Association of Women and the Law, commemorates her achievements.
