= Frederick Tweedie =

Canadian politician

Frederick Morrison Tweedie (October 20, 1877 – June 5, 1943) was an industrialist and political figure in New Brunswick, Canada. He represented Northumberland County in the Legislative Assembly of New Brunswick from 1931 to 1943 as a Liberal member.

He was born in Chatham, New Brunswick, the son of Lemuel John Tweedie and Agnes Loudoun. In 1908, he married Frances Agnes Watt. Tweedie was president and manager of the Miramichi Foundry Machine Works. He served two years as mayor of Chatham.

In 1925, he was an unsuccessful candidate in the New Brunswick general election. That year he was also a candidate in the Northumberland riding in the 1925 federal election, losing to the Progressive Conservative Party of Canada candidate, Charles Elijah Fish.

He died in 1943.
