= George Roy McWilliam =

Canadian politician (1905–1977)

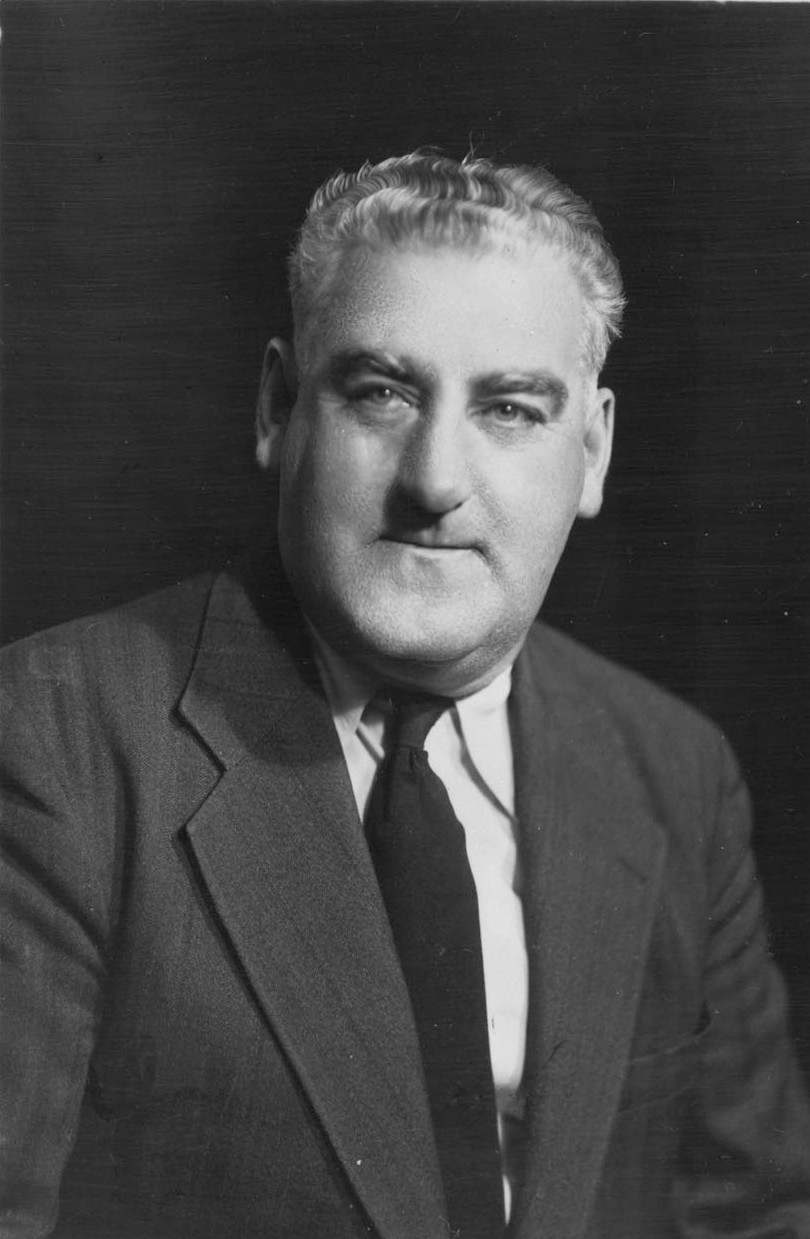

Member of Parliament for Northumberland—Miramichi
- In office 1949–1968
- Preceded by: John William Maloney
- Succeeded by: G. A. Percy Smith

Personal details
- Born: 21 July 1905 Sydney, Nova Scotia, Canada
- Died: 15 May 1977 (aged 71)
- Party: Liberal
- Profession: Editor; publisher

George Roy McWilliam (21 July 1905 – 15 May 1977) was a Member of Parliament in the Canadian House of Commons for the constituencies of Northumberland and Northumberland—Miramichi in New Brunswick from 1949 until 1968. He was a resident of Newcastle, New Brunswick for most of his life, where he was the publisher and editor of the North Shore Leader, a local weekly newspaper.

== Early life ==
McWilliam was born in Sydney, Nova Scotia.

== Political career ==
McWilliam was a Liberal and served as Parliamentary Secretary to the Postmaster-General from 1963 to 1964 and to the Minister of Public Works from 1964 to 1965.

McWilliam served as MP through the middle of a long period of Liberal ascendancy in the Miramichi Valley. The coalition that sustained the Liberal Party was centered on the Irish vote, especially from the town of Chatham where they formed the majority, buttressed by the votes of the Irish minority in Newcastle, and the smaller Irish villages like St. Margarets, Barnaby River and Sevogle. Added to this were the votes of the French-speaking Acadians of Neguac, Rogersville, Beaverbrook and Baie-Sainte-Anne and surrounding areas. The majority of Protestants voted Progressive Conservative, but there were always a minority who supported the Liberals.

Although Catholics generally supported the Liberal Party, the Irish Catholic clergy did not generally involve themselves in politics.

== Personal life ==
Roy McWilliam's sister was the noted Miramichi historian Edith McAllister.

== Electoral record ==
1953 Canadian federal election: Northumberland
Party	Candidate	Votes	%	±%
Liberal	George Roy McWilliam	10,666	64.33	+8.70
Progressive Conservative	George Somers	5,107	30.80	-8.66
Co-operative Commonwealth	Paul Lordon	808	4.87	+2.97
Total valid votes		16,581	100.00	

1949 Canadian federal election: Northumberland
Party	Candidate	Votes	%	±%
Liberal	George Roy McWilliam	9,840	55.63	-6.66
Progressive Conservative	Benjamin Cleland	6,980	39.46	+1.75
Independent	Elmer MacKinnon	533	3.01	Ø
Co-operative Commonwealth	Paul Hansen	336	1.90	Ø
Total valid votes		17,689	100.00	
