= John Morrissy =

Canadian politician

John Veriker Morrissy

Member of the Canadian Parliament for Northumberland
- In office 1921–1924
- Preceded by: William Stewart Loggie
- Succeeded by: William Bunting Snowball

Personal details
- Born: August 13, 1854 Newcastle, Colony of New Brunswick
- Died: July 31, 1924 (aged 69)
- Party: Liberal
- Children: Charles Joseph Morrissy
- Occupation: Merchant

John Veriker Morrissy (August 13, 1854 – July 31, 1924) was a merchant and political figure in New Brunswick, Canada. He represented Northumberland County in the Legislative Assembly of New Brunswick from 1888 to 1890 and from 1903 to 1916 and Northumberland in the House of Commons of Canada from 1921 to 1924 as a Liberal member.

He was born in Newcastle, Colony of New Brunswick, the son of Patrick Morrissy and Rose Farrell, both Irish immigrants, and entered business as a livery stable operator. In 1879, he married Joanna Agnes Dunn. He served on the council for Northumberland County from 1882 to 1883. Morrissy was elected to the provincial assembly in an 1888 by-election held after William A. Park resigned his seat. He served in the province's Executive Council as Minister of Public Works from 1908 to 1916. Morrissy ran unsuccessfully for a federal seat in 1896, 1900 and 1917. He died in office at the age of 69.

His son Charles Joseph Morrissy also served in the House of Commons. The Morrissy Bridge over the Miramichi River was named after John Morrissy.

== Electoral record ==
1900 Canadian federal election: Northumberland
Party	Candidate	Votes	%	±%
Conservative	James Robinson	2225	53.87	+5.53
Liberal	John Morrissy	1905	46.13	+8.81
Total valid votes		4130	100.00	

Change for Liberal candidate John Morrissy are based on the 1896 Liberal Party's results. His personal vote increased by 31.79% over his 1896 result running as an independent candidate.

1896 Canadian federal election: Northumberland
Party	Candidate	Votes	%	±%
Conservative	James Robinson	2,225	48.34	-7.71
Liberal	Peter Mitchell	1,718	37.32	-6.63
Independent	John Morrissy	660	14.34	Ø
Total valid votes		4,603	100.00	

1921 Canadian federal election: Northumberland
Party	Candidate	Votes	%	±%
Liberal	John Morrissy	6,706	55.93	+12.28
Conservative	Edward McCurdy	5,285	44.07	-12.28
Total valid votes		11,991	100.00	

1917 Canadian federal election: Northumberland
Party	Candidate	Votes	%	±%
Government (Unionist)	William Stewart Loggie	4,648	56.35	+9.69
Opposition (Laurier Liberals)	John Morrissy	3,601	43.65	-9.69
Total valid votes		8,249	100.00	

Unionist candidate W. S. Loggie's change from 1911 is based on the Conservative Party's results. His personal vote increased by 3.01% over his 1911 result running as a Liberal candidate.
