= Allan A. Davidson =

Canadian politician

Allan A. Davidson, QC was a lawyer and political figure in New Brunswick, Canada. He represented Northumberland County in the Legislative Assembly of New Brunswick from 1874 to 1882 and from 1896 to 1899 as a Conservative member.

He studied law, was called to the bar in 1840 and set up practice in Newcastle, New Brunswick. He ran unsuccessfully for a seat in the provincial assembly in 1870. In 1880, he was named Queen's Counsel. Davidson was a member of the Legislative Council of New Brunswick from 1882 to 1889. He was elected again to the provincial assembly in 1896 after James Robinson was elected to the House of Commons.
