= John Patrick Barry =

Canadian politician and lawyer

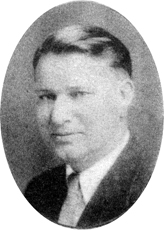

Member of the Canadian Parliament for Northumberland
- In office 1935–1940
- Preceded by: George Manning McDade
- Succeeded by: Joseph Leonard O'Brien

Personal details
- Born: 23 December 1893 Chatham, New Brunswick, Canada
- Died: 17 August 1946 (aged 52)
- Party: Liberal
- Occupation: lawyer

John Patrick Barry (23 December 1893 – 19 August 1946) was a Canadian politician and lawyer. He represented Northumberland County in the Canadian Parliament from 1935 to 1940.

Barry was born in Chatham, New Brunswick, Canada. He was educated at Montreal College, St. Thomas University, and St. Francis Xavier University in Antigonish, where he earned his bachelor of arts degree in 1919. In 1921, he was admitted to the New Brunswick bar and began practicing law.

Defeating candidates Frances Fish and John Adams Creaghan, he was elected to the House of Commons of Canada in the 1935 election as a Member of the Liberal Party to represent the riding of Northumberland. He was defeated in the 1940 election as an Independent Liberal candidate.

He was appointed deputy magistrate of Northumberland County shortly before his death of a heart attack in 1946.

1940 Canadian federal election: Northumberland
Party	Candidate	Votes	%	±%
Conservative	Joseph Leonard O'Brien	5,149	39.91	+16.01
Liberal	John William Maloney	5,072	39.32	-16.67
Independent Liberal	John Patrick Barry	2,679	20.77	-35.52
Total valid votes		12,900	100.00	

1935 Canadian federal election: Northumberland
Party	Candidate	Votes	%	±%
Liberal	John Patrick Barry	7,662	56.29	+15.24
Conservative	John Creaghan	3,253	23.90	-35.05
Reconstruction	Frances Fish	2,697	19.81	Ø
Total valid votes		13,612	100.00	
