= Bud Jardine =

Canadian politician

W.R. (Bud) Jardine

Member of Parliament for Northumberland—Miramichi
- In office 1984–1988
- Preceded by: Maurice Dionne
- Succeeded by: Maurice Dionne

Personal details
- Born: 31 May 1935 (age 90) Chatham, New Brunswick, Canada
- Party: Progressive Conservative
- Profession: naval officer

W.R. (Bud) Jardine (born 31 May 1935) was a Progressive Conservative party member of the House of Commons of Canada. He was a naval officer by career.

Born in Chatham, New Brunswick, Jardine was elected at Northumberland—Miramichi electoral district in the 1984 federal election, thus he served in the 33rd Canadian Parliament. He was defeated in the 1988 federal election by Maurice Dionne of the Liberal party.
