= Charles Hubbard (politician) =

Canadian politician (1940–2020)

The Honourable Charles Hubbard PC CD

Member of Parliament for Miramichi
- In office October 25, 1993 – October 14, 2008
- Preceded by: Maurice Dionne
- Succeeded by: Tilly O'Neill-Gordon

Personal details
- Born: October 29, 1940 Newcastle, New Brunswick, Canada
- Died: February 12, 2020 (aged 79)
- Party: Liberal
- Spouse: Patricia Hubbard
- Profession: High school principal

Charles Isaac Hubbard, PC CD (October 29, 1940 – February 12, 2020) was a Canadian politician. A former member of the House of Commons of Canada, he represented the riding of Miramichi, New Brunswick from 1993 to 2008 as a member of the Liberal Party of Canada. Hubbard was a former school principal. He served as former Parliamentary Secretary to the Minister of Indian Affairs and Northern Development and Parliamentary Secretary to the Minister of Transport during the government of Paul Martin.

== Early life and education ==
Hubbard was born in Newcastle, New Brunswick, the son of late Earl and Abigail (Blackmore) Hubbard. In 1961, he graduated from the Royal Canadian School of Infantry and served briefly with Canadian Guards in Germany and later as a platoon officer, quartermaster, adjutant, company commander and Deputy commander of 2 Royal New Brunswick Regiment (NS). Hubbard obtained a Bachelor of Arts degree majoring in History and Economics, and a Master of Arts in History and a Bachelor of Education degree.

== Teaching career ==
In 1963, he began his career at Harkins High School in Newcastle and also taught at North and South Esk Regional High School in Sunny Corner, New Brunswick. He was the first principal of Miramichi Valley High School. He was also a member of the New Brunswick Teachers Association, the Principals Council, and the National Association of Secondary School Principals.

== Death ==
He died on February 12, 2020.

== Personal life ==
Hubbard lived with his wife Patricia on the family farm in Red Bank, New Brunswick.

== Volunteer work ==
Active in his church and community, he was deeply involved in many community organizations. This included some 17 years as a Director and President of Northumberland Cooperative Dairy Ltd.
