= William Bunting Snowball =

Canadian politician

Member of the Canadian Parliament for Northumberland
- In office 1924 – 1925 (died in office)
- Preceded by: John Morrissy
- Succeeded by: Charles Elijah Fish

Personal details
- Born: January 12, 1865
- Died: September 27, 1925 (aged 60)
- Party: Liberal

William Bunting Snowball (January 12, 1865 – September 27, 1925) was a Canadian politician. He was the eldest son of Jabez Bunting Snowball, a politician who became Lieutenant-Governor of New Brunswick.

Snowball served as the mayor of the Town of Chatham, New Brunswick for four terms. He was elected to the House of Commons of Canada from the riding of Northumberland, New Brunswick as a Liberal in a by-election on October 1, 1924, but served for less than a year before dying suddenly on September 27, 1925.

Snowball was educated at Upper Canada College.

Canadian federal by-election, 7 October 1924
Party	Candidate	Votes	%	±%
On John Morrissy's death, 31 July 1924
Liberal	William Bunting Snowball	6,222	52.71	-3.22
Conservative	Clifford Patrick Hickey	5,583	47.29	+3.22
Total valid votes		11,805	100.00	
