= Charles Joseph Morrissy =

Canadian politician

Member of the Canadian Parliament for Northumberland
- In office 1926–1930
- Preceded by: Charles Elijah Fish
- Succeeded by: George Manning McDade

Personal details
- Born: January 18, 1881 Newcastle, New Brunswick, Canada
- Died: April 22, 1932 (aged 51)
- Party: Liberal
- Occupation: Accountant, insurance agent
- Website: Parliament of Canada biography

Charles Joseph Morrissy (January 18, 1881 – April 22, 1932) was an accountant and political figure in New Brunswick, Canada. He represented Northumberland County in the Legislative Assembly of New Brunswick from 1920 to 1925 and Northumberland in the House of Commons of Canada from 1926 to 1930 as a Liberal member.

He was born in Newcastle, New Brunswick, the son of John Morrissy and Joanna Dunn. Morrissy was educated in Newcastle and at Saint Francis Xavier College in Nova Scotia. In 1908, he married Ellen Catherine Hennessy. He served on the council for Newcastle from 1907 to 1911 and was mayor in 1913, 1914 and 1916.

1926 Canadian federal election: Northumberland
Party	Candidate	Votes	%	±%
Liberal	Charles Joseph Morrissy	6,201	52.16	+10.68
Conservative	Charles Elijah Fish	5,687	47.84	-10.68
Total valid votes		11,888	100.00	
