= List of lieutenant governors of New Brunswick =

The following is a list of the lieutenant governors of New Brunswick. Though the present day office of the lieutenant governor in New Brunswick came into being only upon the province's entry into Canadian Confederation in 1867, the post is a continuation from the first governorship of New Brunswick in 1786. This list also includes a number of the individuals, primarily Chief Justices, who acted briefly as de facto interim lieutenant governors for short periods of time. For instance, when lieutenant governors died in office. These individuals were generally not sworn in as actual lieutenant governors, they merely temporarily assumed the responsibilities of the Lieutenant Governor until a new person was appointed to the position. These "interim" lieutenant governors are identified in the list below as "admin".

== Lieutenant governors of New Brunswick, 1786–1867 ==
| No. | Portrait | Name (Birth–Death) | Term of office | | Monarch Reign | Premier Term of office |
| No. | Portrait | Name (Birth–Death) | Took office | Left office | Monarch Reign | Premier Term of office |
|---|---|---|---|---|---|---|
| 1 | | Thomas Carleton (1735–1817) | 20 May 1786 | 2 February 1817 (Note: Permanently returned to Great Britain in 1803.) | George III (1760–1820) | None |
| – | | Gabriel George Ludlow (1736–1808); Acting | 5 October 1805 | 12 February 1808 | George III (1760–1820) | None |
| – | | Edward Winslow (1746/1747–1815); Acting | 20 February 1808 | 24 May 1808 | George III (1760–1820) | None |
| – | | Sir Martin Hunter; GCH (1757–1846); Acting | 24 May 1808 | 17 December 1808 | George III (1760–1820) | None |
| – | | George Johnstone (died 1825); Acting | 17 December 1808 | 28 April 1809 | George III (1760–1820) | None |
| – | | Sir Martin Hunter (1757–1846); Acting | 28 April 1809 | 10 September 1811 | George III (1760–1820) | None |
| – | | William Balfour (1758–1811); Acting | 10 September 1811 | 14 November 1811 | George III (1760–1820) | None |
| – | | Sir Martin Hunter (1757–1846); Acting | 14 November 1811 | 15 June 1812 | George III (1760–1820) | None |
| – | | George Stracey Smyth (1814–1892) | 15 June 1812 | 17 August 1813 | George III (1760–1820) | None |
| – | | Sir Thomas Saumarez (1760–1845); Acting | 17 August 1813 | 14 August 1814 | George III (1760–1820) | None |
| – | | George Stracey Smyth (1767–1823); Acting | 14 August 1814 | 25 June 1816 | George III (1760–1820) | None |
| – | | Harris W. Hailes (1752–1819); Acting | 25 June 1816 | 30 June 1817 | George III (1760–1820) | None |
| 2 | | George Stracey Smyth (1767–1823) | 1 July 1817 | 27 March 1823 | George III (1760–1820) | None |
| 2 | | George Stracey Smyth (1767–1823) | 1 July 1817 | 27 March 1823 | George IV (1820–1830) | None |
| 3 | | Sir Howard Douglas; 3rd Baronet (1776–1861) | 28 August 1824 | 8 September 1831 | George IV (1820–1830) | None |
| 3 | | Sir Howard Douglas; 3rd Baronet (1776–1861) | 28 August 1824 | 8 September 1831 | William IV (1830–1837) | None |
| 4 | | Sir Archibald Campbell; 1st Baronet (1769–1843) | 9 September 1831 | 1 May 1837 | William IV (1830–1837) | None |
| 5 | | Sir John Harvey (1778–1852) | 1 May 1837 | 26 April 1841 | William IV (1830–1837) | None |
| 5 | | Sir John Harvey (1778–1852) | 1 May 1837 | 26 April 1841 | Victoria (1837–1901) | None |
| 6 | | Sir William Colebrooke (1787–1870) | 27 April 1841 | 11 April 1848 | Victoria (1837–1901) | None |
| 7 | | Sir Edmund Walker Head; 8th Baronet (1805–1868) | 11 April 1848 | 28 September 1854 | Victoria (1837–1901) | None |
| 8 | | John Manners-Sutton (1814–1877) | 7 October 1854 | 26 October 1861 | Victoria (1837–1901) | None |
| 8 | | John Manners-Sutton (1814–1877) | 7 October 1854 | 26 October 1861 | Victoria (1837–1901) | Charles Fisher (1854–1856) |
| 8 | | John Manners-Sutton (1814–1877) | 7 October 1854 | 26 October 1861 | Victoria (1837–1901) | John Hamilton Gray (1856–1857) |
| 8 | | John Manners-Sutton (1814–1877) | 7 October 1854 | 26 October 1861 | Victoria (1837–1901) | Charles Fisher (1857–1861) |
| 8 | | John Manners-Sutton (1814–1877) | 7 October 1854 | 26 October 1861 | Victoria (1837–1901) | Samuel Leonard Tilley (1861–1865) |
| 9 | | Arthur Hamilton-Gordon (1829–1912) | 26 October 1861 | 30 September 1866 | Victoria (1837–1901) | Samuel Leonard Tilley (1861–1865) |
| 9 | | Arthur Hamilton-Gordon (1829–1912) | 26 October 1861 | 30 September 1866 | Victoria (1837–1901) | Albert James Smith (1865–1866) |
| 9 | | Arthur Hamilton-Gordon (1829–1912) | 26 October 1861 | 30 September 1866 | Victoria (1837–1901) | Peter Mitchell (1866–1867) |

== Lieutenant governors of New Brunswick, 1867–present ==
| No. | Portrait | Name (Birth–Death) | Term of office | | Monarch Reign | Premier Term of office |
| No. | Portrait | Name (Birth–Death) | Took office | Left office | Monarch Reign | Premier Term of office |
|---|---|---|---|---|---|---|
| 1 | | Charles Hastings Doyle (1803–1883) | 1 July 1867 | 18 October 1867 | Victoria (1837–1901) | Andrew Rainsford Wetmore (1867–1870) |
| 2 | | Francis Pym Harding (1821–1875) | 18 October 1867 | 23 July 1868 | Victoria (1837–1901) | Andrew Rainsford Wetmore (1867–1870) |
| 3 | | Lemuel Allan Wilmot (1809–1878) | 23 July 1868 | 15 November 1873 | Victoria (1837–1901) | Andrew Rainsford Wetmore (1867–1870) |
| 3 | | Lemuel Allan Wilmot (1809–1878) | 23 July 1868 | 15 November 1873 | Victoria (1837–1901) | George Edwin King (1870–1871) |
| 3 | | Lemuel Allan Wilmot (1809–1878) | 23 July 1868 | 15 November 1873 | Victoria (1837–1901) | George Luther Hathaway (1871–1872) |
| 3 | | Lemuel Allan Wilmot (1809–1878) | 23 July 1868 | 15 November 1873 | Victoria (1837–1901) | George Edwin King (1872–1878) |
| 4 | | Sir Samuel Leonard Tilley (1821–1896) | 15 November 1873 | 16 July 1878 | Victoria (1837–1901) | George Edwin King (1872–1878) |
| 4 | | Sir Samuel Leonard Tilley (1821–1896) | 15 November 1873 | 16 July 1878 | Victoria (1837–1901) | John James Fraser (1878–1882) |
| 5 | | Edward Barron Chandler (1800–1880) | 16 July 1878 | 6 February 1880 | Victoria (1837–1901) | John James Fraser (1878–1882) |
| – | | Sir John Campbell Allen (1817–1898); Administrator of the Government | 6 February 1880 | 11 February 1880 | Victoria (1837–1901) | John James Fraser (1878–1882) |
| 6 | | Robert Duncan Wilmot (1817–1898) | 11 February 1880 | 11 November 1885 | Victoria (1837–1901) | John James Fraser (1878–1882) |
| 6 | | Robert Duncan Wilmot (1817–1898) | 11 February 1880 | 11 November 1885 | Victoria (1837–1901) | Daniel Lionel Hanington (1882–1883) |
| 6 | | Robert Duncan Wilmot (1817–1898) | 11 February 1880 | 11 November 1885 | Victoria (1837–1901) | Andrew George Blair (1883–1896) |
| (4) | | Sir Samuel Leonard Tilley (1821–1896) | 11 November 1885 | 21 September 1893 | Victoria (1837–1901) | Andrew George Blair (1883–1896) |
| 7 | | John Boyd (1826–1893) | 21 September 1893 | 4 December 1893 | Victoria (1837–1901) | Andrew George Blair (1883–1896) |
| – | | Sir John Campbell Allen (1817–1898); Administrator of the Government | 4 December 1893 | 20 December 1893 | Victoria (1837–1901) | Andrew George Blair (1883–1896) |
| 8 | | John James Fraser (1829–1896) | 20 December 1893 | 24 November 1896 | Victoria (1837–1901) | Andrew George Blair (1883–1896) |
| 8 | | John James Fraser (1829–1896) | 20 December 1893 | 24 November 1896 | Victoria (1837–1901) | James Mitchell (1896–1897) |
| – | | William Henry Tuck (1831–1913); Administrator of the Government | 24 November 1896 | 9 December 1896 | Victoria (1837–1901) | James Mitchell (1896–1897) |
| 9 | | Abner Reid McClelan (1831–1917) | 9 December 1896 | 28 January 1902 | Victoria (1837–1901) | James Mitchell (1896–1897) |
| 9 | | Abner Reid McClelan (1831–1917) | 9 December 1896 | 28 January 1902 | Victoria (1837–1901) | Henry Emmerson (1897–1900) |
| 9 | | Abner Reid McClelan (1831–1917) | 9 December 1896 | 28 January 1902 | Victoria (1837–1901) | Lemuel John Tweedie (1900–1907) |
| 9 | | Abner Reid McClelan (1831–1917) | 9 December 1896 | 28 January 1902 | Edward VII (1901–1910) | Lemuel John Tweedie (1900–1907) |
| 10 | | Jabez Bunting Snowball (1837–1907) | 28 January 1902 | 24 February 1907 | Edward VII (1901–1910) | Lemuel John Tweedie (1900–1907) |
| – | | William Henry Tuck (1831–1913); Administrator of the Government | 24 February 1907 | 5 March 1907 | Edward VII (1901–1910) | Lemuel John Tweedie (1900–1907) |
| – | | William Henry Tuck (1831–1913); Administrator of the Government | 24 February 1907 | 5 March 1907 | Edward VII (1901–1910) | William Pugsley (1907) |
| 11 | | Lemuel John Tweedie (1849–1917) | 5 March 1907 | 6 March 1912 | Edward VII (1901–1910) | William Pugsley (1907) |
| 11 | | Lemuel John Tweedie (1849–1917) | 5 March 1907 | 6 March 1912 | Edward VII (1901–1910) | Clifford William Robinson (1907–1908) |
| 11 | | Lemuel John Tweedie (1849–1917) | 5 March 1907 | 6 March 1912 | Edward VII (1901–1910) | John Douglas Hazen (1908–1911) |
| 11 | | Lemuel John Tweedie (1849–1917) | 5 March 1907 | 6 March 1912 | George V (1910–1936) | John Douglas Hazen (1908–1911) |
| 11 | | Lemuel John Tweedie (1849–1917) | 5 March 1907 | 6 March 1912 | George V (1910–1936) | James Kidd Flemming (1911–1914) |
| 12 | | Josiah Wood (1843–1927) | 6 March 1912 | 29 June 1917 | George V (1910–1936) | James Kidd Flemming (1911–1914) |
| 12 | | Josiah Wood (1843–1927) | 6 March 1912 | 29 June 1917 | George V (1910–1936) | George Johnson Clarke (1914–1917) |
| 12 | | Josiah Wood (1843–1927) | 6 March 1912 | 29 June 1917 | George V (1910–1936) | James Alexander Murray (1917) |
| 12 | | Josiah Wood (1843–1927) | 6 March 1912 | 29 June 1917 | George V (1910–1936) | Walter Edward Foster (1917–1923) |
| 13 | | Gilbert Ganong (1851–1917) | 29 March 1917 | 31 October 1917 | George V (1910–1936) | Walter Edward Foster (1917–1923) |
| – | | John Douglas Hazen (1860–1937); Administrator of the Government | 31 October 1917 | 6 November 1917 | George V (1910–1936) | Walter Edward Foster (1917–1923) |
| 14 | | William Pugsley (1850–1925) | 6 November 1917 | 28 February 1923 | George V (1910–1936) | Walter Edward Foster (1917–1923) |
| 15 | | William Frederick Todd (1854–1935) | 28 February 1923 | 28 December 1928 | George V (1910–1936) | Peter Veniot (1923–1925) |
| 15 | | William Frederick Todd (1854–1935) | 28 February 1923 | 28 December 1928 | George V (1910–1936) | John Babington Macaulay Baxter (1925–1931) |
| 16 | | Hugh Havelock McLean (1854–1938) | 28 December 1928 | 8 February 1935 | George V (1910–1936) | John Babington Macaulay Baxter (1925–1931) |
| 16 | | Hugh Havelock McLean (1854–1938) | 28 December 1928 | 8 February 1935 | George V (1910–1936) | Charles Dow Richards (1931–1933) |
| 16 | | Hugh Havelock McLean (1854–1938) | 28 December 1928 | 8 February 1935 | George V (1910–1936) | Leonard Percy de Wolfe Tilley (1933–1935) |
| 17 | | Murray MacLaren (1861–1942) | 8 February 1935 | 5 March 1940 | George V (1910–1936) | Leonard Percy de Wolfe Tilley (1933–1935) |
| 17 | | Murray MacLaren (1861–1942) | 8 February 1935 | 5 March 1940 | George V (1910–1936) | Allison Dysart (1935–1940) |
| 17 | | Murray MacLaren (1861–1942) | 8 February 1935 | 5 March 1940 | Edward VIII (1936) | Allison Dysart (1935–1940) |
| 17 | | Murray MacLaren (1861–1942) | 8 February 1935 | 5 March 1940 | George VI (1936–1952) | Allison Dysart (1935–1940) |
| 18 | | William George Clark (1865–1948) | 5 March 1940 | 1 November 1945 | George VI (1936–1952) | Allison Dysart (1935–1940) |
| 18 | | William George Clark (1865–1948) | 5 March 1940 | 1 November 1945 | George VI (1936–1952) | John B. McNair (1940–1952) |
| 19 | | David Laurence MacLaren (1893–1960) | 1 November 1945 | 5 June 1958 | George VI (1936–1952) | John B. McNair (1940–1952) |
| 19 | | David Laurence MacLaren (1893–1960) | 1 November 1945 | 5 June 1958 | Elizabeth II (1952–2022) | John B. McNair (1940–1952) |
| 19 | | David Laurence MacLaren (1893–1960) | 1 November 1945 | 5 June 1958 | Elizabeth II (1952–2022) | Hugh John Flemming (1952–1960) |
| 20 | | Joseph Leonard O'Brien (1895–1973) | 5 June 1958 | 9 June 1965 | Elizabeth II (1952–2022) | Hugh John Flemming (1952–1960) |
| 20 | | Joseph Leonard O'Brien (1895–1973) | 5 June 1958 | 9 June 1965 | Elizabeth II (1952–2022) | Louis Robichaud (1960–1970) |
| 21 | | John B. McNair (1889–1968) | 9 June 1965 | 1 February 1968 | Elizabeth II (1952–2022) | Louis Robichaud (1960–1970) |
| 22 | | Wallace Samuel Bird (1917–1971) | 1 February 1968 | 2 October 1971 | Elizabeth II (1952–2022) | Louis Robichaud (1960–1970) |
| 22 | | Wallace Samuel Bird (1917–1971) | 1 February 1968 | 2 October 1971 | Elizabeth II (1952–2022) | Richard Hatfield (1970–1987) |
| – | | George F. G. Bridges (Note: George Frederick Gregory Bridges – Chief Justice of New Brunswick (1964–1972)); Administrator of the Government | 2 October 1971 | 8 October 1971 | Elizabeth II (1952–2022) | Richard Hatfield (1970–1987) |
| 23 | | Hédard Robichaud (1911–1999) | 8 October 1971 | 12 November 1981 | Elizabeth II (1952–2022) | Richard Hatfield (1970–1987) |
| – | | Charles J. A. Hughes (Note: Charles J. A. Hughes – Chief Justice of New Brunswick (1972–1984)); Administrator of the Government | 12 November 1981 | 23 December 1981 | Elizabeth II (1952–2022) | Richard Hatfield (1970–1987) |
| 24 | | George Stanley (1907–2002) | 23 December 1981 | 20 August 1987 | Elizabeth II (1952–2022) | Richard Hatfield (1970–1987) |
| 25 | | Gilbert Finn (1920–2015) | 20 August 1987 | 21 June 1994 | Elizabeth II (1952–2022) | Richard Hatfield (1970–1987) |
| 25 | | Gilbert Finn (1920–2015) | 20 August 1987 | 21 June 1994 | Elizabeth II (1952–2022) | Frank McKenna (1987–1997) |
| 26 | | Margaret McCain (born 1934) | 21 June 1994 | 18 April 1997 | Elizabeth II (1952–2022) | Frank McKenna (1987–1997) |
| 27 | | Marilyn Trenholme Counsell (1933–2026) | 18 April 1997 | 26 August 2003 | Elizabeth II (1952–2022) | Frank McKenna (1987–1997) |
| 27 | | Marilyn Trenholme Counsell (1933–2026) | 18 April 1997 | 26 August 2003 | Elizabeth II (1952–2022) | Ray Frenette (1997–1998) |
| 27 | | Marilyn Trenholme Counsell (1933–2026) | 18 April 1997 | 26 August 2003 | Elizabeth II (1952–2022) | Camille Thériault (1998–1999) |
| 27 | | Marilyn Trenholme Counsell (1933–2026) | 18 April 1997 | 26 August 2003 | Elizabeth II (1952–2022) | Bernard Lord (1999–2006) |
| 28 | | Herménégilde Chiasson (born 1946) | 26 August 2003 | 30 September 2009 | Elizabeth II (1952–2022) | Bernard Lord (1999–2006) |
| 28 | | Herménégilde Chiasson (born 1946) | 26 August 2003 | 30 September 2009 | Elizabeth II (1952–2022) | Shawn Graham (2006–2010) |
| 29 | | Graydon Nicholas (born 1946) | 30 September 2009 | 23 October 2014 | Elizabeth II (1952–2022) | Shawn Graham (2006–2010) |
| 29 | | Graydon Nicholas (born 1946) | 30 September 2009 | 23 October 2014 | Elizabeth II (1952–2022) | David Alward (2010–2014) |
| 29 | | Graydon Nicholas (born 1946) | 30 September 2009 | 23 October 2014 | Elizabeth II (1952–2022) | Brian Gallant (2014–2018) |
| 30 | | Jocelyne Roy-Vienneau (1956–2019) | 23 October 2014 | 2 August 2019 | Elizabeth II (1952–2022) | Brian Gallant (2014–2018) |
| 30 | | Jocelyne Roy-Vienneau (1956–2019) | 23 October 2014 | 2 August 2019 | Elizabeth II (1952–2022) | Blaine Higgs (2018–2024) |
| – | | J.C. Marc Richard (Note: J.C. Marc Richard – Chief Justice of New Brunswick (2018–present)); Administrator of the Government | 2 August 2019 | 8 September 2019 | Elizabeth II (1952–2022) | Blaine Higgs (2018–2024) |
| 31 | | Brenda Murphy (born 1958/1959) | 8 September 2019 | 22 January 2025 | Elizabeth II (1952–2022) | Blaine Higgs (2018–2024) |
| 31 | | Brenda Murphy (born 1958/1959) | 8 September 2019 | 22 January 2025 | Charles III (since 2022) | Blaine Higgs (2018–2024) |
| 31 | | Brenda Murphy (born 1958/1959) | 8 September 2019 | 22 January 2025 | Charles III (since 2022) | Susan Holt (since 2024) |
| 32 | | Louise Imbeault | 22 January 2025 | | Charles III (since 2022) | Susan Holt (since 2024) |

== See also ==
- Office-holders of Canada
- Canadian incumbents by year
