= Percy Smith (Canadian politician) =

Canadian politician

G.A. Percy Smith

Member of Parliament for Northumberland—Miramichi
- In office June 1968 – May 1974
- Preceded by: George Roy McWilliam
- Succeeded by: Maurice Dionne

Personal details
- Born: 22 December 1921 Lower Newcastle, New Brunswick, Canada
- Died: 23 January 2009 (aged 87) Miramichi, New Brunswick, Canada
- Party: Liberal
- Spouse: M. Elizabeth Cullinan
- Profession: barrister, lawyer

Gerald Albert Percy Smith, QC (22 December 1921 – 23 January 2009) was a Liberal party member of the House of Commons of Canada. He was a barrister and lawyer by career.

Smith was born at a farm in Lower Newcastle, New Brunswick. Following graduation, he enlisted in the Canadian army and was stationed in England with the North Nova Scotia Highlanders. Lieutenant Smith headed a platoon which landed in Normandy on D-Day. His platoon pushed inland, where Percy and other members were taken prisoners of war. He later escaped, but was recaptured and imprisoned in Germany in August 1944. The POW camp was liberated by the American troops in May 1945. Percy left the army with the rank of captain. After returning home from the war, Percy worked in a mine in NWT, and then attended Law School at the University of New Brunswick and graduated from there in 1950.

He was first elected to Parliament at the Northumberland—Miramichi riding in the 1968 general election, then re-elected there in the 1972 election. He was appointed a Queen's Counsel in 1972. In May 1974, Smith finished his term in the 29th Canadian Parliament and did not seek re-election.

Smith also served as Mayor of Newcastle, New Brunswick.

During the last three years of his life, Smith lived at a senior citizens residence in Miramichi, New Brunswick where he died on 23 January 2009.
