= William Muirhead (politician) =

Canadian politician

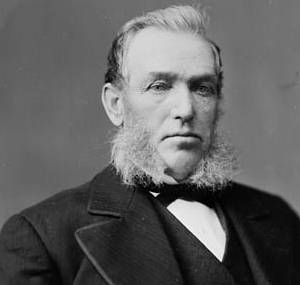
William Muirhead Source: Library and Archives Canada

William Muirhead (April 4, 1819 – December 29, 1884) was a businessman and political figure in New Brunswick, Canada. He served on the Legislative Council of New Brunswick from 1867 to 1873.

In 1873, Muirhead was named to the Senate of Canada for Chatham division as a Liberal and served until his death in 1884.

== Biography ==
William Muirhead was born in Pictou, Nova Scotia, the son of John Muirhead, a Scottish immigrant. He was educated at Miramichi, New Brunswick. He settled in Chatham and married Annie Gray.

== Business career ==
Muirhead was involved in shipping goods and owned his own ships and mills. He was president of the Miramichi Shipbuilding Company and the Miramichi Warehousing and Dock Company. He was also director of the Maritime Bank of the Dominion and of the Northern Western Railway.
