= John William Maloney =

Canadian politician

Member of Parliament for Northumberland
- In office 1945–1949
- Preceded by: Joseph Leonard O'Brien
- Succeeded by: George Roy McWilliam

Personal details
- Born: August 22, 1883 Nelson, New Brunswick
- Died: June 3, 1954
- Party: Liberal
- Profession: Lumber merchant

John William Maloney (22 August 1883 – 3 June 1954) was a Liberal Member of Parliament (MP) in the House of Commons of Canada for the constituency of Northumberland, from 1945 to 1949.

Born in Nelson, New Brunswick, Maloney was a lumber merchant.

1945 Canadian federal election: Northumberland
Party	Candidate	Votes	%	±%
Liberal	John William Maloney	8,507	62.29	+22.97
Progressive Conservative	Joseph Leonard O'Brien	5,149	37.71	-2.20
Total valid votes		13,656	100.00	
