= Martin Cranney =

Canadian politician

Martin Cranney (1795–1889) was an Irish-born New Brunswick politician. He was a resident of Chatham, New Brunswick and represented Northumberland County in the 14th New Brunswick Legislative Assembly from 1846 to 1850.

Cranney came to New Brunswick in 1815 and settled in Chatham. He married a local girl, Ann Waddleton. He was, among other things, a magistrate and a shipping agent.

Cranney is significant as he was one of the first Roman Catholics elected to the Assembly and it was during the sitting of this 14th New Brunswick Legislative Assembly that responsible government came to New Brunswick. He held a number of public offices in the Chatham area and was one of the most prominent Catholic laymen of his time in the Miramichi Valley.

Cranney is buried in the cemetery of St. Michael's Basilica in Miramichi, New Brunswick, in what was formerly Chatham.

Cranney was married twice and had a large family. Several of his children migrated to the State of Washington to enter the lumber business.
