= Jabez Bunting Snowball =

Canadian politician

The Honourable Jabez Bunting Snowball
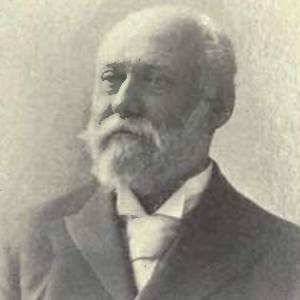

11th Lieutenant-Governor of New Brunswick
- In office January 21, 1902 – February 24, 1907
- Monarch: Edward VII
- Governors General: The Earl of Minto; The Earl Grey
- Premier: Lemuel J. Tweedie
- Preceded by: Abner Reid McClelan
- Succeeded by: Lemuel John Tweedie

Senator from New Brunswick
- In office 1891–1902

Member of the Canadian Parliament for Northumberland
- In office 1878–1882
- Preceded by: Peter Mitchell
- Succeeded by: Peter Mitchell

Personal details
- Born: September 24, 1837 Lunenburg, Nova Scotia
- Died: February 24, 1907 (aged 69) Fredericton, New Brunswick
- Party: Liberal
- Spouses: Margaret MacDougall (m. 1858; died 1871) Margaret Ellen Archibald (m. 1873)
- Children: William Bunting Snowball
- Occupation: Exporter, lumber merchant, shipowner

Jabez Bunting Snowball (24 September 1837 – 24 February 1907) was a businessman, the 11th Lieutenant Governor of New Brunswick, Canada, and politician from the Town of Chatham, New Brunswick. He operated a number of businesses in the eastern part of the province and was one of its most prominent citizens.

== Early life ==
Snowball came to the Miramichi Valley from Lunenburg, Nova Scotia when his father, a Methodist Minister, answered a call to St. Luke's Church in Chatham.

Snowball attended Wesleyan Academy in Sackville, New Brunswick, and was dissuaded by his family from going to California to seek his fortune.

== Entrepreneur ==
Snowball started his working life as a clerk in a dry goods store in Chatham, owned by John MacDougall whose daughter Margaret he married. When MacDougall died in 1866, Snowball, at the age of 27, took over the business and expanded it.

In 1871, he was a founder of the Miramichi Steam Navigation Company which soon built and operated six small steamers on the river. On his own account he purchased and operated several others. The next year he built the largest steam sawmill in the Province, milling some 17,000 board feet (40 m^{3}) of lumber per day. He soon opened sawmills in Tracadie, Bay du Vin and Red Bank, operating a grist mill in the last community as well.

Fish attracted his attention as well, and soon Snowball had canneries on Shippegan Island and Miscou Island. In 1879, he sent 200,000 lb. of lobster to the United Kingdom.

Snowball maintained high productivity standards for himself and his staff. He included a policy of opposing labor unionization within the company.

== Magnate ==
By the 1880s, Snowball was the second largest exporter of lumber in New Brunswick, and employed 1,000 men in his various enterprises.

In 1886, Snowball constructed the Chatham Branch Railway connecting the town with the Intercolonial Railway some six miles away. Along with Alexander Gibson, Snowball constructed an extension of the railway to Gibson, N.B., some 95 miles away. In 1893, he sold his interest to Gibson.

In 1887, he was a founding member of the Chatham Telephone Exchange which was later expanded into nearby Kent, Gloucester and Restigouche counties. This enterprise was sold in 1905 to the Central Telephone Company. Next was the Chatham Electric Light Company, founded in 1888.

== Political life ==
He represented his area in the House of Commons of Canada as a member of the Liberal Party of Canada from 1878 to 1882. After a period in the Senate of Canada, he served from 1902 – 1907 as Lieutenant Governor of New Brunswick.

Snowball was active in securing incorporation for the town of Chatham, and when he ran to be its first mayor in 1896, he was defeated by a local doctor by two votes.

== Local grandee ==
Snowball and his wife (called "Lady Snowball" by the locals) maintained a splendid town residence called "Wellington Villa" at the town's most important intersection, and lived in great style, often entertaining with many servants and fine furniture.

== Legacy ==
Snowball died in 1907 at the age of 69, a wealthy and influential man. But, changing fortunes and a lack of the same great entrepreneurial flair in the next generation prevented a dynasty being established. His businesses were divided among his children and gradually frittered away.

Snowball's mill in Chatham was caught up in the postwar depression of 1919 and closed.

== Electoral record ==
1878 Canadian federal election: Northumberland
Party	Candidate	Votes	%	±%
Liberal	Jabez Bunting Snowball	1,585	53.38	+14.92
Independent	Peter Mitchell	1,384	46.62	-14.92
Total valid votes		2,969	100.00	

1874 Canadian federal election: Northumberland
Party	Candidate	Votes	%	±%
Independent	Peter Mitchell	1,312	61.54	n/a
Unknown	Jabez Bunting Snowball	820	38.46	Ø
Total valid votes		2,132	100.00	
Source: lop.parl.ca
