= Joseph Leonard O'Brien =

Canadian politician

The Honourable Joseph Leonard O'Brien

21st Lieutenant Governor of New Brunswick
- In office June 5, 1958 – June 9, 1965
- Monarch: Elizabeth II
- Governors General: Vincent Massey; Georges Vanier
- Premier: Hugh John Flemming; Louis Robichaud
- Preceded by: David Laurence MacLaren
- Succeeded by: John B. McNair

Member of the Canadian Parliament for Northumberland
- In office 1940–1945
- Preceded by: John Patrick Barry
- Succeeded by: John William Maloney

Member of the Legislative Assembly of New Brunswick for Northumberland
- In office 1925–1930

Speaker of the Legislative Assembly of New Brunswick
- In office 1926–1930
- Preceded by: Allison Dysart
- Succeeded by: Frederick C. Squires

Personal details
- Born: November 6, 1895 South Nelson, New Brunswick, Canada
- Died: June 18, 1973 (aged 77)
- Party: National Government
- Spouse: Kathleen O'Leary

Joseph Leonard O'Brien (November 6, 1895 – June 18, 1973) was a Canadian politician and businessman. Born in South Nelson, New Brunswick, he was a member of the Legislative Assembly of New Brunswick from 1925 to 1930 and was Speaker of the Assembly. By profession he was a lumber merchant, operating a small sawmill in South Nelson.

In 1940, he was elected to the House of Commons of Canada for the riding of Northumberland. A member of the National Government, he was defeated in 1945. In 1958, he was appointed the 21st Lieutenant Governor of New Brunswick and served until 1965.

He purchased Beaubears Island, New Brunswick in 1920 for the sum of $1.00. A monument stands in the national park on the island in his honour.

His remains rest at Malcolm Cemetery of St. Patrick's Church in Nelson-Miramichi, Miramichi, New Brunswick, Canada.

1945 Canadian federal election: Northumberland
Party	Candidate	Votes	%	±%
Liberal	John William Maloney	8,507	53.4	+14.08
Progressive Conservative	Joseph Leonard O'Brien	7,425	46.6	+6.69
Total valid votes		15,932	100.00	

1940 Canadian federal election: Northumberland
Party	Candidate	Votes	%	±%
National Government	Joseph Leonard O'Brien	5,149	39.91	+16.01
Liberal	John William Maloney	5,072	39.32	-16.67
Independent Liberal	John Patrick Barry	2,679	20.77	-35.52
Total valid votes		12,900	100.00	
