= Peter Mitchell (politician) =

Canadian Father of Confederation (1824–1899)

The Honourable Peter Mitchell PC
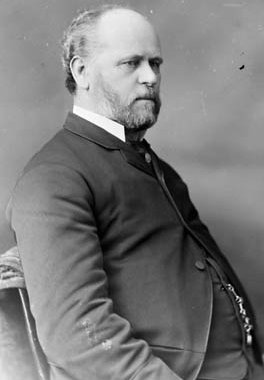

6th Premier of the Colony of New Brunswick
- In office 1866–1867
- Preceded by: Albert James Smith
- Succeeded by: Andrew Rainsford Wetmore (Premier of the Province of New Brunswick)

Senator for New Brunswick
- In office October 23, 1867 – July 13, 1872
- Appointed by: Royal Proclamation

Member of the Canadian Parliament for Northumberland
- In office 1872–1878
- Succeeded by: Jabez Bunting Snowball
- In office 1882–1891
- Preceded by: Jabez Bunting Snowball
- Succeeded by: Michael Adams

Personal details
- Born: January 24, 1824 Newcastle, New Brunswick, Canada
- Died: October 25, 1899 (aged 75) Montreal, Quebec, Canada
- Spouse(s): Isabella Gough, née Carvell (m. 1853)
- Children: 1 daughter (d. 24 October 1899)
- Cabinet: Minister of Marine and Fisheries (1867–1873)

Peter Mitchell PC (January 4, 1824 – October 25, 1899) was a Canadian lawyer, shipbuilder, and politician from New Brunswick, and a Father of Confederation. He was the sixth and last Premier of the Colony of New Brunswick before Canadian Confederation in 1867. After confederation, Mitchell represented New Brunswick in the Senate of Canada as a Liberal until his resignation in 1872 to serve as a member of the Parliament of Canada representing Northumberland as an independent; he described himself as an "Independent Liberal" during this time.

== Early life and education ==
Peter Mitchell was born on January 4, 1824, in Newcastle (present-day Miramichi), New Brunswick, to Scottish-born immigrant parents. His father was also named Peter Mitchell, and his mother's name was Barbara Grant. He was educated at a local grammar school and afterwards spent four years working for George Kerr's law office. He became an attorney on October 14, 1847.

== Career ==
Mitchell joined a legal partnership with John Mercer Johnson in October 1847, with both practicing law in their respective locations. On October 7, 1849, Mitchell was called to the bar of New Brunswick. Mitchell's partnership with Johnson later ended in 1852, as Mitchell sought to pursue himself in the lumbering and shipbuilding business, later entering a shipbuilding partnership with John Haws, a relative of his wife, the following year. The two built a minimum of 12 vessels throughout their partnership, which lasted until 1861.

Mitchell ran again in 1856 as an opponent of Prohibition, which had been proposed by the government. He carried a pistol for protection during the campaign and rum for his supporters. He was successful in this election. In the legislature, Mitchell opposed denominational schools and supported the creation of municipal government. He became a member of the Executive Council in 1859, and introduced the colony's first bankruptcy act in order to make things easier for debtors. Mitchell did not run for re-election in 1861, but was soon appointed to the Legislative Council of New Brunswick (the colony's upper house) and rejoined the Executive Council.

While attending the Quebec Conference of 1864, Peter Mitchell was a strong supporter of Canadian Confederation. He resigned from the Executive Council in 1865 when the pro-Confederation government of Samuel Leonard Tilley was defeated, and helped lieutenant-governor Arthur Hamilton Gordon force the resignation of the anti-Confederation government of Albert James Smith in 1866. Gordon appointed Mitchell as the new premier. Mitchell asked Gordon to call an election, and he and his Confederation Party were returned with a majority that approved the participation of the colony in the Canadian Confederation in 1867.

Mitchell attended the London Conference, which drafted the British North America Act. He was appointed to the new Senate of Canada for its inaugural session in July 1867. Mitchell became a member of Sir John A. Macdonald's first cabinet as minister of marine and fisheries. He was an aggressive defender of Canadian interests, and contested foreign fishing in Canadian waters to the extent of using gunboats to seize American vessels.

Mitchell resigned from the Senate in 1872 to run for a seat in the House of Commons of Canada where he felt he would have more influence. He was acclaimed in a by-election, but in 1873 the Macdonald government fell due to the Pacific Scandal. Mitchell abandoned the Liberal-Conservative Party of Macdonald and declared himself an independent Member of Parliament (MP). He had little influence as an independent and was distrusted by both Conservatives and Liberals.

Mitchell resigned his seat in 1878 after being accused of violating the Independence of Parliament Act by leasing a building to the government while he was a senator. He re-offered in the subsequent by-election and was returned to parliament.

He ran in the 1878 federal election as an "Independent Liberal" who supported Macdonald's National Policy. Mitchell was defeated by independent candidate Jabez Bunting Snowball.

Mitchell returned to the Commons in the 1882 election and was re-elected in the 1887 election as an independent Liberal, but was defeated in the 1891 election.

In 1885, Mitchell purchased the Montreal Herald and Daily Commercial Gazette, and used it to attack the policies of both Liberals and Conservatives. He also called for mercy for Louis Riel, and blamed Macdonald for causing the Riel Rebellion by not dealing with Métis complaints. He became a supporter of Sir Wilfrid Laurier and ran as a Liberal in the 1896 election but lost. Laurier made him general inspector of fisheries for Quebec and the Maritime provinces, and Mitchell held that position until his death in 1899.

In July 1899, as he was leaving the parliamentary buildings, Ottawa, he was stricken by paralysis. He seemed to recover, but on 25 October 1899, he was found dead in his rooms in the Windsor Hotel, Montreal.

== Family ==
In 1853, he married Barbara Grant, a widow from St. John, New Brunswick. They had one daughter together before Isabella died in 1889. His nephew was Charles R. Mitchell a former provincial Cabinet Minister and leader of the Alberta Liberal Party.

== Electoral record ==
1896 Canadian federal election: Northumberland
| Party | Candidate | Votes | % | ±% |
|---|---|---|---|---|
| Conservative | James Robinson | 2,225 | 48.34 | -7.71 |
| Liberal | Peter Mitchell | 1,718 | 37.32 | -6.63 |
| Independent | John Morrissy | 660 | 14.34 | Ø |
| Total valid votes | | 4,603 | 100.00 | |

1891 Canadian federal election: Northumberland
| Party | Candidate | Votes | % | ±% |
|---|---|---|---|---|
| Conservative | Michael Adams | 2,192 | 56.05 | +15.88 |
| Independent Liberal | Peter Mitchell | 1,719 | 43.95 | -15.88 |
| Total valid votes | | 3,911 | 100.00 | |

1887 Canadian federal election: Northumberland
| Party | Candidate | Votes | % | ±% |
|---|---|---|---|---|
| Independent Liberal | Peter Mitchell | 2,271 | 59.83 | n/a |
| Conservative | Michael Adams | 1,525 | 40.17 | Ø |
| Total valid votes | | 3796 | 100.00 | |

1882 Canadian federal election: Northumberland
| Party | Candidate | Votes | % | ±% |
|---|---|---|---|---|
| Independent | Peter Mitchell | acclaimed | n/a | n/a |

Canadian federal by-election, 5 February 1878
| Party | Candidate | Votes | % | ±% |
|---|---|---|---|---|
Mitchell resigned his seat and re-offered after being accused of violating the Independence of Parliament Act by leasing a building to the government while he was a senator.

1878 Canadian federal election: Northumberland
| Party | Candidate | Votes | % | ±% |
|---|---|---|---|---|
| Liberal | Jabez Bunting Snowball | 1,585 | 53.38 | +14.92 |
| Independent | Peter Mitchell | 1,384 | 46.62 | -14.92 |
| Total valid votes | | 2,969 | 100.00 | |

1874 Canadian federal election: Northumberland
| Party | Candidate | Votes | % | ±% |
|---|---|---|---|---|
| Independent | Peter Mitchell | 1,312 | 61.54 | n/a |
| Unknown | Jabez Bunting Snowball | 820 | 38.46 | Ø |
| Total valid votes | | 2,132 | 100.00 | |
Source: lop.parl.ca

1872 Canadian federal election: Northumberland
| Party | Candidate | Votes | % | ±% |
|---|---|---|---|---|
| Independent | Peter Mitchell | acclaimed | n/a | n/a |
Source: Canadian Elections Database
