= George Manning McDade =

Canadian politician (1893–1966)

Member of the Canadian Parliament for Northumberland
- In office 1930–1935
- Preceded by: Charles Joseph Morrissy
- Succeeded by: John Patrick Barry

Personal details
- Born: January 7, 1893 Saint John, New Brunswick, Canada
- Died: May 25, 1966 (aged 73)
- Party: Conservative
- Occupation: Barrister, journalist

George Manning McDade (January 7, 1893 in Saint John, New Brunswick, Canada – May 25, 1966) was a Canadian politician, lawyer, and journalist. Defeating Liberal candidate George Percival Burchill, he was elected to the House of Commons of Canada in the 1930 election as a Member of the Conservative Party to represent the riding of Northumberland.

1930 Canadian federal election: Northumberland
Party	Candidate	Votes	%	±%
Conservative	George Manning McDade	8,095	58.95	+11.11
Liberal	George Burchill	5,637	41.05	-11.11
Total valid votes		13,732	100.00	
Source: lop.parl.ca
