= Miramichi—Grand Lake =

Federal electoral district in New Brunswick, Canada

New Brunswick electoral district
- Interactive map of riding boundaries from the 2025 federal election

Federal electoral district
- Legislature: House of Commons
MP
Michael Dawson
Conservative
- District created: 1867
- First contested: 1867
- Last contested: 2025
- District webpage: profile, map

Demographics
- Population (2016): 57,405
- Electors (2025): 51,673
- Area (km²): 17,420
- Pop. density (per km²): 3.3
- Census division(s): Kent, Northumberland, Queens, Sunbury, York
- Census subdivision(s): Miramichi, Miramichi River Valley, Grand Lake, Arcadia (part), Alnwick, Five Rivers (part), Nouvelle-Arcadie, Upper Miramichi, Richibucto, Neguac

Miramichi—Grand Lake is a federal electoral district in New Brunswick that has been represented in the House of Commons of Canada since 1867 under various names.

== History ==
The riding started out as Northumberland (later known as Northumberland-Miramichi), and was replaced by Miramichi from 1988 to 2015, and then Miramichi—Grand Lake since 2015.

The Miramichi riding consisted of the entirety of Northumberland County and the area around Kouchibouguac National Park, adding in 2003 the Belledune area of Restigouche County and Gloucester County as well several bedroom communities for Bathurst. The bedroom communities of Bathurst were returned to the Acadie-Bathurst riding after the 2006 election.

The Miramichi riding was subsequently succeeded by the current Miramichi-Grand Lake riding, which lost the Belledune region and gained a portion of the Grand Lake region.

=== Northumberland/Northumberland—Miramichi ===
The riding was created in 1867 as "Northumberland" riding, but in 1914 the same name was given to a riding in Ontario. In 1955 this inconvenience was relieved by renaming the New Brunswick riding to "Northumberland—Miramichi". Until 1966, Northumberland—Miramichi consisted solely of Northumberland County, but due to declining populations, parts of northern Kent County, near present-day Kouchibouguac National Park, were added. In 1987, Northumberland—Miramichi was abolished when it was redistributed into Miramichi and Beauséjour ridings.

=== Miramichi ===
Miramichi riding was created in 1987 primarily from Northumberland—Miramichi riding, and incorporating parts of Acadie—Bathurst, Madawaska—Restigouche and York—Sunbury ridings.

Between 1987 and 1996, Miramichi also included a small part of York County, and in 2003, a large area to the north, including Allardville and Belledune, was added to the riding.

In 2004, there were legal problems regarding the 2003 boundaries. The following is from the Elections Canada website:

In May 2004, the Federal Court of Canada made its decision in Raîche v. Canada (Attorney General), concerning a portion of the electoral boundary between the ridings of Miramichi and Acadie—Bathurst. The Court held that in transferring certain parts of parishes from the riding of Acadie–Bathurst to Miramichi, the Federal Electoral Boundaries Commission for New Brunswick erred in its application of the rules governing the preparation of its recommendations. The new boundaries commission was created under Part I of the Inquiries Act in response to this court decision.

The boundaries reverted to the ones used in the 1996 representation after the 2006 election.

=== Miramichi-Grand Lake ===
Miramichi—Grand Lake was created by the 2012 federal electoral boundaries redistribution and was legally defined in the 2013 representation order. It came into effect upon the call of the 2015 Canadian federal election. 83% of the riding came from the previous Miramichi district, and incorporated small portions of Fredericton (10%), Beauséjour (6%), and Tobique—Mactaquac (1%). The riding, gained a portion of the Grand Lake region. Unlike adjoining regions which had been added to the riding in previous redistributions, Grand Lake's name was added to the name of the riding in this redistribution.

Following the 2022 Canadian federal electoral redistribution, its boundary with Madawaska—Restigouche was rerouted around Mount Carleton Provincial Park and the Nepisiguit Protected Natural Area, lost the remainder of the Regional Municipality of Tracadie to Acadie—Bathurst, gained the remainder of the Parishes of Maugerville, Sheffield and Canning from Fredericton, and gained Waterborough from Fundy Royal.

== Members of Parliament ==
Parliament	Years	Member	Party
Northumberland
1st	1867–1868	John Mercer Johnson	Liberal
1st	1868–1872	Richard Hutchison	Liberal
2nd	1872–1874	Peter Mitchell	Independent
3rd	1874–1878	Peter Mitchell	Independent
4th	1878–1882	Jabez Bunting Snowball	Liberal
5th	1882–1887	Peter Mitchell	Independent
6th	1887–1891	Peter Mitchell	Independent
7th	1891–1896	Michael Adams	Conservative
8th	1896–1900	James Robinson	Conservative
9th	1900–1904	James Robinson	Conservative
10th	1904–1908	W. S. Loggie	Liberal
11th	1908–1911	W. S. Loggie	Liberal
12th	1911–1917	W. S. Loggie	Liberal
13th	1917–1921	W. S. Loggie	Government (Unionist)
14th	1921–1924	John Morrissy	Liberal
14th	1924–1925	William Bunting Snowball	Liberal
15th	1925–1926	Charles Elijah Fish	Conservative
16th	1926–1930	Charles Joseph Morrissy	Liberal
17th	1930–1935	George Manning McDade	Conservative
18th	1935–1940	John Patrick Barry	Liberal
19th	1940–1945	Joseph Leonard O'Brien	Conservative
20th	1945–1949	John William Maloney	Liberal
21st	1949–1953	George Roy McWilliam	Liberal
22nd	1953–1957	George Roy McWilliam	Liberal
Northumberland—Miramichi
23rd	1957–1958	George Roy McWilliam	Liberal
24th	1958–1962	George Roy McWilliam	Liberal
25th	1962–1963	George Roy McWilliam	Liberal
26th	1963–1965	George Roy McWilliam	Liberal
27th	1965–1968	George Roy McWilliam	Liberal
28th	1968–1972	Percy Smith	Liberal
29th	1972–1974	Percy Smith	Liberal
30th	1974–1979	Maurice Dionne	Liberal
31st	1979–1980	Maurice Dionne	Liberal
32nd	1980–1984	Maurice Dionne	Liberal
33rd	1984–1988	Bud Jardine	Progressive Conservative
Miramichi
34th	1988–1993	Maurice Dionne	Liberal
35th	1993–1997	Charles Hubbard	Liberal
36th	1997–2000	Charles Hubbard	Liberal
37th	2000–2004	Charles Hubbard	Liberal
38th	2004–2006	Charles Hubbard	Liberal
39th	2006–2008	Charles Hubbard	Liberal
40th	2008–2011	Tilly O'Neill-Gordon	Conservative
41st	2011–2015	Tilly O'Neill-Gordon	Conservative
Miramichi—Grand Lake
42nd	2015–2019	Pat Finnigan	Liberal
43rd	2019–2021	Pat Finnigan	Liberal
44th	2021–2025	Jake Stewart	Conservative
45th	2025–present	Michael Dawson	Conservative

== Election results ==
Graph of election results in Northumberland, Northumberland—Miramichi, Miramichi, Miramichi—Grand Lake (1867-, parties that never received 2% of the vote are omitted)

=== Miramichi—Grand Lake, 2013 – present ===
Graph of election results in Miramichi—Grand Lake (2013-, parties that never received 2% of the vote are omitted)

2025 Canadian federal election
Party	Candidate	Votes	%	±%	Expenditures
Conservative	Mike Dawson	18,421	48.15	+2.69	
Liberal	Lisa Harris	18,037	47.15	+10.15	
New Democratic	Josh Floyd	968	2.53	-4.86	
Green	Matthew Ian Clark	831	2.17	-2.52	
Total valid votes/expense limit		38,257	99.22	+0.11	
Total rejected ballots		302	0.78	-0.12	
Turnout		38,559	74.30	+7.0	
Eligible voters		51,896			
Conservative hold		Swing		-3.73	
Source: Elections Canada
Note: number of eligible voters does not include voting day registrations.

2021 federal election redistributed results
Party	Vote	%
Conservative	15,345	45.46
Liberal	12,490	37.00
New Democratic	2,494	7.39
People's	1,815	5.38
Green	1,582	4.69
Independent	15	0.04
Libertarian	11	0.03
Communist	3	0.01
Total valid votes	33,755	99.10
Rejected ballots	308	0.90
Registered voters/ estimated turnout	50,587	67.34

2021 Canadian federal election
Party	Candidate	Votes	%	±%	Expenditures
Conservative	Jake Stewart	14,218	43.7	+8.0	$105,621.33
Liberal	Lisa Harris	12,762	39.3	+2.5	$61,063.68
New Democratic	Bruce Potter	2,291	7.0	-1.3	$0.00
People's	Ron Nowlan	1,839	5.7	+2.3	$7,358.46
Green	Patricia Deitch	1,393	4.3	-7.0	$0.00
Total valid votes/expense limit		32,503	99.1	–	$106,042.83
Total rejected ballots		306	0.9		
Turnout		32,809	67.3		
Eligible voters		48,779			
Conservative gain from Liberal		Swing		+2.8	
Source: Elections Canada

2019 Canadian federal election
Party	Candidate	Votes	%	±%	Expenditures
Liberal	Pat Finnigan	12,722	36.77	-10.54	$60,001.00
Conservative	Peggy McLean	12,352	35.70	+1.39	$77,010.45
Green	Patty Deitch	3,914	11.31	+8.29	$1,989.98
New Democratic	Eileen Clancy Teslenko	2,875	8.31	-7.06	$949.65
People's	Ron Nowlan	1,179	3.41	-	none listed
Independent	Allison MacKenzie	1,160	3.35	-	$13,665.83
Independent	Mathew Grant Lawson	396	1.14	-	$444.70
Total valid votes/expense limit		34,598	100.00		
Total rejected ballots		517			
Turnout		35,115			
Eligible voters		48,240			
Liberal hold		Swing		-5.90	
Source: Elections Canada

2015 Canadian federal election
Party	Candidate	Votes	%	±%	Expenditures
Liberal	Pat Finnigan	17,202	47.31	+25.94	$48,194.18
Conservative	Tilly O'Neill-Gordon	12,476	34.31	-18.88	$77,944.90
New Democratic	Patrick Colford	5,588	15.37	-7.49	$25,196.78
Green	Matthew Ian Clark	1,098	3.02	+0.56	$218.93
Total valid votes/expense limit		36,364	100.00		$202,025.63
Total rejected ballots		256	0.70	–	
Turnout		36,620	76.04	–	
Eligible voters		48,158			
Liberal gain from Conservative		Swing		+22.41	
Source: Elections Canada

2011 federal election redistributed results
Party	Vote	%
Conservative	18,352	53.19
New Democratic	7,888	22.86
Liberal	7,373	21.37
Green	850	2.46
Independent	41	0.12

=== Miramichi, 1987–2013 ===
Graph of election results in Miramichi (1987–2013, minor parties that never got 2% of the vote or didn't run consistently are omitted)

2011 Canadian federal election
Party	Candidate	Votes	%	±%	Expenditures
Conservative	Tilly O'Neill-Gordon	16,112	52.36	+10.29	$65,248.98
New Democratic	Patrick Colford	7,097	23.06	+5.95	$3,027.50
Liberal	Keith Vickers	6,800	22.10	-14.85	$42,704.81
Green	Ron Mazerolle	735	2.39	-1.46	$1,101.75
Total valid votes/expense limit		30,774	100.0		$80,868.15
Total rejected, unmarked and declined ballots		348	1.12	-0.12	
Turnout		31,092	71.40	+5.62	
Eligible voters		43,547			
Conservative hold		Swing		+2.17	

2008 Canadian federal election
Party	Candidate	Votes	%	±%	Expenditures
Conservative	Tilly O'Neill-Gordon	12,058	42.07	+8.00	$43,226.70
Liberal	Charles Hubbard	10,590	36.95	-5.32	$29,196.67
New Democratic	Donald A. Doucet	4,904	17.11	+0.19	$4,709.46
Green	Todd Smith	1,105	3.85	+2.07	none listed
Total valid votes/expense limit		28,657	100.0		$78,462
Total rejected, unmarked and declined ballots		360	1.24	+0.17	
Turnout		29,017	65.78	-7.94	
Eligible voters		44,113			
Conservative gain from Liberal		Swing		+6.66	

2006 Canadian federal election
Party	Candidate	Votes	%	±%	Expenditures
Liberal	Charles Hubbard	13,960	42.27	-5.81	$33,385.25
Conservative	Michael Morrison	11,250	34.07	+5.04	$62,777.69
New Democratic	Jeannette Manuel-Allain	5,587	16.92	-1.46	$4,683.49
Independent	Danny Gay	1,640	4.97	–	$6,252.33
Green	John Bethell	587	1.78	-2.73	none listed
Total valid votes/expense limit		33,024	100.0		$73,328
Total rejected, unmarked and declined ballots		359	1.07	-1.45	
Turnout		33,383	73.72		
Eligible voters		45,284			
Liberal hold		Swing		+5.42	

2004 Canadian federal election
Party	Candidate	Votes	%	±%	Expenditures
Liberal	Charles Hubbard	15,647	48.08	-1.19	$30,788.14
Conservative	Michael Morrison	9,448	29.03	-9.81	$36,154.69
New Democratic	Hilaire Rousselle	5,980	18.38	+6,49	$251.16
Green	Garry Sanipass	1,468	4.51	–	$2,119.41
Total valid votes/expense limit		32,543	100.0		$73,799
Total rejected, unmarked and declined ballots		841	2.52		
Turnout		33,384	65.42	-3.27	
Eligible voters		51,027			
Liberal notional hold		Swing		+4.31	
Changes from 2000 are based on redistributed results. Change for the Conservative Party is based on the combined results of its predecessors, the Progressive Conservatives and the Canadian Alliance.

2000 Canadian federal election
Party	Candidate	Votes	%	±%
Liberal	Charles Hubbard	17,047	51.44	+10.99
Progressive Conservative	David Kelly	8,341	25.17	-5.53
Alliance	Ken Clark	5,298	15.99	+2.43
New Democratic	Allan Goodfellow	2,453	7.40	-7.89
Total valid votes		33,139	100.00	

Change for the Canadian Alliance from 1997 are based on the results of its predecessor, the Reform Party.

2000 federal election redistributed results
Party	Vote	%
Liberal	17,109	49.27
Progressive Conservative	8,000	23.04
Alliance	5,487	15.80
New Democratic	4,130	11.89

1997 Canadian federal election
Party	Candidate	Votes	%	±%
Liberal	Charles Hubbard	13,924	40.45	-20.54
Progressive Conservative	Fernand Gibbs	10,570	30.70	+7.80
New Democratic	Allan Goodfellow	5,263	15.29	+10.18
Reform	Paul Doyle	4,668	13.56	+3.58
Total valid votes		34,425	100.00	

1993 Canadian federal election
Party	Candidate	Votes	%	±%
Liberal	Charles Hubbard	18,733	60.99	+10.18
Progressive Conservative	Peter Murphy	7,035	22.90	-9.53
Reform	Paul Doyle	3,064	9.98	Ø
New Democratic	Gordon Alliston	1,570	5.11	-0.98
Canada Party	Wilmot Ross	314	1.02	Ø
Total valid votes		30,716	100.00	

1988 Canadian federal election
Party	Candidate	Votes	%	±%
Liberal	Maurice Dionne	14,073	50.81	+13.12
Progressive Conservative	Bud Jardine	8,983	32.43	-21.51
Confederation of Regions	Arch Pafford	2,954	10.67	Ø
New Democratic	Frank Clancy	1,686	6.09	-2.28
Total valid votes		27,696	100.00	

=== Northumberland—Miramichi, 1955–1987 ===
Graph of election results in Northumberland—Miramichi (1955–1987, minor parties that never got 2% of the vote or didn't run consistently are omitted)

1984 Canadian federal election
Party	Candidate	Votes	%	±%
Progressive Conservative	Bud Jardine	17,134	53.94	+26.11
Liberal	Maurice Dionne	11,971	37.69	-17.10
New Democratic	Jerry Dunnett	2,660	8.37	-9.01
Total valid votes		31,765	100.00	

1980 Canadian federal election
Party	Candidate	Votes	%	±%
Liberal	Maurice Dionne	14,799	54.79	+7.06
Progressive Conservative	Robert McAllister	7,517	27.83	-7.22
New Democratic	Jerry Dunnett	4,694	17.38	+0.15
Total valid votes		27,010		
lop.parl.ca

1979 Canadian federal election
Party	Candidate	Votes	%	±%
Liberal	Maurice Dionne	12,893	47.73	-4.95
Progressive Conservative	John Trevors	9,467	35.05	-1.02
New Democratic	Jerry Dunnett	4,653	17.23	+7.66
Total valid votes		27,013	100.00	

1974 Canadian federal election
Party	Candidate	Votes	%	±%
Liberal	Maurice Dionne	12,648	52.68	+5.43
Progressive Conservative	John Trevors	8,661	36.07	-2.90
New Democratic	Ray LeBreton	2,297	9.57	-0.90
Social Credit	Fernand Sonier	405	1.69	-1.62
Total valid votes		24,011	100.00	

1972 Canadian federal election
Party	Candidate	Votes	%	±%
Liberal	Percy Smith	10,922	47.25	-5.71
Progressive Conservative	Robert McAllister	9,007	38.97	-1.44
New Democratic	Ray LeBreton	2,419	10.47	+3.83
Social Credit	Joseph Goguen	765	3.31	Ø
Total valid votes		23,113	100.00	

1968 Canadian federal election
Party	Candidate	Votes	%	±%
Liberal	Percy Smith	10,292	52.96	+1.31
Progressive Conservative	Bernard Flam	7,853	40.41	+5.15
New Democratic	Edward Quinn	1,290	6.64	-6.45
Total valid votes		19,435	100.00	

1965 Canadian federal election
Party	Candidate	Votes	%	±%
Liberal	George Roy McWilliam	9,564	51.65	-4.91
Progressive Conservative	Wilson Weldon	6,529	35.26	+0.12
New Democratic	Ronald Kelly	2424	13.09	+8.39
Total valid votes		18,517	100.00	

1963 Canadian federal election
Party	Candidate	Votes	%	±%
Liberal	George Roy McWilliam	10,148	56.56	+3.96
Progressive Conservative	Adé Theriault	6,305	35.14	-2.16
New Democratic	John Currie	844	4.70	-1.41
Social Credit	Fidèle Bourque	646	3.60	-0.39
Total valid votes		17,943	100.00	

1962 Canadian federal election
Party	Candidate	Votes	%	±%
Liberal	George Roy McWilliam	9,899	52.60	+0.16
Progressive Conservative	Edward Leggatt	7,020	37.30	-10.26
New Democratic	John Currie	1,150	6.11	Ø
Social Credit	Wilton Newell	750	3.99	Ø
Total valid votes		18,819	100.00	

1958 Canadian federal election
Party	Candidate	Votes	%	±%
Liberal	George Roy McWilliam	10,206	52.44	-1.11
Progressive Conservative	John Leroy Betts	9,257	47.56	+6.16
Total valid votes		19,463	100.00	

1957 Canadian federal election
Party	Candidate	Votes	%	±%
Liberal	George Roy McWilliam	8,582	53.55	-10.78
Progressive Conservative	Joseph Ryan	6,635	41.40	+10.60
Co-operative Commonwealth	Paul Lordon	808	5.04	+0.17
Total valid votes		16,025	100.00	

=== Northumberland, 1867–1955 ===
Graph of election results in Northumberland (1867–1955, minor parties that never got 2% of the vote or didn't run consistently are omitted)

1953 Canadian federal election
Party	Candidate	Votes	%	±%
Liberal	George Roy McWilliam	10,666	64.33	+8.70
Progressive Conservative	George Somers	5,107	30.80	-8.66
Co-operative Commonwealth	Paul Lordon	808	4.87	+2.97
Total valid votes		16,581	100.00	

1949 Canadian federal election
Party	Candidate	Votes	%	±%
Liberal	George Roy McWilliam	9,840	55.63	-6.66
Progressive Conservative	Benjamin Cleland	6,980	39.46	+1.75
Independent	Elmer MacKinnon	533	3.01	Ø
Co-operative Commonwealth	Paul Hansen	336	1.90	Ø
Total valid votes		17,689	100.00	

1945 Canadian federal election
Party	Candidate	Votes	%	±%
Liberal	John William Maloney	8,507	62.29	+22.97
Progressive Conservative	Joseph Leonard O'Brien	5,149	37.71	-2.20
Total valid votes		13,656	100.00	

1940 Canadian federal election
Party	Candidate	Votes	%	±%
Conservative	Joseph Leonard O'Brien	5,149	39.91	+16.01
Liberal	John William Maloney	5,072	39.32	-16.67
Independent Liberal	John Patrick Barry	2,679	20.77	-35.52
Total valid votes		12,900	100.00	

1935 Canadian federal election
Party	Candidate	Votes	%	±%
Liberal	John Patrick Barry	7,662	56.29	+15.24
Conservative	John Creaghan	3,253	23.90	-35.05
Reconstruction	Frances Fish	2,697	19.81	Ø
Total valid votes		13,612	100.00	

1930 Canadian federal election
Party	Candidate	Votes	%	±%
Conservative	George Manning McDade	8,095	58.95	+11.11
Liberal	George Burchill	5,637	41.05	-11.11
Total valid votes		13,732	100.00	
Source: lop.parl.ca

1926 Canadian federal election
Party	Candidate	Votes	%	±%
Liberal	Charles Joseph Morrissy	6,201	52.16	+10.68
Conservative	Charles Elijah Fish	5,687	47.84	-10.68
Total valid votes		11,888	100.00	

1925 Canadian federal election
Party	Candidate	Votes	%	±%
Conservative	Charles Elijah Fish	5,331	58.52	+11.23
Liberal	Frederick Tweedie	3,779	41.48	-11.23
Total valid votes		9,110	100.00	

Canadian federal by-election, 7 October 1924
Party	Candidate	Votes	%	±%
On John Morrissy's death, 31 July 1924
Liberal	William Bunting Snowball	6,222	52.71	-3.22
Conservative	Clifford Patrick Hickey	5,583	47.29	+3.22
Total valid votes		11,805	100.00	

1921 Canadian federal election
Party	Candidate	Votes	%	±%
Liberal	John Morrissy	6,706	55.93	+12.28
Conservative	Edward McCurdy	5,285	44.07	-12.28
Total valid votes		11,991	100.00	

1917 Canadian federal election
Party	Candidate	Votes	%	±%
Government (Unionist)	William Stewart Loggie	4,648	56.35	+9.69
Opposition (Laurier Liberals)	John Morrissy	3,601	43.65	-9.69
Total valid votes		8,249	100.00	

Unionist candidate W. S. Loggie's change from 1911 is based on the Conservative Party's results. His personal vote increased by 3.01% over his 1911 result running as a Liberal candidate.

1911 Canadian federal election
Party	Candidate	Votes	%	±%
Liberal	William Stewart Loggie	3,128	53.34	-4.97
Conservative	Donald Morrison	2,736	46.66	+4.97
Total valid votes		5,864	100.00	

1908 Canadian federal election
Party	Candidate	Votes	%	±%
Liberal	William Stewart Loggie	3,223	58.31	+5.40
Conservative	Donald Morrison	2,304	41.69	-5.40
Total valid votes		5,527	100.00	

1904 Canadian federal election
Party	Candidate	Votes	%	±%
Liberal	William Stewart Loggie	2,589	52.91	+6.78
Conservative	James Robinson	2,304	47.09	-6.78
Total valid votes		4,893	100.00	

1900 Canadian federal election
Party	Candidate	Votes	%	±%
Conservative	James Robinson	2225	53.87	+5.53
Liberal	John Morrissy	1905	46.13	+8.81
Total valid votes		4130	100.00	

Change for Liberal candidate John Morrissy are based on the 1896 Liberal Party's results. His personal vote increased by 31.79% over his 1896 result running as an independent candidate.

1896 Canadian federal election
Party	Candidate	Votes	%	±%
Conservative	James Robinson	2,225	48.34	-7.71
Liberal	Peter Mitchell	1,718	37.32	-6.63
Independent	John Morrissy	660	14.34	Ø
Total valid votes		4,603	100.00	

Canadian federal by-election, 6 February 1896
Party	Candidate	Votes	%	±%
On Mr. Adams being called to the Senate, 7-1-1896
Conservative	James Robinson	acclaimed	NA	NA

1891 Canadian federal election
Party	Candidate	Votes	%	±%
Conservative	Michael Adams	2,192	56.05	+15.88
Independent Liberal	Peter Mitchell	1,719	43.95	-15.88
Total valid votes		3,911	100.00	

1887 Canadian federal election
Party	Candidate	Votes	%	±%
Independent Liberal	Peter Mitchell	2,271	59.83	n/a
Conservative	Michael Adams	1,525	40.17	Ø
Total valid votes		3796	100.00	

Canadian federal by-election, 6 February 1896
Party	Candidate	Votes	%	±%
On Mr. Adams being called to the Senate, 7-1-1896
Conservative	James Robinson	acclaimed	NA	NA

1882 Canadian federal election
Party	Candidate	Votes	%	±%
Independent	Peter Mitchell	acclaimed	n/a	n/a

Canadian federal by-election, 5 February 1878
Party	Candidate	Votes	%	±%
Mitchell resigned his seat and re-offered after being accused of violating the Independence of Parliament Act by leasing a building to the government while he was a senator.

1878 Canadian federal election
Party	Candidate	Votes	%	±%
Liberal	Jabez Bunting Snowball	1,585	53.38	+14.92
Independent	Peter Mitchell	1,384	46.62	-14.92
Total valid votes		2,969	100.00	

1874 Canadian federal election
Party	Candidate	Votes	%	±%
Independent	Peter Mitchell	1,312	61.54	n/a
Unknown	Jabez Bunting Snowball	820	38.46	Ø
Total valid votes		2,132	100.00	
Source: lop.parl.ca

1872 Canadian federal election
Party	Candidate	Votes	%	±%
Independent	Peter Mitchell	acclaimed	n/a	n/a
Source: Canadian Elections Database

Canadian federal by-election, 24 December 1868
Party	Candidate	Votes	%	±%
On the death of John Mercer Johnson, 11 August 1868
Liberal	Richard Hutchison	1,133	55.90	-5.93
Unknown	? Gough	894	44.10	Ø
Total valid votes		2,027	100.00	

1867 Canadian federal election
Party	Candidate	Votes	%
Liberal	John Mercer Johnson	1,226	61.83
Unknown	Thomas F. Gillespie	757	38.17
Total valid votes		1,983	100.00
Source: Canadian Elections Database

== See also ==
- List of Canadian electoral districts
- Historical federal electoral districts of Canada
