= Michael Adams (Canadian politician) =

Canadian politician

The Honourable Michael Adams QC
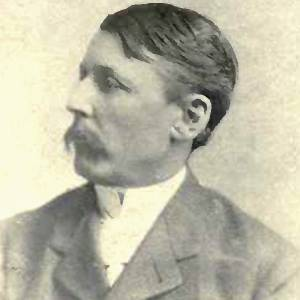

Senator for Northumberland, New Brunswick
- In office January 7, 1896 – January 2, 1899
- Appointed by: Mackenzie Bowell

Member of the Canadian Parliament for Northumberland
- In office 1891–1896
- Preceded by: Peter Mitchell
- Succeeded by: James Robinson

MLA for Northumberland
- In office 1870–1874
- In office 1878–1887

Personal details
- Born: August 13, 1845 Douglastown, Parish of Newcastle, New Brunswick
- Died: January 2, 1899 (aged 53) Newcastle Parish, New Brunswick
- Party: Conservative
- Cabinet: Provincial Surveyor General (1878–1883)

Michael Adams QC (August 13, 1845 – January 2, 1899) was a Canadian politician.

Born in Douglastown, Parish of Newcastle, New Brunswick, of Irish descent, Adams was educated in Douglastown. He was married twice: first, in 1869, to Miss Catherine L. Patterson, and second, on November 29, 1882, to Miss Nealis. He was called to the Bar of New Brunswick on October 14, 1868, and was appointed a Queen's Counsel in February 1891.

Adams held a seat in the Legislative Assembly of New Brunswick from 1870 to 1874, and also from 1878 to 1887. A member of the Executive Council, he was Surveyor-General from July 13, 1878, to February 26, 1883. He resigned in 1887 to run for the House of Commons of Canada, but was defeated in the 1887 federal election. He was first elected to the House of Commons for the riding of Northumberland, at the general election held in 1891, and continued to sit until January 1896, when he was called to the Senate of Canada, representing the senatorial division of Northumberland, New Brunswick.

A Conservative, he died at home in 1899 while still in office.

Adams was involved in several businesses, including the Adams Mining Company of Leadville, Colorado, which included his brothers John J. Adams (1848-1919), a member of the United States House of Representatives, and Samuel Adams (1846-1928), a member of the Colorado State Senate.
