= James Robinson (New Brunswick politician) =

Canadian politician

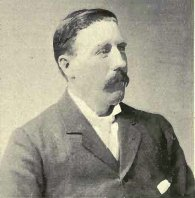

Member of the Canadian Parliament for Northumberland
- In office 1896–1904
- Preceded by: Michael Adams
- Succeeded by: William Stewart Loggie

Personal details
- Born: March 6, 1852 Derby, New Brunswick, British North America
- Died: October 16, 1932 (aged 80) Newcastle, New Brunswick, Canada
- Party: Conservative
- Occupation: Lumberman, merchant

James Robinson (March 6, 1852 – October 16, 1932) was a Canadian politician.

Born in Derby, New Brunswick of parents who came from Scotland, Robinson was educated in Derby. A merchant and lumberman, he was a manager of the South-West Miramichi Boom & Lumber Company. He was also a director of the Newcastle Miramichi Spool Factory, Limited. He was a county councillor and warden of the county. He was a Conservative member of the Legislative Assembly of New Brunswick from January 1890 until January 1896 when he resigned to run for the House of Commons of Canada. He was elected in an 1896 by-election for the electoral district of Northumberland when the current MP, Michael Adams, was summoned to the Senate of Canada. A Conservative, he was re-elected in the 1896 and 1900 elections. He was defeated in the 1904 election.

In 1877, he married Grace Macdonald.

== Electoral record ==
1904 Canadian federal election: Northumberland
Party	Candidate	Votes	%	±%
Liberal	William Stewart Loggie	2,589	52.91	+6.78
Conservative	James Robinson	2,304	47.09	-6.78
Total valid votes		4,893	100.00	

1900 Canadian federal election: Northumberland
Party	Candidate	Votes	%	±%
Conservative	James Robinson	2225	53.87	+5.53
Liberal	John Morrissy	1905	46.13	+8.81
Total valid votes		4130	100.00	

Change for Liberal candidate John Morrissy are based on the 1896 Liberal Party's results. His personal vote increased by 31.79% over his 1896 result running as an independent candidate.

1896 Canadian federal election: Northumberland
Party	Candidate	Votes	%	±%
Conservative	James Robinson	2,225	48.34	-7.71
Liberal	Peter Mitchell	1,718	37.32	-6.63
Independent	John Morrissy	660	14.34	Ø
Total valid votes		4,603	100.00	

Canadian federal by-election, 6 February 1896
Party	Candidate	Votes	%	±%
On Mr. Adams being called to the Senate, 7-1-1896
Conservative	James Robinson	acclaimed	NA	NA
