= Charles Elijah Fish =

Canadian politician

Member of the Canadian Parliament for Northumberland
- In office 1925–1926
- Preceded by: William Bunting Snowball
- Succeeded by: Charles Joseph Morrissy

Personal details
- Born: January 5, 1854 Newcastle, New Brunswick, British North America
- Died: July 3, 1933 (aged 79)
- Party: Conservative
- Spouse: Annie Willard
- Children: Frances Fish
- Occupation: Building contractor, businessman, lumber merchant

Charles Elijah Fish (January 5, 1854 – July 3, 1933) was a businessman and political figure in New Brunswick, Canada. He represented Northumberland County in the Legislative Assembly of New Brunswick from 1899 to 1903 and Northumberland in the House of Commons of Canada from 1925 to 1926 as a Conservative member.

He was born and educated in Newcastle, New Brunswick, the son of the lumber and flour merchant James A. Fish and Elizabeth McAllister. He was a lieutenant in the local militia. Fish became a lumber merchant and building contractor, in 1885 purchasing the French Fort Cove quarry in Newcastle and securing that year the contract to supply sandstone for construction of the Langevin Block in Ottawa.

Fish later served on the council for Northumberland County, also serving as county warden, and was at one time mayor of Newcastle. Serving just two years as a Member of Parliament, he was defeated in a bid for reelection to the House of Commons in 1926.

He married Annie Willard and their daughter, Frances Lillian Fish became a lawyer, the first woman admitted to the Nova Scotia Bar.

== Electoral record ==
1926 Canadian federal election: Northumberland
Party	Candidate	Votes	%	±%
Liberal	Charles Joseph Morrissy	6,201	52.16	+10.68
Conservative	Charles Elijah Fish	5,687	47.84	-10.68
Total valid votes		11,888	100.00	

1925 Canadian federal election: Northumberland
Party	Candidate	Votes	%	±%
Conservative	Charles Elijah Fish	5,331	58.52	+11.23
Liberal	Frederick Tweedie	3,779	41.48	-11.23
Total valid votes		9,110	100.00	
