= William A. Park =

Canadian politician

William Adam Park (June 27, 1853 – June 8, 1924) was a lawyer and political figure in New Brunswick. He represented Northumberland County in the Legislative Assembly of New Brunswick from 1882 to 1888 as a Liberal-Conservative member.

He was born in Newcastle, New Brunswick, the son of William Park, and was educated in Northumberland County. He was called to the bar in 1876. Park served as warden for the county.
