= Maurice Dionne =

Canadian politician

Member of Parliament for Northumberland—Miramichi
- In office 1974–1984
- Preceded by: Percy Smith
- Succeeded by: Bud Jardine
- In office 1988–1993
- Succeeded by: Charles Hubbard

Personal details
- Born: Maurice Adrian Dionne; August 26, 1936 Bath, New Brunswick
- Died: November 17, 2003 (aged 67) Miramichi, New Brunswick
- Party: Liberal
- Profession: educator

Maurice Dionne (August 26, 1936 – November 17, 2003) was an educator and politician in the Miramichi River Valley of New Brunswick, Canada.

== Early life ==
Born in Bath, New Brunswick, Dionne attended teacher's college and taught in a variety of locations, including Baie-Comeau, Quebec, where he met his future wife, Precille. Dionne moved to the Miramichi to become principal of Millerton High School.

== Political career ==
Dionne was long active in Liberal Party of Canada circles, and was elected to the House of Commons of Canada, serving from 1974 to 1984 and again from 1988 to 1993. He lost his seat in 1984, when Brian Mulroney's Progressive Conservative Party of Canada won the largest landslide in terms of total seats in Canadian history. During these years out of office, he worked in the forestry industry in a consulting capacity.

As a Member of Parliament, Dionne's major accomplishments were securing government assistance to aid expansion to the major pulp mill in the valley, securing the dredging of the entrance to the Miramichi River to enable ports there to continue receiving ocean-going vessels, and securing the construction of a federal maximum security prison at Renous in the valley.

In 1992, Dionne called a press conference to announce that he was suffering from Alzheimer's disease. This was one of the first occasions that a public figure made such an announcement, and it helped to create understanding of the affliction. Dionne did not run in the next election, and died in 2003.

== Personal life ==
Dionne and his wife had two daughters and three sons.
