= W. S. Loggie =

Canadian politician

William Stewart Loggie
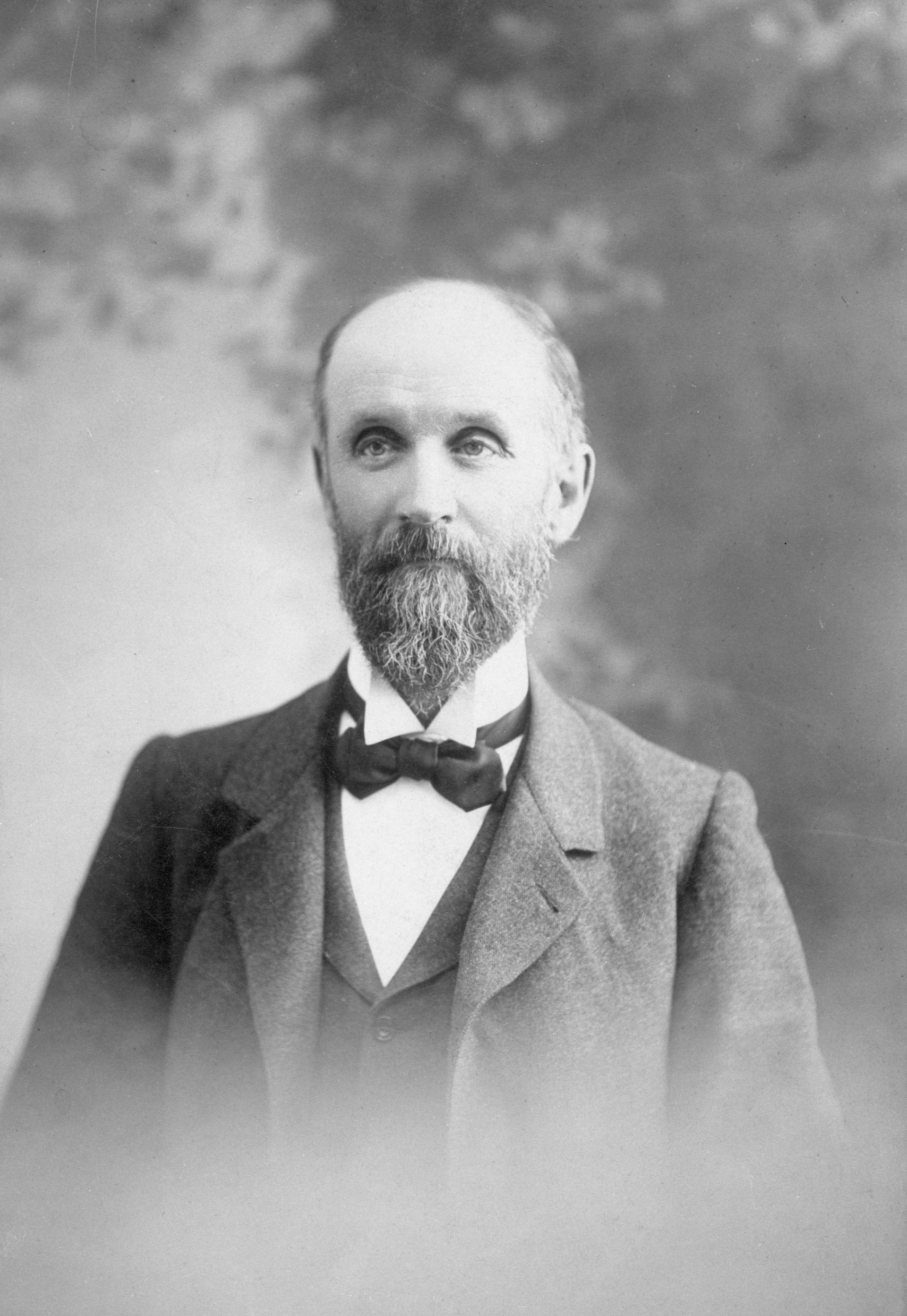
- Loggie after 1906

Member of the Canadian Parliament for Northumberland
- In office 1904–1921
- Preceded by: James Robinson
- Succeeded by: John Morrissy

Personal details
- Born: August 10, 1850 Burnt Church, New Brunswick, Canada
- Died: March 13, 1944 (aged 93)
- Party: Liberal

William Stewart Loggie (August 10, 1850 – March 13, 1944) was a merchant and politician of the town of Chatham, New Brunswick, Canada.

Born in Burnt Church, New Brunswick, Loggie, a dynamic man, built a small empire throughout the Miramichi River area. He bought fish directly from the fishermen, and packed and exported it. As well he operated a large retail business, with hardware, clothing, footwear and grocery stores in Chatham, and general stores in smaller communities in outlying villages. Loggie was also a shipowner and bought and exported lumber.

Loggie sat as the Liberal Party of New Brunswick representative in the Legislative Assembly of New Brunswick for the riding of Northumberland from 1903 to 1904 when he resigned to run for the House of Commons of Canada in the general elections of 1904. A Liberal, he represented the riding of Northumberland from 1904 until 1917 when, as a result of the Conscription Crisis he ran for re-election as a Unionist supporting Sir Robert Borden's government. He did not run for re-election in 1921, retiring to private life.

When W. S. Loggie died in 1944, his son, J. Kerr Loggie, took over as president of W. S. Loggie and Sons. Kerr's health was failing by 1946 and his brother, Leigh Loggie, returned from the Peace River Country of Alberta where he operated a fur trading business and general store. He operated the company until his death in 1977. Leigh was a bachelor, and the business was wound down after his death.

W. S. Loggie's three-story Victorian Mansion on Wellington Street in Chatham is now a cultural centre.

== Electoral record ==
1921 Canadian federal election: Northumberland
Party	Candidate	Votes	%	±%
Liberal	John Morrissy	6,706	55.93	+12.28
Conservative	Edward McCurdy	5,285	44.07	-12.28
Total valid votes		11,991	100.00	

1917 Canadian federal election: Northumberland
Party	Candidate	Votes	%	±%
Government (Unionist)	William Stewart Loggie	4,648	56.35	+9.69
Opposition (Laurier Liberals)	John Morrissy	3,601	43.65	-9.69
Total valid votes		8,249	100.00	

Unionist candidate W. S. Loggie's change from 1911 is based on the Conservative Party's results. His personal vote increased by 3.01% over his 1911 result running as a Liberal candidate.

1911 Canadian federal election: Northumberland
Party	Candidate	Votes	%	±%
Liberal	William Stewart Loggie	3,128	53.34	-4.97
Conservative	Donald Morrison	2,736	46.66	+4.97
Total valid votes		5,864	100.00	

1908 Canadian federal election: Northumberland
Party	Candidate	Votes	%	±%
Liberal	William Stewart Loggie	3,223	58.31	+5.40
Conservative	Donald Morrison	2,304	41.69	-5.40
Total valid votes		5,527	100.00	

1904 Canadian federal election: Northumberland
Party	Candidate	Votes	%	±%
Liberal	William Stewart Loggie	2,589	52.91	+6.78
Conservative	James Robinson	2,304	47.09	-6.78
Total valid votes		4,893	100.00	
