= Chatham, New Brunswick =

, New Brunswick, Canada

Coordinates: 47.033°N 65.433°W

Chatham (/ˈtʃætəm/) is an urban neighbourhood in the city of Miramichi, New Brunswick, Canada.

Prior to municipal amalgamation in 1995, Chatham was an incorporated town in Northumberland County along the south bank of the Miramichi River opposite Douglastown. Since amalgamation, it has been sometimes referred to as Miramichi East.

Communities amalgamated in 1995 to form the City of Miramichi, New Brunswick

== Impact of geography on history ==
Federal census population history of Chatham
Year	Pop.	±%
1901	4,868	—
1911	4,666	−4.1%
1921	4,506	−3.4%
1931	4,017	−10.9%
1941	4,082	+1.6%
1951	5,223	+28.0%
1956	6,332	+21.2%
1961	7,109	+12.3%
1966	8,136	+14.4%
1971	7,833	−3.7%
1976	7,601	−3.0%
1981	6,779	−10.8%
1981A	6,761	−0.3%
1986	6,219	−8.0%
1991	6,544	+5.2%
Source: Statistics Canada

At Chatham, the Miramichi River is quite wide, the water salty and tidal. Just downstream from the town, the river begins to widen into a broad estuary, where the Miramichi River gradually becomes Miramichi Bay. Because of its eastward facing location, ships coming from the British Isles in early times had easy access through the Strait of Belle Isle and across the Gulf of St. Lawrence. It was more accessible and safer to get to than the ports of Quebec City or Saint John, New Brunswick.

In colonial times, the surrounding lands were heavily forested; the stands of eastern white pine were especially valued for ships' masts. The river teemed with fish, Atlantic salmon the most prized. Abundant game roamed the forests, and berries were a valuable food supplement.

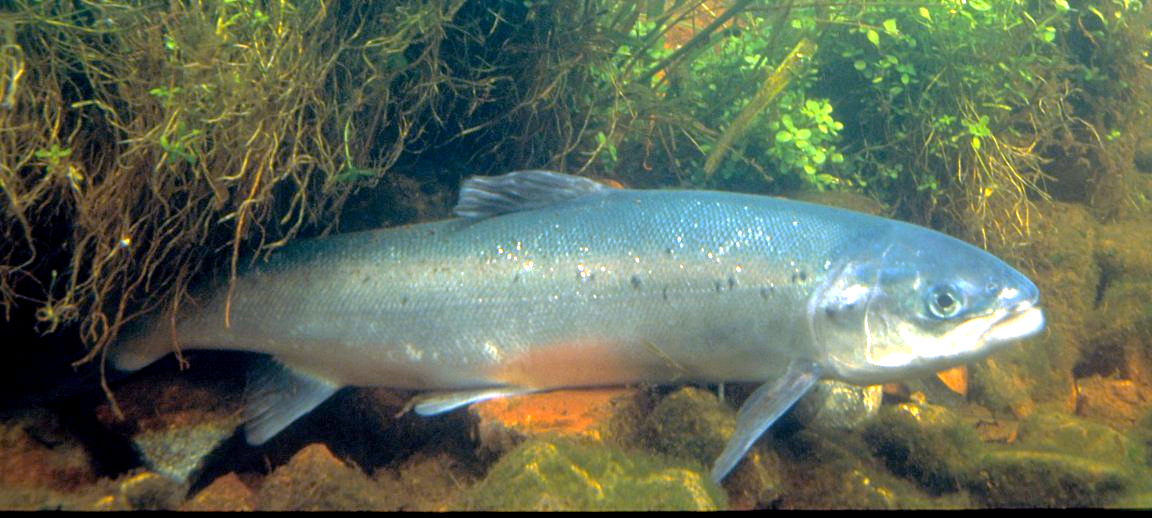
Atlantic Salmon

Scottish immigrants to the area found it familiar. The rocks in the Miramichi are similar to those of Scotland, being a part of the same formation before continental drift separated them. Seabirds and fish are often the same or similar. The Atlantic salmon, the herring gull and the common tern were found in both areas. The Scots had the technology and know-how to cut lumber, fish, farm and build ships. The Irish immigrants did not bring the same skills, as their forests had long been cut down and they did not have such a well-developed fishing industry. They picked up skills from their neighbours. As urban English immigrants did not have these skills, and farmers were used to a more moderate climate, they tended to settle elsewhere.

At Chatham, the river banks are low but not subject to flooding, and are thus well suited as a location for wharves. With a deep channel close to the shore, the largest ships in colonial times could approach the wharves. Away from the shore, the land gradually rises several hundred feet. The soil, while sandy and a bit acid, supports potatoes, root crops and apple trees. All these circumstances made Chatham an ideal location for lumbering and fishing.

== History ==
=== Early settlement ===
In 1765, the troop transport Pitt (reputedly named after William Pitt, 1st Earl of Chatham) was shipwrecked in the Gulf of St Lawrence. Tradition holds that one of the ship's boats, named the "Chatham", washed up near the Miramichi River, giving rise to the town's name.

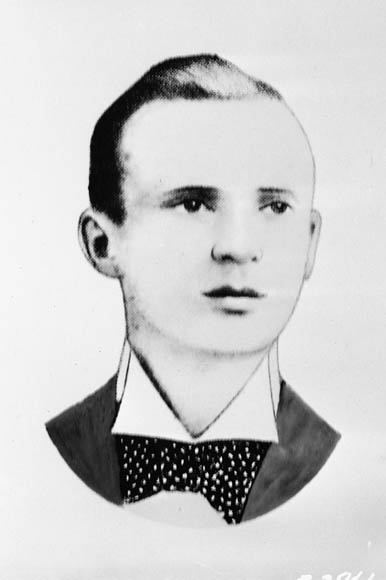
R.B. Bennett, future Prime Minister of Canada, first entered politics in Chatham.

In 1800 Francis Peabody, a successful businessman, settled in the location that became Chatham, which was then known as The Spruce, after a large spruce tree. The Miramichi River is nearly a mile wide here. Its channel comes very close to the shore at this spot, so it was a natural place to build wharves. Logs from the large watershed of the river could easily be floated to this point for milling and export. The best salmon fisheries were nearby.

Other settlers followed, but growth was relatively slow throughout the early part of the 19th century. The first newspaper published in the North Shore of New Brunswick was the Mercury, founded in Chatham in 1825. By 1834 the first bank opened. A stage coach left each Monday for Fredericton. The settlement attracted a group of aggressive entrepreneurs, Scottish and English, such as Joseph Cunard, William Muirhead, Jabez Bunting Snowball, and later, W. S. Loggie. Gradually, the community became a centre for lumber mills, shipbuilding, and exporting fish and forest products to the British Isles and, later on, to the United States.

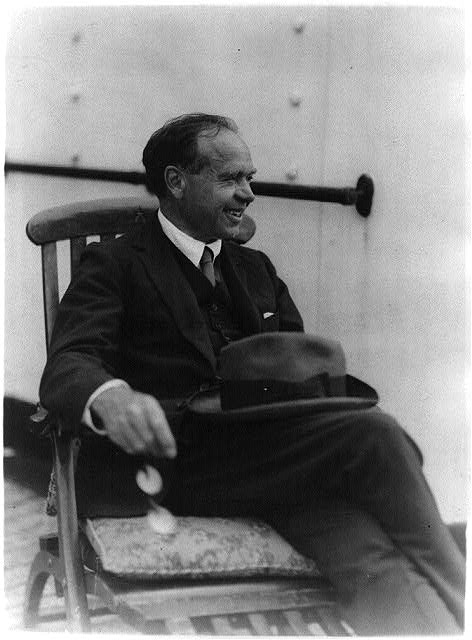
Lord Beaverbrook

In its early days, Chatham was bustling, energetic, growing and confident. Chatham attracted the Maritime lawyer Richard Bedford Bennett, later to be prime minister of Canada. In 1896 when Chatham held its first elections for Town Council, the young Bennett was elected by one vote. He was then employed with the law firm established by Lemuel Tweedie, a former Lieutenant-Governor of New Brunswick. Bennett's campaign manager was a 17-year-old "articling" student by the name of Max Aitken. Aitken grew up in Newcastle and would later become Lord Beaverbrook. He was appointed the Minister for Aircraft Production in Winston Churchill's World War II cabinet.

By 1851, Chatham had 505 employed persons among the following occupations: 170 labourers, 74 servants, 60 shipwrights, 25 joiners, 20 cordwainers, 19 farmers, 16 clerks, 13 blacksmiths, 12 merchants, 10 tailors, 9 storekeepers, 7 sawyers, 7 teachers, 5 blockmakers, 4 sailmakers, 4 riggers, 4 stage drivers, 4 butchers, 4 printers, 3 clergymen, 1 sparmaker, 1 gunsmith, 1 surgeon and 1 constable.

A police force was started in 1858, telephones came to the town in 1880, and street lighting was installed in 1888.

In 1881, somewhat past the prime of sailing ships, the port of Chatham recorded the following annual traffic:

- 177 overseas vessels entered- 80,558 tons exported; 11,344 imported:
- 302 coastal vessels entered—98,023 tons exported (value $797,179).

In 1881, the value of bank deposits was $133,118.

Chatham was incorporated as a town in 1896. A large wooden hotel, The Adams House operated from 1884 to the 1950s. The four-storey, brick Touraine Hotel was opened in 1908. It was destroyed by fire just after World War II. The hotel was on a branch line of the Canadian National Railways, which brought tourists from Quebec.

=== Heyday ===
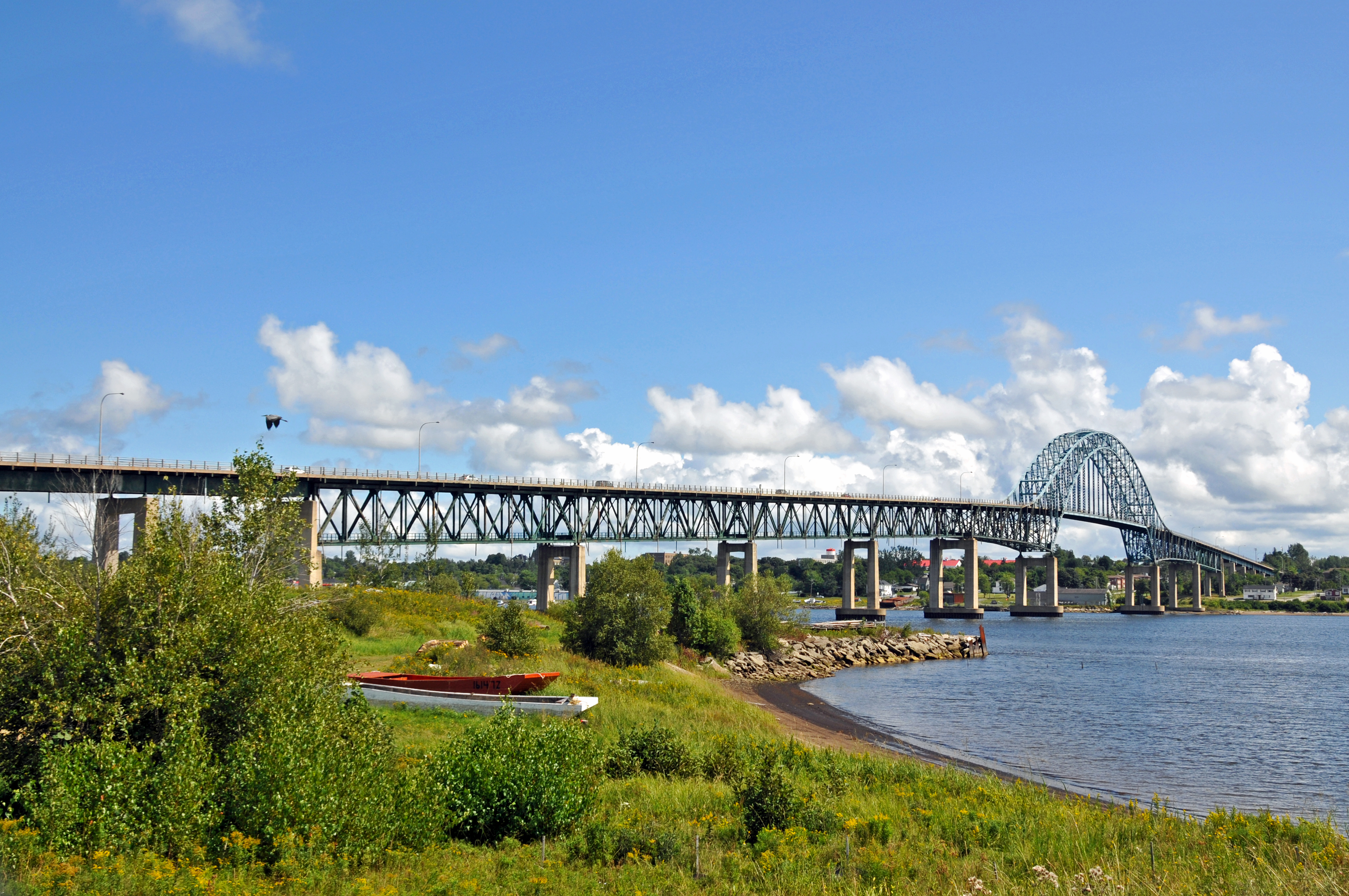
Centennial (Miramichi) Bridge

Chatham in its prime (1880–1919) had extensive wharves, a pulp mill, three large sawmills, a fish-packing plant, a large foundry/shipbuilding facility with a repair yard for small vessels, an armoury, several sizeable hotels; a Catholic hospital (Hotel Dieu) and associated nursing home as well as a Nursing School, all run by the Religious Hospitallers of St. Joseph; three secondary schools, a Catholic liberal arts college, the county poor house (the County Home), a race track, an indoor rink, a golf club, facilities for an agricultural exhibition, and several notable churches. The Anglican Church and Rectory were beautiful wood structures. The church burned down in 1960, but the rectory survived and remained in use until 1974.

The town was a service and shopping centre for the surrounding area, especially the areas farther down the bay. Students boarded at the Catholic girls and boys schools, and the Catholic college in town. During the period, 1880 to 1960, the Catholic Church was a major employer in Chatham, being especially important after the mills began to close.

The New Brunswick Electric Power Commission opened a thermal generation plant in Chatham in 1948. It produced 12,500 kilowatt hours and operated for some years, creating some employment.

Until 1967 a ferry boat provided service across the Miramichi River at Chatham, except during the period of winter freeze up. When the Centennial Bridge was opened, the ferry was no longer needed.

== Catholic religious centre ==
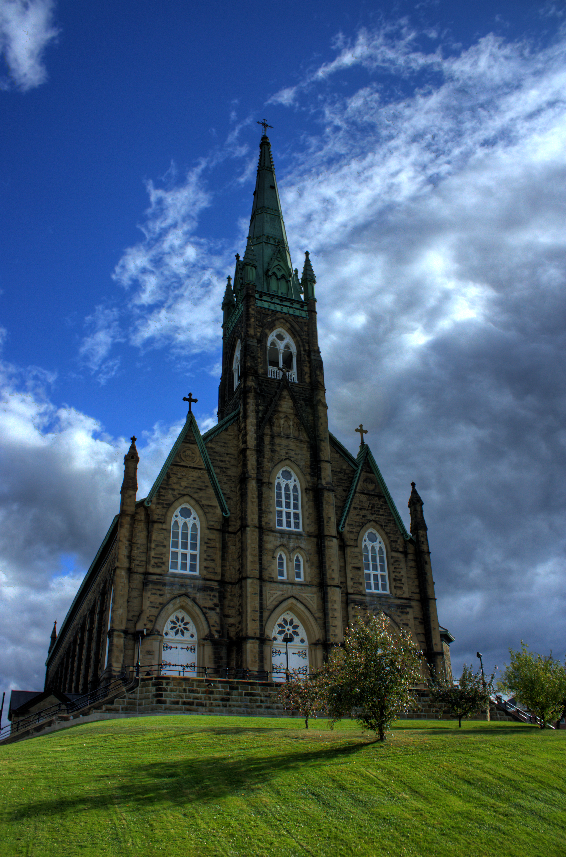
St. Michael's Basilica

The town is dominated by a large Roman Catholic church, St. Michael's Basilica. This neogothic structure was formerly a cathedral. Next to it, in the same style, is the former bishop's residence, now a convent. From 1860 to 1938 Chatham was the centre of a large Catholic diocese covering the northern part of New Brunswick. The Diocese of Chatham was moved to Bathurst, New Brunswick, in 1938. The Bishop at the time was Bishop Chaisson. The local lore has it that the move took place in the middle of the night so that the local residents would not know.

Following the move of the See from Chatham to Bathurst, the Church was petitioned by local residents to be removed from the Diocese of Bathurst. They wanted to become part of the Diocese of Saint John, New Brunswick. A circle around the Parish of Chatham still designates it as part of the Diocese of Saint John, not Bathurst.

A Catholic religious order, the Religious Hospitaliers of St. Joseph, established the Hotel Dieu and nursing home, as well as the large elementary/secondary school (St. Michael's Academy). While the nuns are still present as of 2005, their numbers have been much reduced. The Basilian Fathers operated a small liberal arts college, which was later taken over by the Diocese. It evolved into St. Thomas University, now located in Fredericton. The last convocation ceremony held in Chatham for St. Thomas University was in May 1964.

== Ethnic and religious composition ==
Historically, Chatham has been a majority-Catholic town, with smaller United Church, Anglican, and Presbyterian congregations. Various other Protestant denominations have come and gone, though the Pentecostals have been relatively strong. When it was more of a business centre, the town long had several Jewish families; their numbers have declined.

Ethnic backgrounds are Irish, Scottish, English, and French, with the latter gaining somewhat in recent years. Catholic Lebanese immigrants settled here, originally calling themselves Assyrian. Several Norwegian families also immigrated.

== Slow decline ==
Chatham achieved peak prosperity during the years immediately prior to World War I, but even then its main export was people. During the war, many young men from Chatham joined the 132nd Battalion of the North Shore Regiment. Many were killed or wounded at Vimy Ridge and on the Somme. The postwar depression of 1919 hit the town, resulting in a major employer, the Snowball sawmill, closing permanently. Young men and women moved to New England to seek work where many had relatives.

World War II saw the opening of RCAF Station Chatham, providing an economic stimulus for the town until its closure in 1996. RCAF Station Chatham was established as part of the British Commonwealth Air Training Plan. After the war, many different aircraft were deployed at Chatham. RCAF Station Chatham was the site where the Golden Hawks Aerobatic Team was formed before it was moved. The Golden Hawks were a precursor to the current 431 Air Demonstration Squadron, or "Snowbirds".

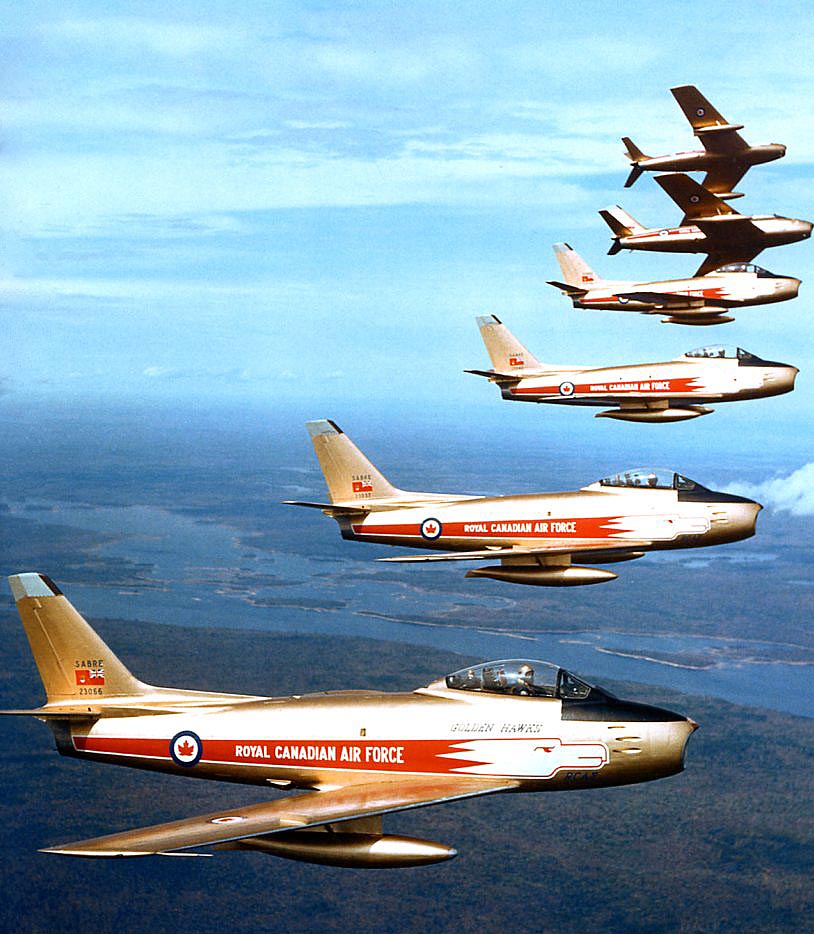
Golden Hawks, 1959

The primary purpose of the base was to train navigators for flight crews serving in the European Theatre. During the 1960s and 1970s, the base, renamed CFB Chatham in 1968, was an important staging ground for CF-101 Voodoo fighter interceptors, which were under command of NORAD to interdict Soviet nuclear bombers that could have challenged Canadian airspace in Atlantic Canada. The Soviet bombers (predominately the "Bear") flew the circumpolar route from the Soviet Union to Cuba and enjoyed entering Canadian Airspace over Newfoundland to time the reaction of NORAD.

Chatham sent many sons to Europe during World War II as part of the North Shore Regiment. The North Shore Regiment joined the Royal Winnipeg Rifles and the North Nova Scotia Highlanders as the first wave of Canadian Troops to land during the invasion of Normandy. They landed at Juno Beach as part of Operation Overlord. Following the war, the North Shore Regiment was folded into the Royal New Brunswick Regiment (RNBR).

The postwar baby boom of the 1950s enabled the town to reach a peak population of 8,600 in 1961. The loss of St. Thomas University, which moved to Fredericton in 1964 adversely affected the town in combination with other changes. The closure of CFB Chatham in 1996 further reduced local employment. The nursing school run by the Religious Hospitaliers of St. Joseph closed soon after the move of St. Thomas University. The loss of these two educational institutions was both symbolic and contributed to Chatham's decline.

Over the years migrants from Chatham have moved to where the jobs were. In the mid to late nineteenth century, some left for lumbering opportunities in the United States in areas such as Maine, Wisconsin and Washington. Until the 1930s, the majority went to Boston as a center of business and industry. Few left during the Hungry Thirties. Right after World War II, Montreal seemed to offer opportunities. It was superseded as an attraction by growth in Toronto and other parts of Ontario.

Fredericton and Moncton were also work destinations from the 1950s onwards, with Halifax becoming more important after 1965. In recent years, Alberta has attracted more Chatham residents.

In 1996, the provincial government amalgamated the incorporated municipalities along the lower Miramichi River valley, creating the city of Miramichi. In 1998, the federal government opened a central processing site for the Canadian Firearms Program (CFP) in Chatham. The office is dedicated to implementing the Firearms Act, and will maintain the records of all registered firearms in the country. The office employs several hundred civil servants and has helped to offset employment losses from the base closure. CFP celebrated the 10th anniversary of the opening of Central Processing Site in Miramichi, New Brunswick in 2008.

Today, Chatham is known for its annual Irish Festival. It also has become something of a retirement community, offering good quality, affordable housing. The married quarters of the former military base have been converted to a retirement village, called RMI, or "Retirement Miramichi," which contains 276 units.

== Notable people ==
Chatham writer Raymond Fraser in Paris.

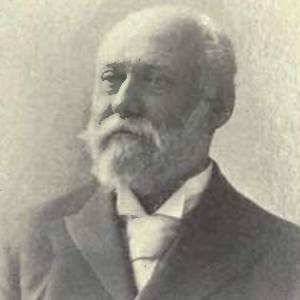
Jabez Bunting Snowball

- Richard Bedford Bennett, (1870-1947) Prime Minister of Canada
- Martin Cranney, (1795-1870) Irish immigrant who was elected as representative of Northumberland County in the 14th New Brunswick Legislative Assembly.
- Joseph Cunard, (1799-1865) of Halifax, a prosperous businessman who was the brother of Samuel, founder of the famous steamship line.
- Raymond Fraser, (1941-2018) novelist, story writer, poet, biographer.
- James M. Hill, (1899-1962) born and raised in Chatham, became Bishop of Victoria, British Columbia.
- John Mercer Johnson, (1819-1868) elected to the House of Assembly of New Brunswick. Also served in several appointed positions and was a Member of Parliament.
- Rick Knickle, NHL hockey player.
- Allan Legere, (1948-2026) serial killer also known as the Monster of the Miramichi
- W. S. Loggie, (1850-1944) was a Member of Parliament and a preeminent Chatham merchant of his era (1880–1925).
- Frank McKenna, (1948- ) former premier of New Brunswick and later Canadian Ambassador in Washington, was the member of the Legislative Assembly of New Brunswick for Chatham.
- John Ralston, (1964-) plays George Venturi on the Canadian Family Channel comedy Life with Derek.
- Jabez Bunting Snowball, (1837-1907) prominent entrepreneur and Lieutenant-Governor of New Brunswick.
- Patrick William Riordan, (1841-1914) Archbishop of San Francisco.
- Lemuel John Tweedie, (1849-1917) 8th Premier of the Province of New Brunswick (1900-1907), Lieutenant-Governor of New Brunswick (1908-1912).
- Kevin Vickers, (1956- ) Sergeant-at-Arms of the House of Commons of Canada (2006-2015), Canadian Ambassador to Ireland (2015-2019).
