= Newcastle, New Brunswick =

Coordinates: 46.983°N 65.567°W

Newcastle is an urban neighbourhood in the city of Miramichi, New Brunswick, Canada.

Prior to municipal amalgamation in 1995, it was an incorporated town and the shire town of Northumberland County.

Situated on the north bank of the Miramichi River, the former town is sometimes referred to as Miramichi West.

Being a former shire town, Newcastle is the location of several government offices and the county court house. It was an important transportation centre as it was located at the head of navigation on the Miramichi River and had wharves for the export of lumber and other forest products. During the mid-1870s the Intercolonial Railway was built through the town, placing it on the mainline between Halifax and Montreal. The town's most prosperous days are considered to be the years prior to World War I. It later reached a peak population of about 6,500.

Communities amalgamated in 1995 to form the City of Miramichi, New Brunswick

== History ==
Federal census population history of Newcastle
Year	Pop.	±%
1901	2,507	—
1911	2,945	+17.5%
1921	3,507	+19.1%
1931	3,383	−3.5%
1941	3,781	+11.8%
1951	4,248	+12.4%
1956	4,670	+9.9%
1961	5,236	+12.1%
1966	5,911	+12.9%
1971	6,460	+9.3%
1976	6,423	−0.6%
1981	6,284	−2.2%
1986	5,804	−7.6%
1991	5,711	−1.6%
Source: Statistics Canada

Newcastle was first settled by Scottish settlers, led by William Davidson (lumberman) in the late 18th century, and was originally called Miramichi. Early settlers changed the name due to pronunciation and spelling troubles.

Throughout its history, the town's economy was largely based on the forest industry. A shipbuilding industry developed in the area during the late 18th century, largely to facilitate overseas lumber exports, including masts for the British Navy. The 1825 Miramichi fire, the advent of steel-hulled ships, and perhaps the overcutting of White Pine, contributed to a long-term decline in the town's economy. Pulp and paper production eventually replaced lumber exports as the mainstay of the town's economy. Newcastle remained the industrial heart of the Miramichi valley, its large pulp and paper mill employing hundreds.

While many of the early settlers were employed in the forest industry, others participated in the salmon fishery. As transportation improved and the commercial fishery waned, a valuable sports fishery developed, attracting "sports" initially from adjacent New England, and subsequently from all parts of the world.

The 1952 discovery of base metal deposits and the development of Heath Steele Mines, 60 km northwest of Newcastle, allowed the economy to diversify and strengthen through the 1960s. The mine closed in 1999 as metal prices declined and the ore bodies were depleted.

== Notable people ==
The famous British newspaper owner and Minister of Aircraft Production during World War II, Max Aitken (Lord Beaverbrook), moved to Newcastle at an early age and considered it home. A noted philanthropist, Lord Beaverbrook, contributed much to his home town and province. He established the Old Manse Library in his boyhood residence, built the town hall, and established a park (the historic Town Square) for the community. The picturesque park includes the town's war cenotaph, a stone fountain (with water supplied by an artesian well), an Italian stone gazebo and other monuments of local historic importance such as shipbuilding and folk music. The park was once well known for its graceful and elegant stand of elm trees, since stricken by the deadly Dutch elm disease. A bust of Beaverbrook, containing his ashes, stands in the square.

Newcastle is also the hometown of David Adams Richards, one of Canada's pre-eminent authors. He has been recognised via many awards, including two Governor General's Awards.
