= Bache McEvers =

American commission merchant, shipper and insurer

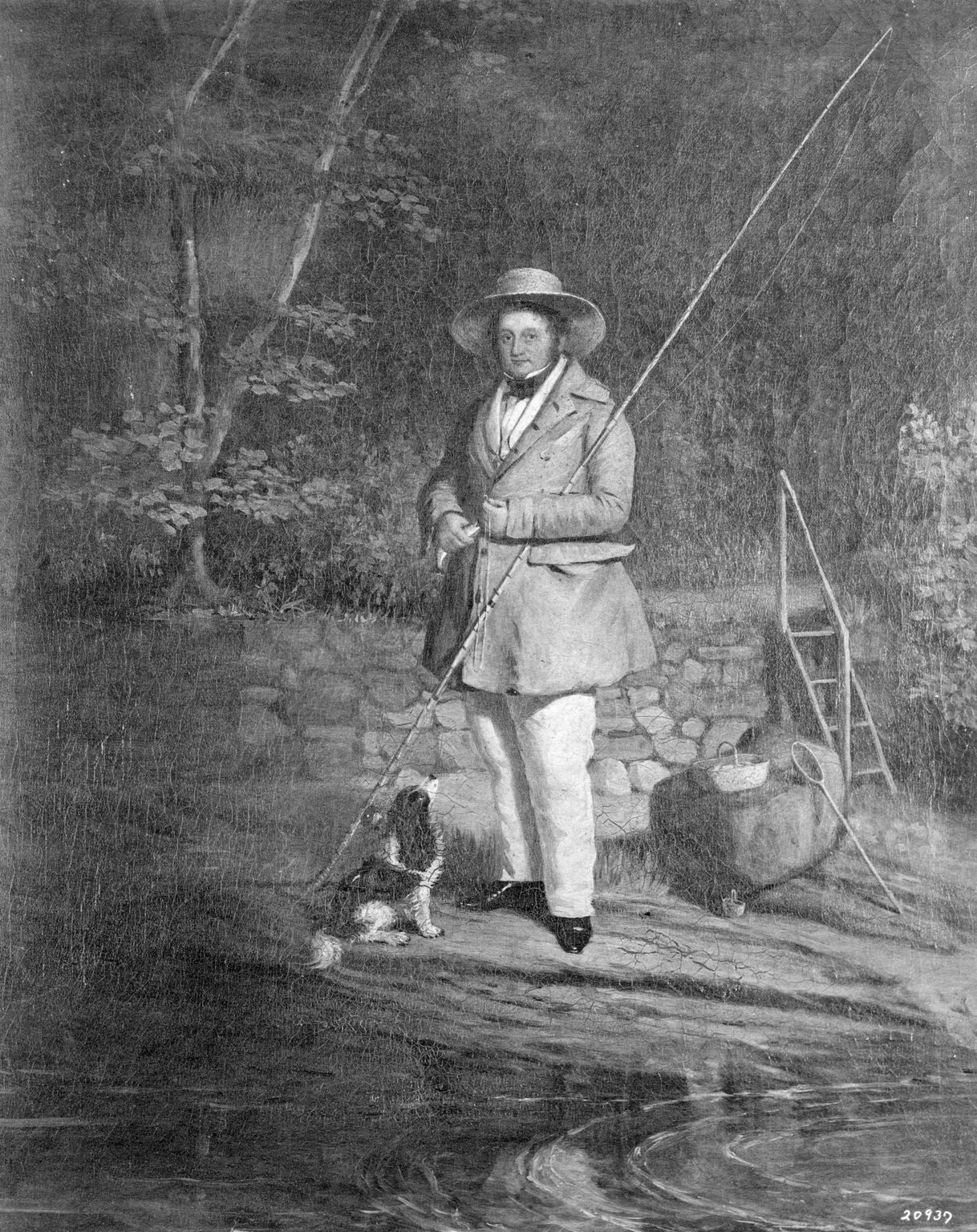
- Children: Mary McEvers

Bache McEvers (/ˈbiːtʃ/ BEECH; October 11, 1798 – July 15, 1851) was an American commission merchant, shipper, and insurer.

== Early life ==
McEvers was born on October 11, 1798. He was a son of merchant Charles McEvers (1764–1841) and, his first wife, Mary McEvers (née Bache; b. 1766). He had two siblings, an older sister, Sarah Barclay McEvers (the wife of their cousin, Robert Montgomery Livingston, a grandson of Judge Robert Livingston) and an older brother, Charles McEvers III, who died unmarried in 1843. After his mother's death, his father remarried to Margaret Cooper, a daughter of Dr. Ananias Cooper.

His maternal grandparents were Curaçao born Ann Dorothy Bache (née Barclay) and Theophylact Bache, a pro-British merchant. His grandfather was the older brother of Settle, Yorkshire born and Philadelphia-based Richard Bache, the United States Postmaster General who married Sarah Franklin (only daughter of Benjamin Franklin and Deborah Read). His paternal grandfather was merchant Charles McEvers. Two of his aunts married into the Livingston family, Mary McEvers (first wife of U.S. Secretary of State and Minister to France Edward Livingston) and Eliza McEvers (wife of merchant John R. Livingston).

== Career ==
McEvers was a prominent New York "commission merchant, shipper, and insurer who sold Louisiana cotton and sugar." He also served as president of the New-York Insurance Company and assistant of the American Insurance Company of New-York in 1834. He hired Arthur Leary to join his counting house as a clerk. Within a few years, Leary became a partner in the business and upon McEvers death in 1851, he formed a partnership with McEvers's son-in-law, Sir Edward Cunard. The partnership later ended and Leary "assumed full charge of the shipping business." Leary's sister, Annie, was made a Papal Countess by Pope Leo XIII.

== Personal life ==
Coat of Arms of Bache McEvers

On October 15, 1825, McEvers was married to Jane Erin Emmet (1802–1890), the daughter of Irish patriot and immigrant Thomas Addis Emmet, who was living in the United States by 1804 (and became New York State Attorney General in 1812). Together, they were the parents of three children:

- Jeanette Emmet McEvers (1826–1884), who married Samuel Haight Whitlock in 1850.
- Mary Bache McEvers (1828–1866), who married Sir Edward Cunard, 2nd Baronet, son of Sir Samuel Cunard, 1st Baronet (founder of the Cunard Line), in 1849.
- Addis Emmet McEvers (1835–1836), who died in infancy.

McEvers died on July 15, 1851, in Paris. He was buried in Trinity Church Cemetery in Manhattan.

=== Descendants ===
Through his daughter Mary, he was a grandfather of Sir Bache Edward Cunard, 3rd Baronet (1851–1925), who married the American heiress Maud Alice Burke, and Sir Gordon Cunard, 4th Baronet who married Edith Mary Howard (a daughter of Col. John Stanley Howard).
