= Cunard (surname) =

Cunard is a surname. Notable people with the surname include:

- Abraham Cunard (1756–1824), Canadian carpenter, merchant, and ship owner
- Grace Cunard (1893–1967), American silent film actress
- Joseph Cunard (1799–1865), Canadian merchant, shipbuilder and politician
- Maud Cunard (1872–1948), American-born London hostess
- Mina Cunard (1894–1978), American actress
- Nancy Cunard (1896–1965), English writer, editor, and publisher
- Samuel Cunard (1787–1865), British shipping magnate

== See also ==
- Joseph Cunard Barberie, Canadian politician
