= Arthur Leary =

American merchant and clubman

- Born: 1830; New York City, U.S.
- Died: February 22, 1893 (aged 62–63); New York City, U.S.
- Occupation: Merchant
- Relatives: Countess Annie Leary (sister)

Arthur Leary (1830 – February 22, 1893) was an American merchant and clubman who was prominent in New York society during the Gilded Age.

== Early life ==
Leary was born in 1830 in New York City. He was the eldest child born to Catharine Leary (1803–1879) and James Leary (1792–1862), a hatter who was a childhood friend of William Backhouse Astor Sr. He had two brothers, Daniel and George, and a sister, Annie. His father James bought many beaver pelts from William's father, John Jacob Astor, and operated a hat shop, that made him a fortune, in the basement of the original Astor House Hotel across from New York City Hall.

His maternal ancestors were Dutch immigrants and his paternal grandfather came from Ireland to the United States while he was a boy.

== Career ==
Leary started his career in the counting house of Bache McEvers, a prominent shipping merchant who was president of the New-York Insurance Company and a brother-in-law of Minister Edward Livingston. In a few years, Leary became a partner in the business and upon McEvers death in 1851, he formed a partnership with Sir Edward Cunard (the son of Sir Samuel Cunard, founder of the Cunard Line, and the husband of McEvers' daughter Mary). The partnership ended and Leary "assumed full charge of the shipping business."

Before the outbreak of the U.S. Civil War, Leary owned one of the largest lines of merchant sailing vessels in the United States, which made him and his brothers a fortune.

He was also a director of the Union Club, the Emigrant Savings Bank, the Illinois Central Railroad, (Note: The Illinois Central Railroad, of which Stuyvesant Fish was president, elected John Jacob Astor IV to replace Leary upon his death in 1893.) the Pacific Mail Steamship Company, the Park National Bank (of which he was vice-president), the New York Natural Gaslight Company (of which he was president), and the New York Mutual Life Insurance Company.

=== Society life ===
In February 1892, Leary was included in Ward McAllister's "Four Hundred", purported to be an index of New York's best families, published in The New York Times. Conveniently, 400 was the number of people that could fit into Mrs. Astor's ballroom. Reportedly, it was the Leary's friendship with the Astors that led to Arthur being the only Catholic included on Mrs. Astor's list of "The 400". Leart was known as a "Beau Brummell in society when the fashionable world centered about Washington Square," and was one of McAllister's original Patriarchs.

== Personal life ==
Leary was a lifelong bachelor who had his sister, Annie, accompany him to society functions in New York City as well as Newport, Rhode Island (he occupied the Paul cottage). He died of pneumonia at his "quaint home" at 90 Fifth Avenue on February 22, 1893. His funeral was held at St. Patrick's Cathedral and he was buried at the churchyard of St. Patrick's Old Cathedral. His pallbearers were led by Elbridge T. Gerry and Ward McAllister and following were the most prominent men in New York, including Edward Cooper, Lispenard Stewart, Abram S. Hewitt, John Jacob Astor, Chauncey Depew, Stuyvesant Fish, James P. Kernochan, Cornelius Vanderbilt, James J. Van Alen, William Watts Sherman, and George Peabody Wetmore.

After his death, his sister Annie was the executrix of his estate, and inherited his fortune as well as his social prominence, using his wealth to become a philanthropist (mostly to Catholic causes) and earning her the title of Papal Countess from Pope Leo XIII, the first for an American woman.
