= Rawdon, Nova Scotia =

Former township in Nova Scotia

Rawdon is a former township in the Canadian province of Nova Scotia. The township was the eventual destination of Loyalists fleeing the Siege of Ninety Six during the American Revolutionary War. In 1861, along with the township of Douglas, Nova Scotia, the Rawdon township became part of the newly formed Municipal District of East Hants, along with neighbouring townships.

The Rawdon township area is now the site of the present-day communities of Upper Rawdon, Centre Rawdon, South Rawdon, and Rawdon Gold Mines.

== History ==
=== Rawdon township ===
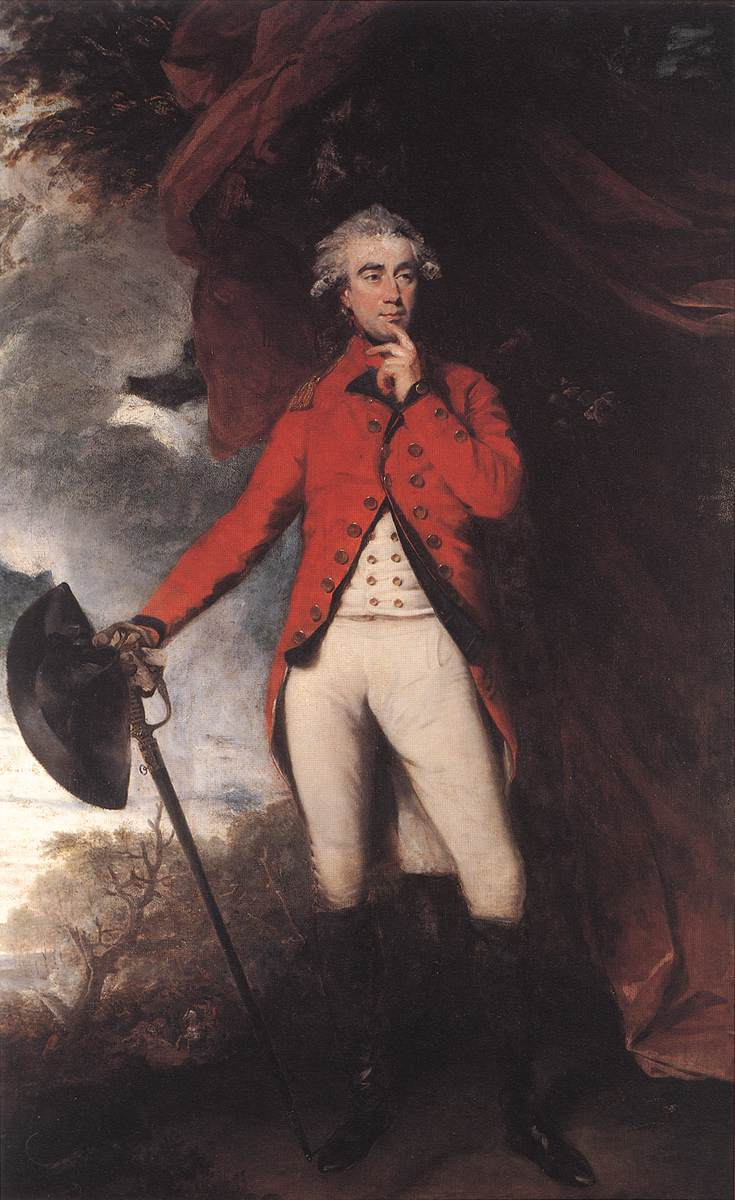
Portrait of Lord Moira (Joshua Reynolds, 1790)

The first European settlers in the Rawdon Township, Nova Scotia were United Empire Loyalists who had to flee their homes in Ninety Six, South Carolina. They first went east, taking refuge behind British lines in Charleston. About 501 Rawdon loyalists, as well as members of the 2nd American Regiment, were relocated from South Carolina to Nova Scotia in 1782 after the American Revolution.

They named their community after Francis Rawdon-Hastings, 1st Marquess of Hastings or "Lord Rawdon", who had rescued them from the 1781 Siege of Ninety-Six. The British had garrisoned a fort in this settlement because of its strategic location in western South Carolina, and as support for the many Loyalists in the area, most Scots-Irish immigrants. Stationed in Charleston after its fall, Lord Rawdon and his regiment, the Volunteers of Ireland (also known as The 2nd American Regiment), rescued the Rawdon Loyalists, who were severely outnumbered by about 1500 American Patriots. One of the most prominent Loyalists to survive the siege and settle in Rawdon was Captain John Bond, who was then part of the militia.

Some of the troops who assisted Lord Rawdon in the Siege of Ninety-Six were from the 84th Regiment of Foot (Royal Highland Emigrants), as well as the 2nd American Regiment. After the American Revolution, many of the troops of the 84th Regiment and 2nd American Regiment settled in the neighbouring Township of Douglas (i.e., Kennetcook, Nova Scotia and the surrounding area). (The 1st and 2nd Battalions of De Lancey's Brigade fought successfully from within the fort until the siege was lifted by Rawdon. The soldiers of the De Lancey's Brigade settled Woodstock, New Brunswick.)

Abraham Cunard, the Loyalist merchant and father of shipping magnate Samuel Cunard, retired to the Cunards' country home in Rawdon. He is buried at the St. Paul's graveyard in Centre Rawdon.

In 1861, Rawdon Township became part of the newly formed Municipal District of East Hants, along with neighbouring townships.

=== Upper Rawdon ===
Upper Rawdon was once known for the "Rawdon Picnic", a church fundraiser that happened on Canada Day (Known as "Dominion Day" at the time). The picnics included baby parades, beauty contests, tug of war contests, carnival rides, church suppers and square dancing. The last Rawdon Picnic was held in 1975.

=== Centre Rawdon ===
Abraham Cunard, the Loyalist merchant and father of shipping magnate Samuel Cunard, retired to the Cunards' country home in Rawdon. He is buried at the St. Paul's graveyard in Centre Rawdon.
