= Cunard (disambiguation) =

Cunard usually refers to Cunard Line, a shipping company founded by Samuel Cunard.

Cunard may also refer to:

- Cunard Building in Liverpool, the former headquarters of Cunard Line
- Cunard (surname)
- Cunard (coachbuilder), London-based supplier of car bodies.

== See also ==
Cunarder may mean:

- Any ship owned by the Cunard Line
- A set of boat trains which took passengers to and from ship ports.
