= Griffitts =

Griffitts is a surname. Notable people with the surname include:

- Hannah Griffitts (1727–1817), American Quaker poet and writer
- Samuel Powel Griffitts (1759–1826), American surgeon
- Thomas Griffitts (1698–1746), Mayor of Philadelphia and judge

== See also ==
- Griffiths
