= Fort Livingston, Louisiana =

- Fort Livingston
- U.S. National Register of Historic Places
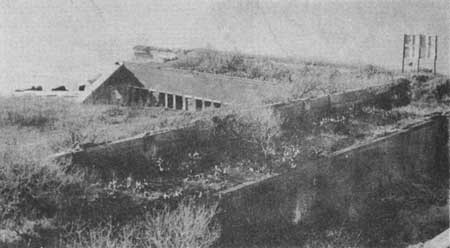
- Fort Livingston's remaining walls

- Location within Louisiana Location within the United States
- Location: Western end of Grand Terre Island, Jefferson Parish, Louisiana, USA
- Nearest city: Grand Isle, Louisiana
- Coordinates: 29°16′23″N 89°56′43″W
- Area: 5 acres (2.0 ha)
- Built: 1841
- Architects: Lieut. H. G. Wright; Col. Joseph Gilbert Totten
- NRHP reference No.: 74000925
- Added to NRHP: August 30, 1974

Fort Livingston was a 19th-century coastal defense fort located on Grand Terre Island in Jefferson Parish, Louisiana. The fort was named after Edward Livingston who had held positions as Mayor of New York City, U.S. Senator from Louisiana, and U.S. Secretary of State under President Andrew Jackson. The structure was listed on the National Register of Historic Places on August 30, 1974. Original plans for the fort were prepared by Lieutenant H. G. Wright. These plans called for the fortress to be a trapeziform stronghold surrounded by a wet ditch and by outworks on the land side. The walls were constructed of cemented shell, faced with brick, and trimmed with granite.

Fort Livingston is one of the largest coastal forts in Louisiana, and is the only fort on the Gulf of Mexico in the state. It is a classic example of American coastal forts of the first half of the 19th century. Today it is in ruins.

== History ==
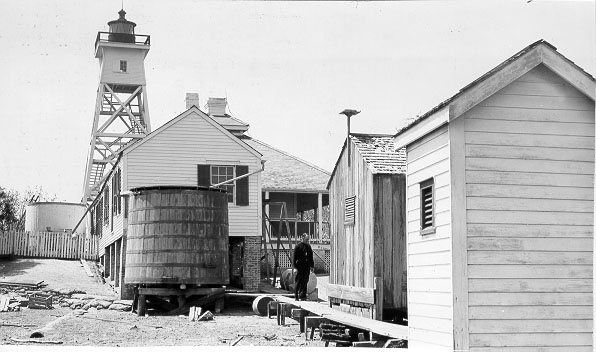
The second Barataria Bay Lighthouse adjacent to Fort Livingston, shown here, was completed in 1903.

In the early 18th century, Grand Terre Island was the home to pirates under the command of Captain Jean Lafitte. These pirates were forced to leave the island in 1814 so the U.S. government could build a coastal defense fort. This fort was also designed to control the entrance to Barataria Pass, and thereby guard New Orleans against naval attacks from the south of the city. Grand Terre Island was later owned by Jean Baptiste Moussier and used as a sugar plantation from 1821 until his death in 1831. The U.S. Government bought a tract of land, where the fort now stands, from Moussier's creditor Etienne De Gruy on the west end of Grand Terre Island. Construction at the site began in 1834, but was suspended in July 1834. Construction resumed in 1840, and construction on the fort itself began in 1841 under the direction of Major P.G.T. Beauregard. A lighthouse was added near the fort in 1856. Construction of the fort was halted with the start of the Civil War, and was never resumed. The fort was never fully completed. The fort was briefly occupied by Confederate forces during the American Civil War, but never saw combat. It was used by the Confederates to protect blockade runners coming into and out of Barataria Pass while en route to New Orleans The Confederate garrison of Fort Livingston was under the command of General Lovell. The garrison consisted of four companies, totaling 300 men. The fort was equipped with 15 guns, including a 32-pounder, an 8-inch columbiad, seven 24-pounders, four 12-pounders, and two howitzers. Confederate forces abandoned the fort after the fall of New Orleans. Following the Civil War, the fort was occupied by a single Ordnance Sergeant, beginning in 1866. The fort was permanently abandoned after a hurricane destroyed most of the structure in 1872. Most of the guns were removed in 1889. The fort's last Ordnance Sergeant removed all of the fort's remaining ammunition on February 16, 1889 A commercial shrimp cannery which produced the first canning of shrimp was opened adjacent to the fort in 1867. In 1923, the U.S. Government gave control of the fort and the island to the State of Louisiana.

== Present day ==
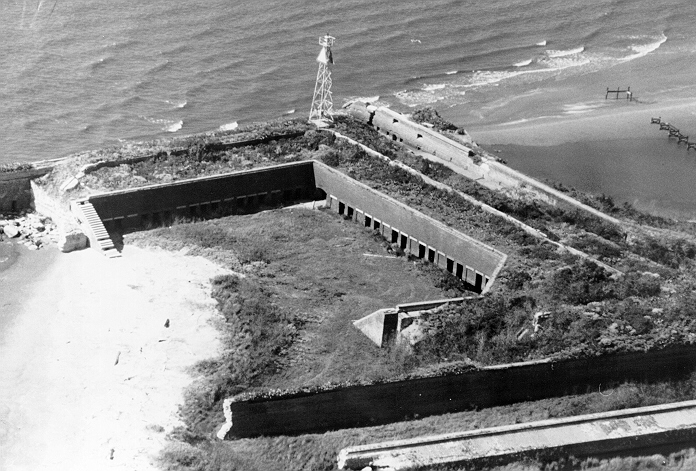
Aerial view of Fort Livingston ruins, 1995

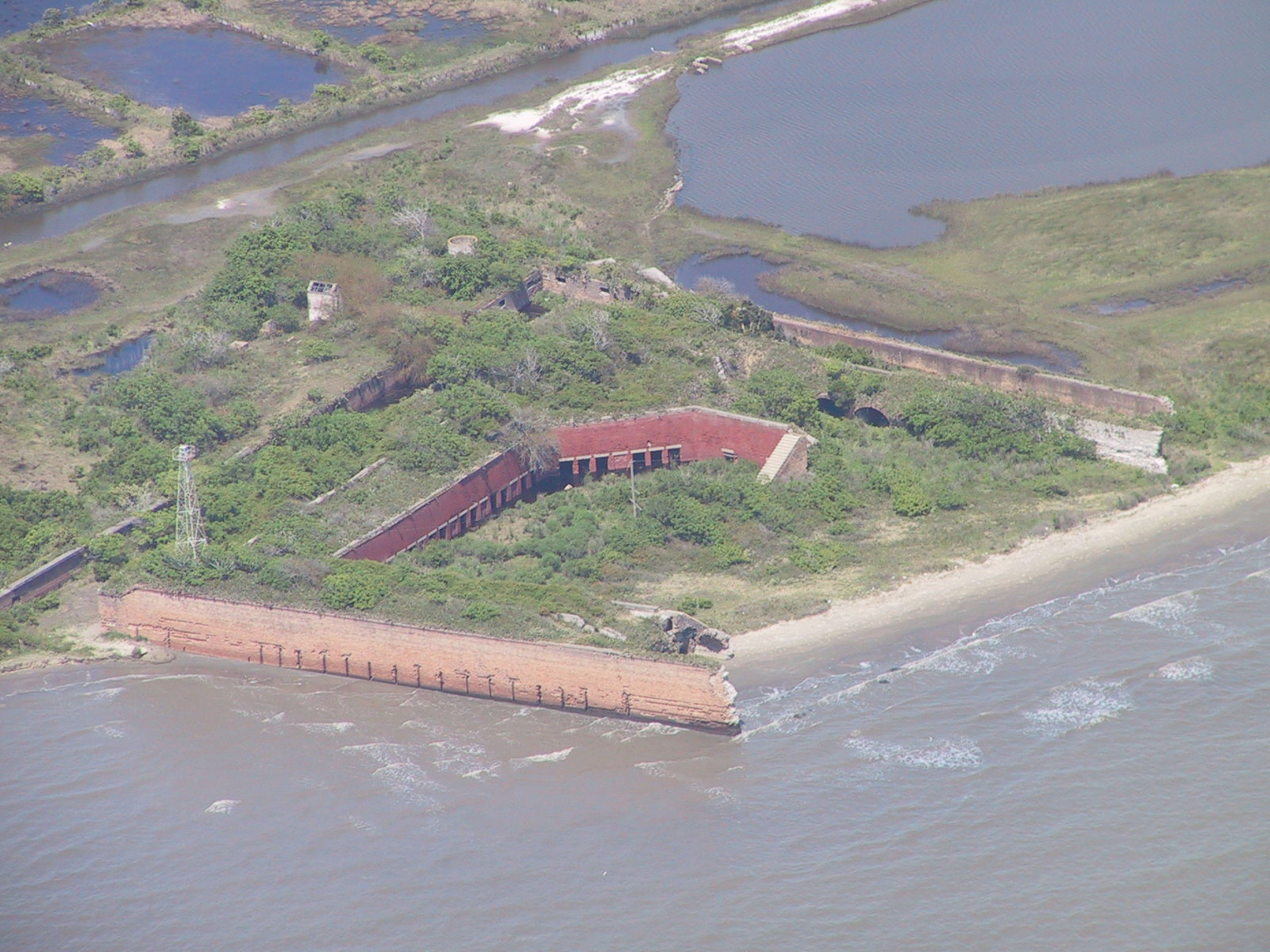
Aerial view of Fort Livingston ruins, 2002

In 1955, Grand Terre was designated as a state Wildlife and Fisheries reservation. In 1979, the Louisiana state legislature created the Fort Livingston State Commemorative Area. The remains of the fort are somewhat of a tourist attraction, although it is only accessible by boat and is closely monitored by the U.S. Coast Guard. The fort is located directly east across Barataria Bay from the Coast Guard Station on Grand Isle, Louisiana. Grand Terre Island was home to the Louisiana Department of Wildlife and Fisheries' Marine Laboratory until its destruction by Hurricane Gustav in 2008. The fort itself is also part of a wave-protection project being conducted by the Louisiana Department of Natural Resources. The project consists of a rock dike built to conserve the Gulf shoreline of West Grand Terre Island and protect Fort Livingston. As a result of tropical storm systems in 2002, the erosion rates along West Grand Terre Island greatly accelerated, requiring some type of protective barrier to be built.

== See also ==
- National Register of Historic Places listings in Jefferson Parish, Louisiana
