= Jean Baptiste Moussier =

American slave trader

Jean Baptiste Moussier (died 1831) was an American merchant and slave trader from New Orleans, Louisiana. A French Louisianian, in the 1810s he became involved in the coastal slave trade, moving enslaved persons from the Chesapeake to Louisiana. A diversified entrepreneur, Moussier later pursued real estate and finance, and is credited with inventing the concept of Louisiana property banking which allowed his customers to purchase enslaved persons on credit.

== Biography ==
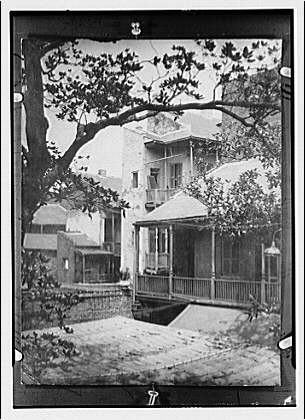
Slave quarters in New Orleans's French Quarter

Moussier was a Francophone resident of New Orleans. A merchant by trade, he first sold cotton and sugar from other French Louisianans and Creoles to buyers elsewhere in the United States and in Europe. Based in New Orleans' French Quarter, Moussier conducted his business in the neighborhood of today's Burgundy and Dumaine streets. In 1809 a letter written in French and attributed to Moussier was sent to Thomas Jefferson describing a shipment of books and artworks from the continent to the new United States.

=== Slave trader ===
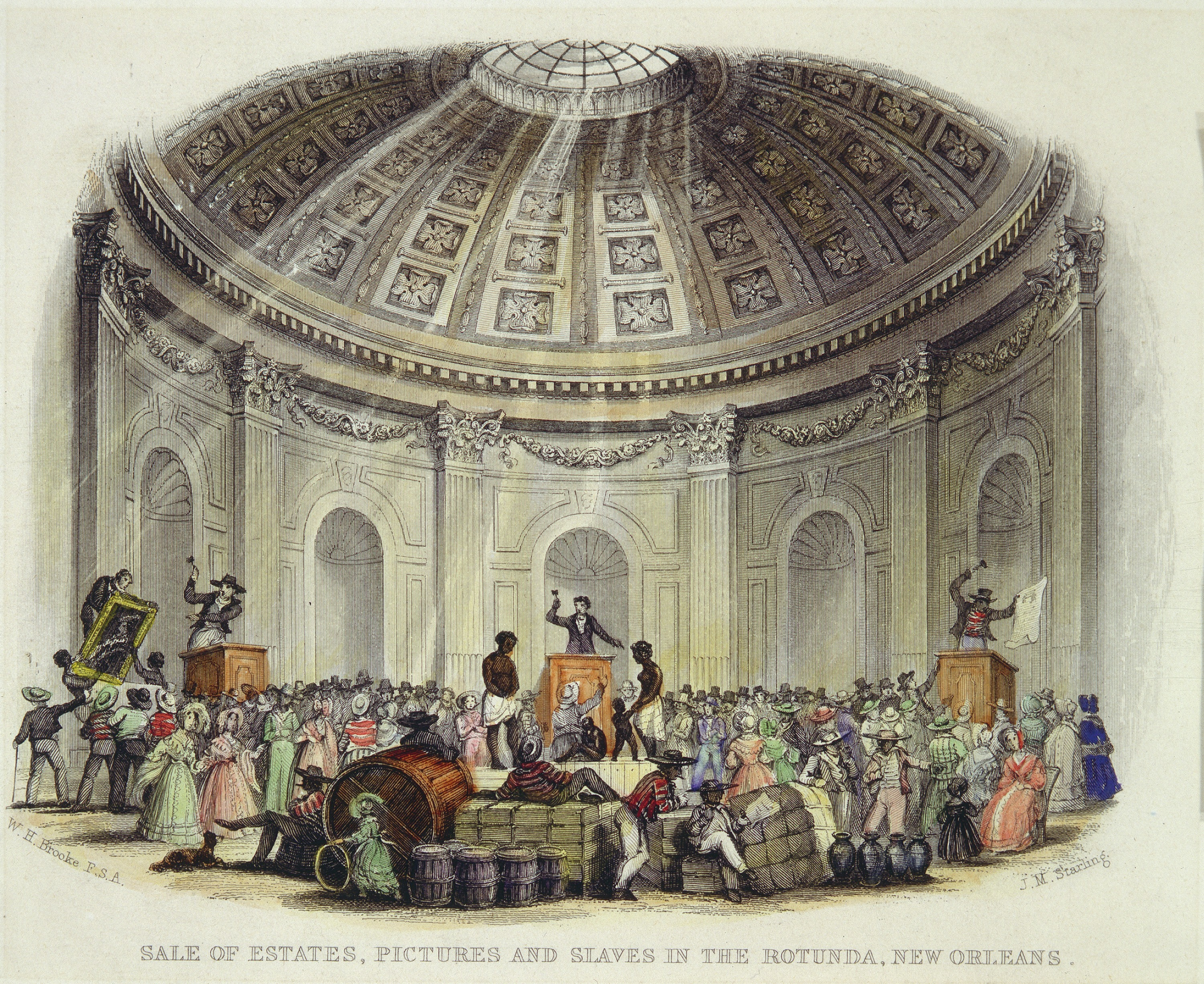
"Sale of Estates, Pictures and Slaves in the Rotunda at New Orleans" by William Henry Brooke from The Slave States of America (1842) by James Silk Buckingham

In the 1810s, Moussier looked to diversify his trading activities through the coastwise slave trade, which more insulated from price volatility as compared to other goods. New Orleans throughout the 1800s was one of the biggest markets for the domestic slave trade in the United States. He first travelled to Maryland and Virginia to purchase slaves to send south as an individual. An ambitious entrepreneur, he financed his own journeys, managed his own financing and understood the needs of his customers well, allowing him to take strategic risks. He would later build connections with the Tabb family of Norfolk, Virginia, who were known primarily as traders of cotton and tobacco. The Tabbs would work as an agent for Moussier in the upper South, shipping enslaved people for him south as they moved Southern goods northward.

Compared to other slave traders operating from the Chesapeake (such as Austin Woolfolk), Moussier was distinguished for his knowledge of the business environment of New Orleans and his deep network of Creole customers. Among Moussier's customers whom he sold slaves was Francis Xavier Martin, the former Louisiana attorney general.

=== Lafayette's tour ===
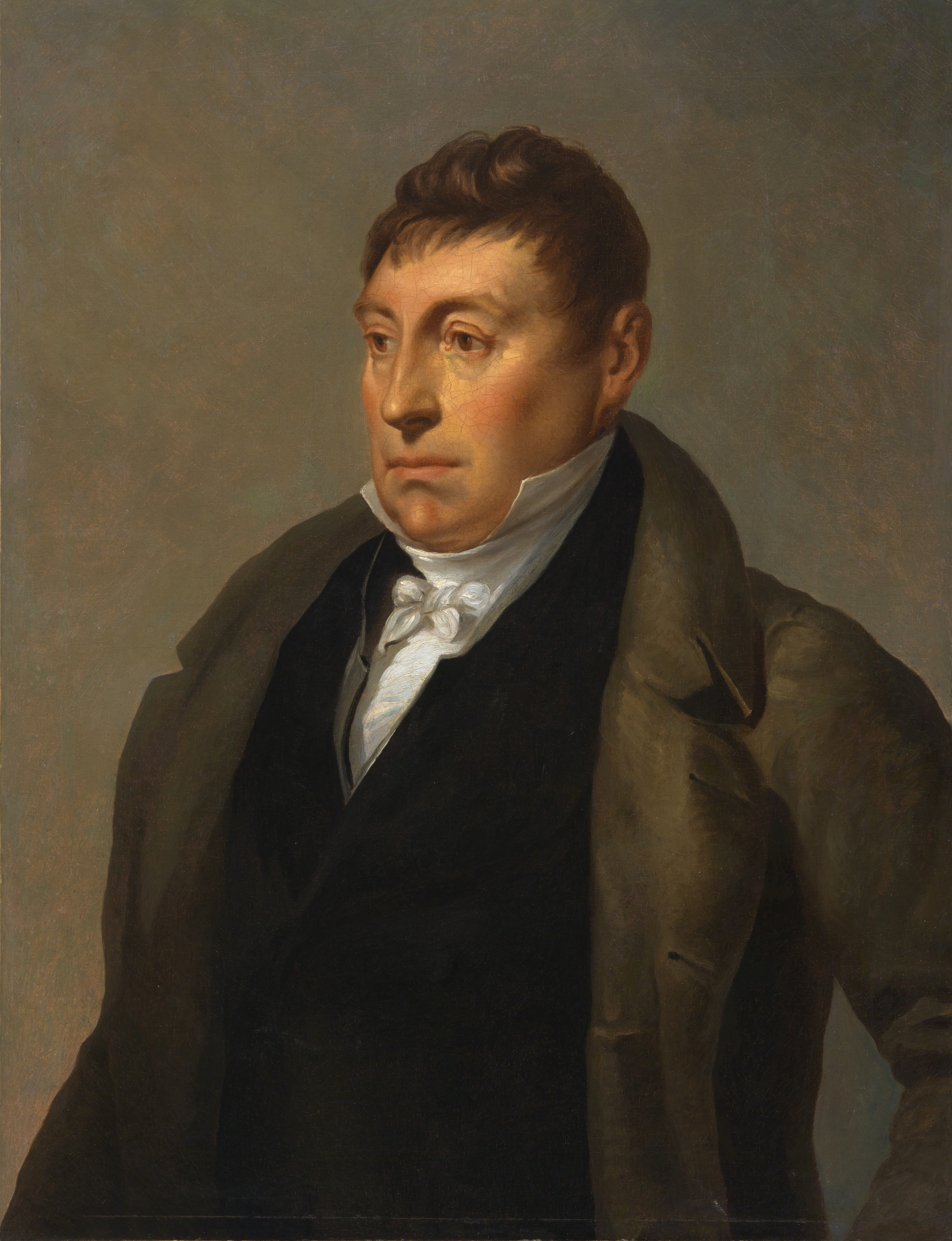
Marquis de Lafayette on his tour of the United States

Through his business connections, Moussier became known for his diplomatic skills and for building strategic alliances. In 1824, he accompanied Marquis de Lafayette on his grand tour in New York and Virginia. At the conclusion of the tour, Moussier turned his new networks into business connections, shipping enslaved persons from Norfolk to Louisiana.

=== Property banking ===
Many slave trades during Moussier's time were conducted on credit. He used this expertise to move on from slave trading into real estate and banking. He would later become known for popularizing the concept of Louisiana property banking. In 1819, as he was entering the interstate slave trade, Moussier and his New Orleans Creole business network developed the concept of the Consolidated Association, which would later be refined by Edmund Jean Forstall and others. Moussier's property banks would later attract outside investors from Britain and Europe, allowing Southern planters to access advance funding and credit to purchase slaves.

=== Personal life ===
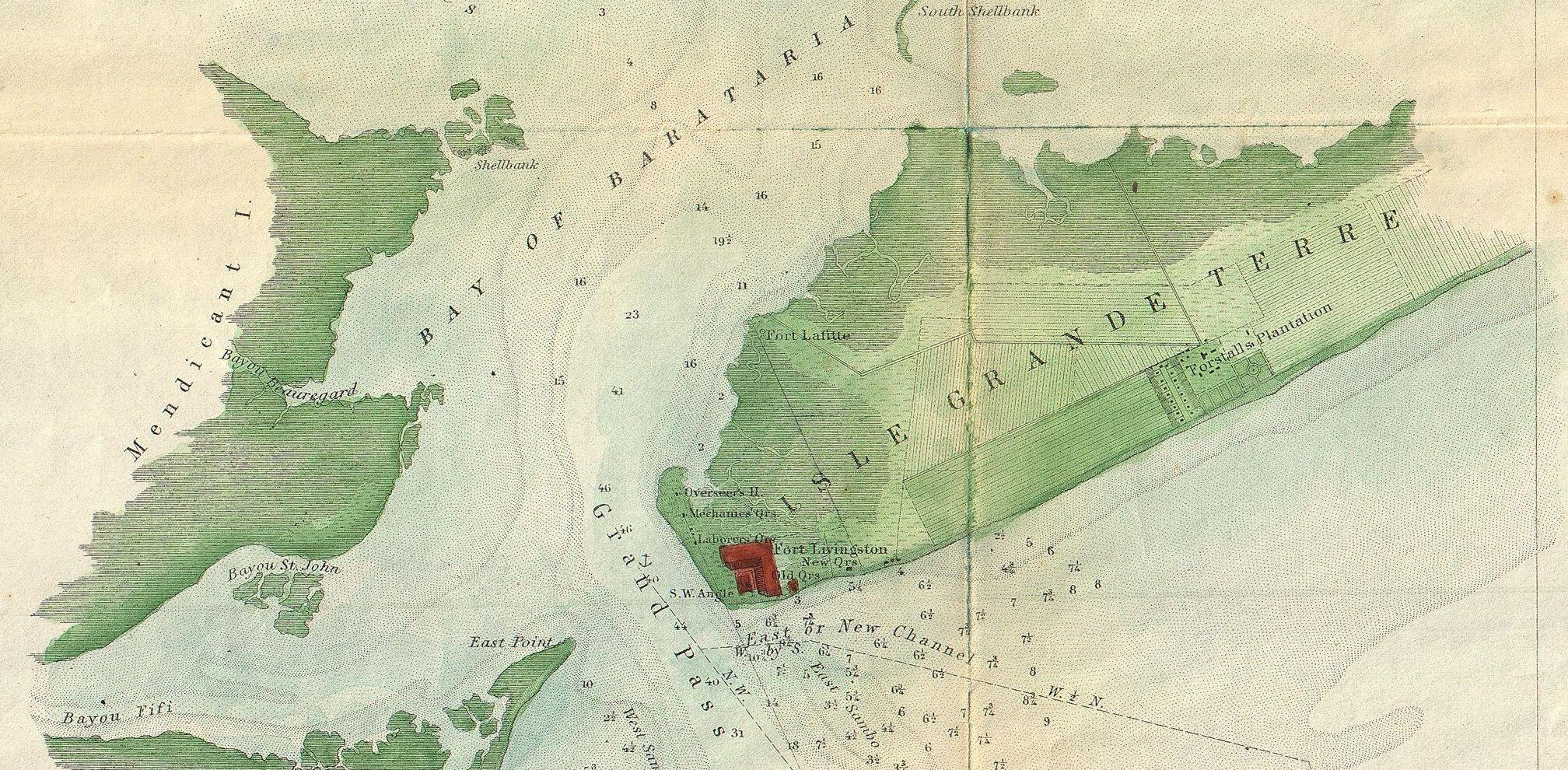
A 1853 map of Grande Terre Island. On the right of the island, "Forstall's Plantation" marks Moussier's former sugar plantation. Forstall was one of the creditors who managed the plantation after his death.

Moussier was married to Marie Elizabeth Chloé Lezongar de Lasalle and the couple had four children, Stephen Gustave Moussier, Victorie Amelie, Marie Ann Celine and Marie Emma. He owned and operated a sugar plantation, known as Grande-Terre Plantation on the Jefferson Parish barrier island of the same name in the Gulf of Mexico. He acquired one half of the island from owner Francois Mayronne in 1821, and the other half in 1823. The island, formerly the domain of pirate, privateer and slave trader Jean Lafitte, is at the mouth of Barataria Bay where it meets the Gulf.

Moussier managed the plantation until he died at home in New Orleans on June 11, 1831. Moussier died heavily in debt. When an inventory was done on Grande-Terre Plantation after his death, Moussier's 61 slaves were assessed with a total value of $21,905.00. The majority of the plantation and Moussier's slaves were purchased by the Consolidated Association of the Planters of Louisiana to clear Moussier's debts. The remainder of the plantation's slaves were purchased by the Moussier family. In 1841, the island was bought by the U.S. government to construct Fort Livingston.

Due to Moussier's respect in his community, in 1836, Citizens' Bank of New Orleans, a bank that had not existed when Moussier was alive, issued "a sum of $2500" to provide for the welfare of Moussier's daughters who by that time were living in a destitute situation.

== See also ==
- New Orleans slave market
- History of slavery in Louisiana
