= Thomas Pennant Barton =

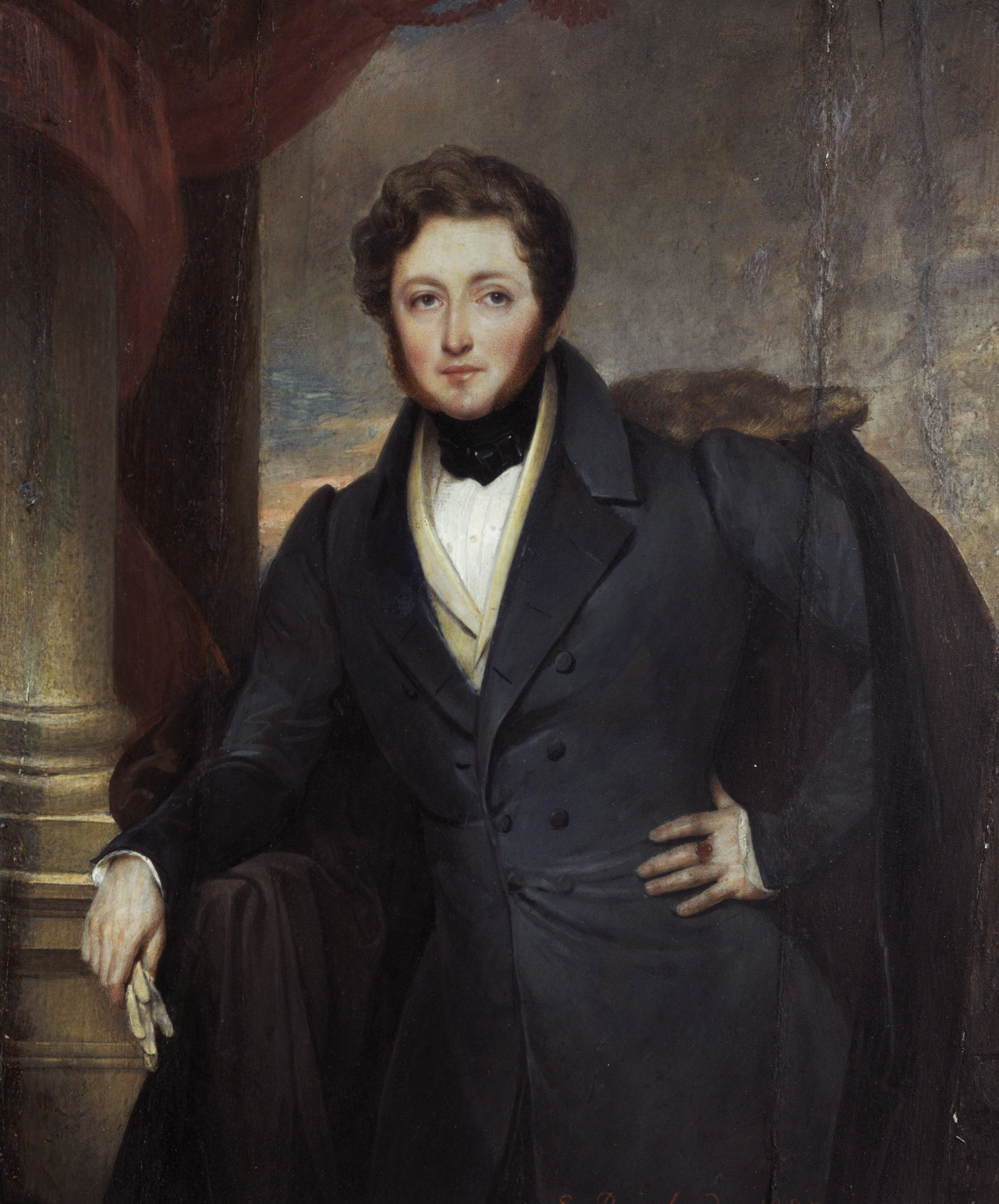
- Portrait miniature painted by Etienne Bouchardy in 1835
- Born: 1803; Philadelphia, Pennsylvania
- Died: April 5, 1869 (aged 65–66); Montgomery Place, New York
- Known for: Bibliographical activities
- Spouse: Cora Livingston (m. 1833)
- Parent(s): Benjamin Smith Barton; Mary Penington Barton

Thomas Pennant Barton (1803 – April 5, 1869) was an American diplomat and bibliophile who is primarily remembered for the collection of books by and relating to William Shakespeare and English drama that he amassed between 1834 and 1869. Four years after his death, Barton's collection was acquired by the Boston Public Library, where it has remained ever since.

Throughout much of the nineteenth century, Barton was considered by many to be the preeminent collector of the works of William Shakespeare in the United States. Because of both the breadth of his library and the profusion of rare and early editions counted among its numbers, Barton's is generally considered to be the first major collection of rare, early editions of Shakespeare and Shakespeareana assembled in America.

== Early life ==
Barton was born in Philadelphia. His father named him after the Welsh naturalist Thomas Pennant, who was a close friend. He was a son of noted physician Benjamin Smith Barton and his wife, Mary (née Penington) Barton (1771–1819).

== Career ==
Barton served as the American chargé d'affaires in France in 1835, succeeding his father-in-law, Edward Livingston, who had served as U.S. Minister to France from September 1833 to April 1835. Barton closed the legation on November 8, 1835 "because he had been recalled." He was succeeded in 1836 by Lewis Cass, who served as the next U.S. Minister to France.

=== Book collecting and personal library ===
Barton apparently began his book collecting in 1834 while attached to his father-in-law's diplomatic mission in Paris and continued, in earnest, through 1866. According to James Wynne, Barton's library consisted of as many as 16,000 volumes, though the Catalogue of the Barton Collection at the Boston Public Library suggests the collection numbered approximately 12,000 volumes at the time of its accession in 1873.

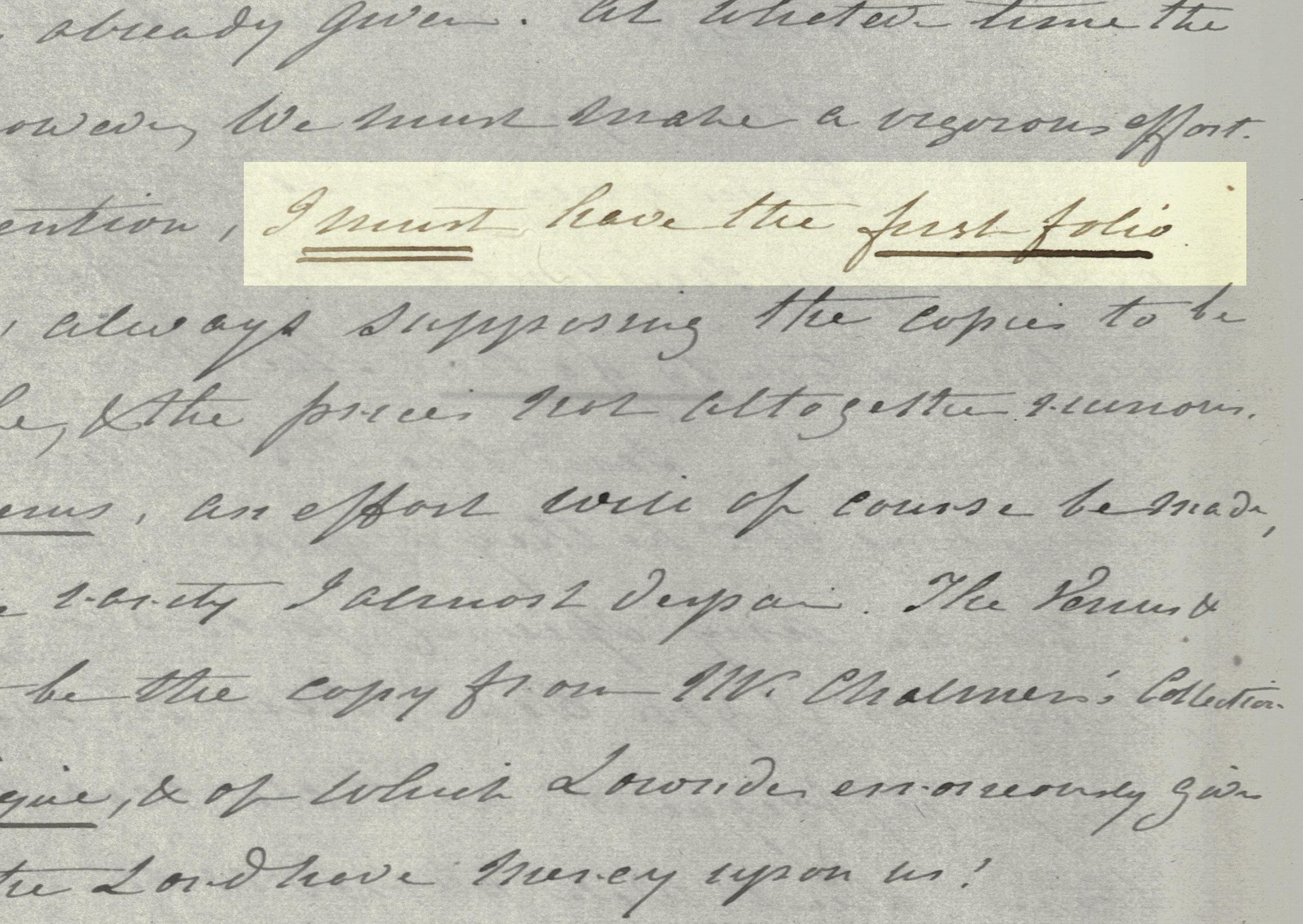
Detail of a letter from Thomas Pennant Barton to Thomas Rodd, dated May 13th, 1844.

Throughout his career as a collector, Barton worked with booksellers, binders, and stationers in both Britain, Europe, and America. He purchased from or through Obadiah Rich, Thomas Rodd, Horatio Rodd, H.G. Bohn, William Pickering, John Russell Smith, F.W. Christern, Joseph Sabin, and numerous others. Through these agents, he was an active buyer at many of the major British book auctions of the mid-nineteenth century, including the sales of Richard Heber (1834), Benjamin Heywood Bright (1845), the Statfold Hall Library sale (1856), and a number of J.O. Halliwell-Phillipps' auctions.

Barton's primary collecting interest was in the works of William Shakespeare and, in particular, in the early quarto and folio editions of his plays and poems. During his lifetime, Barton acquired many rare and early Shakespeare editions, including 45 play quartos issued before the English Restoration, nine of which were issued during Shakespeare's lifetime. Barton also acquired all four seventeenth-century folio editions (including the First Folio of 1623, two copies of the Second Folio (1632), both issues of the Third Folio (1663 and 1664), and the Fourth Folio (1685)). Among the many early Shakespearean quarto editions in the Barton collection are all nine of the Jaggard/Pavier quartos (sometimes referred to as the False Folio), as well as several early and rare anthologies and poetic miscellanies containing Shakespeare's poetry. John Alden refers to Barton as "the first American to form an extensive, purposeful collection of Shakespeariana." Indeed, his participation in the Heber sale (1834-1836) marked a watershed moment in the history of American Shakespeare collecting. During that single sale, Barton acquired, among other things, the first quarto of A Midsummer Night's Dream, the first quarto of The Merchant of Venice, and the third quarto of Hamlet (lot nos. 2012, 2014, and 2021, respectively).

Barton was also interested in English drama more generally, and the collection is particularly strong with respect to the early modern period, containing hundreds of quarto editions of English playbooks by playwrights including Christopher Marlowe, John Lyly, Thomas Kyd, Ben Jonson, Thomas Middleton, John Fletcher, and Thomas Heywood, among others. Barton also amassed substantial selections of French, Italian, Spanish, and German literature and belles-lettres. In addition, nearly 4,000 volumes in Barton's collection come from the personal library of Edward Livingston, which Barton inherited in 1836. Livingston's library consisted largely of works on jurisprudence and history.

The condition of his books was a major concern for Barton, and he sought out only the finest copies of any given editions available on the market. As a result, the breadth of his collection was limited by the availability on the market of excellent copies. In the collection of Barton's papers held at the Boston Public Library, Barton can be observed frequently turning down exceedingly rare editions of early quartos and folios based on their poor or otherwise deficient condition. Many of these copies can now be tracked to other collections.

As of 2017, the Boston Public Library is actively engaged in the conservation and digitization of Barton's Shakespeare and Shakespeareana. Digitized copies of his books are accessible through the Internet Archive.

== Personal life ==
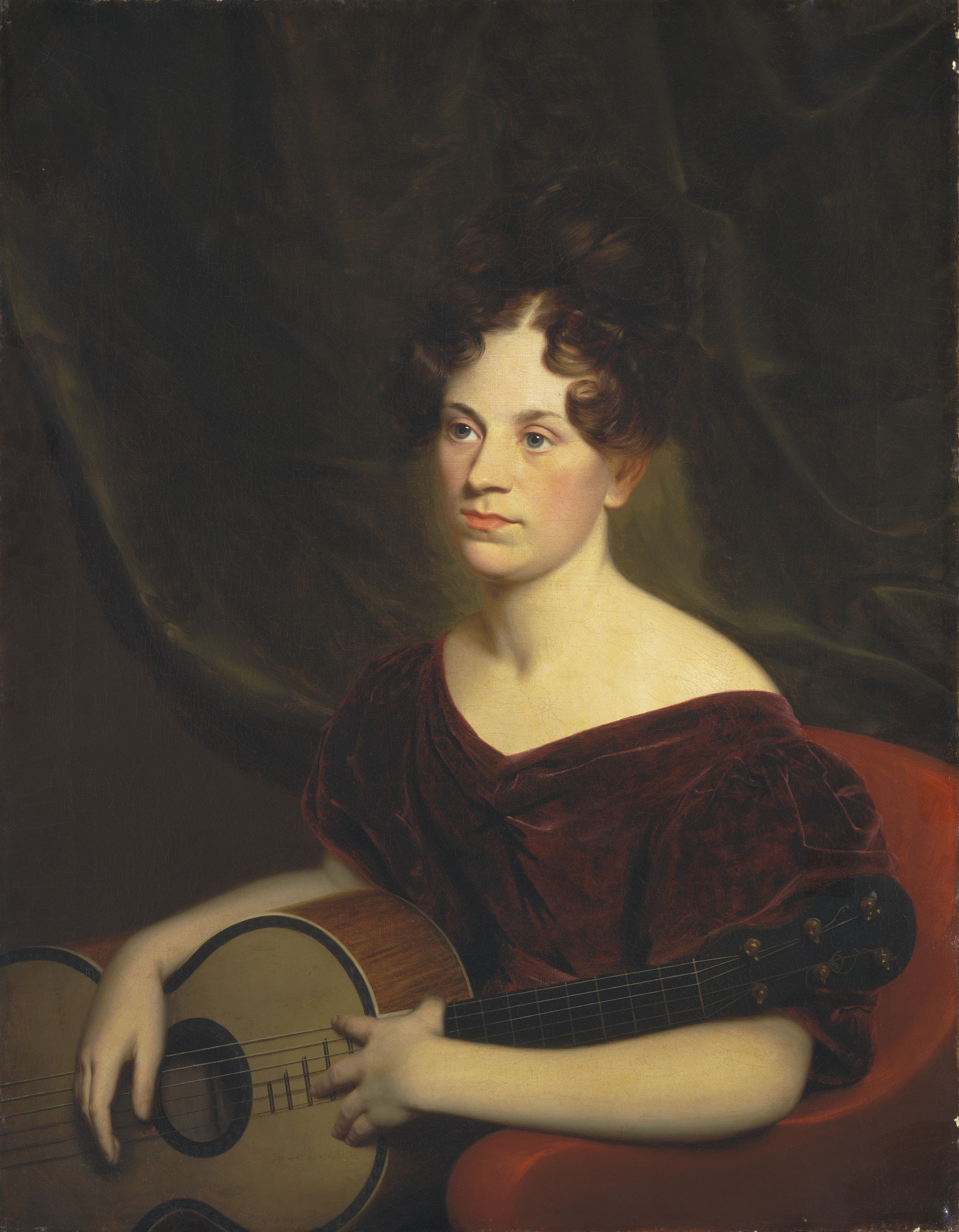
Cora Livingston, portrait by Charles Cromwell Ingham

In 1833, Thomas Pennant Barton married Coralie "Cora" Livingston (1806-1873), a member of the prestigious Livingston family. Cora was the daughter of U.S. Secretary of State Edward Livingston and Louise (née d'Avezac de Castera) Livingston (sister of Auguste Davezac). Her paternal grandparents were Judge Robert Livingston, a member of the New York Provincial Assembly and a Judge of the New York Supreme Court of Judicature, and Margaret (née Beekman) Livingston, heir to immense tracts of land in Dutchess and Ulster counties.

He died, without issue, on April 5, 1869, at Montgomery Place, the Livingston family estate near Barrytown, New York.
