= Thomas Morgan Rotch =

American physician

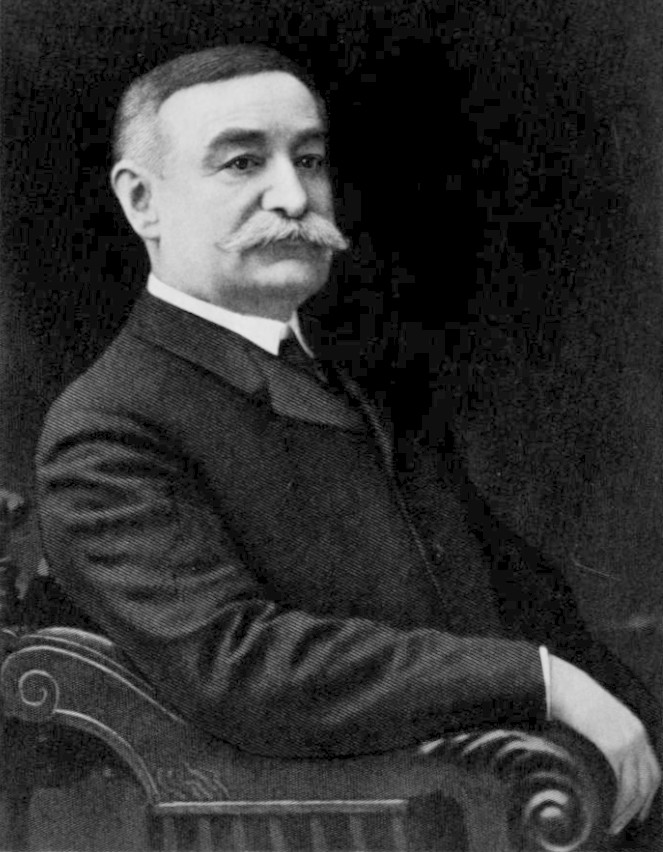
- Born: December 9, 1849; Philadelphia, Pennsylvania
- Died: March 9, 1914 (aged 64); Boston, Massachusetts
- Education: Harvard Medical School
- Occupation: Pediatrician

Signature
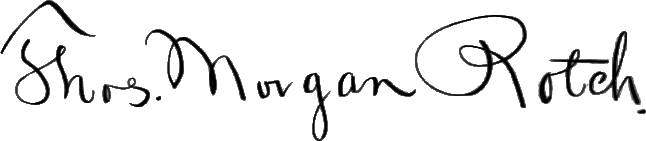

Thomas Morgan Rotch (1849–1914) was the president of the American Pediatric Society for 1890–91 and America's first full professor of pediatrics. He was the great-grandson of Samuel Powel Griffitts.

== Biography ==
Thomas Morgan Rotch was born in Philadelphia on December 9, 1849. He graduated from Harvard College in 1870, and from Harvard Medical School in 1874. He then spent two years at the Universities of Berlin, Vienna, and Heidelberg to complete his medical education before returning to Boston.

Prior to Rotch, there had been no physician in New England devoted to child health. Rotch was instrumental in creating a department of pediatrics at Harvard, and in 1893 he became the first Professor of Pediatrics in the United States. He was also involved with the founding of the Boston Children's Hospital.

Rotch invented an incubator for premature infants, which was presented to the American Pediatric Society in 1895.

He was a founding member of the American Pediatric Society and served as its president from 1890 to 1891.

He died at his home in Boston on March 9, 1914.

== Legacy ==
The Rotch sign is named after him.
