= Annie Leary =

American Papal countess, society figure and philanthropist

- Countess of the Holy Roman Church
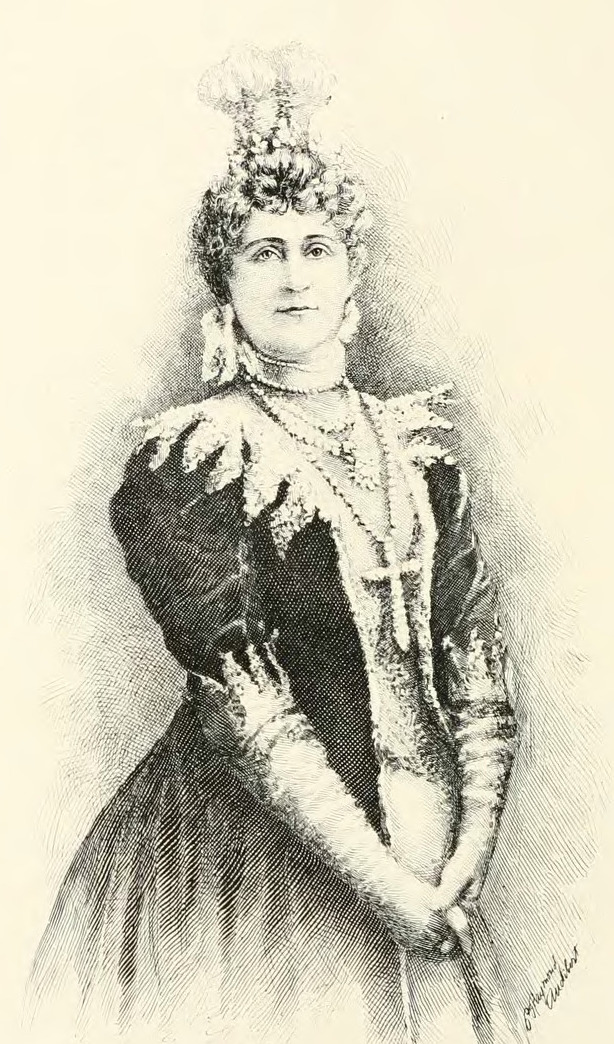
- Born: 1832; New York City, New York, U.S.
- Died: April 26, 1919 (aged 86–87); New York City, New York, U.S.
- Occupation: Philanthropist
- Relatives: Arthur Leary (brother)

Annie Leary, Countess of the Holy Roman Church (1832 – April 26, 1919) was an American Papal countess, prominent society figure, and philanthropist in late nineteenth- and early twentieth-century New York City.

== Early life ==
Annie was born in 1832 in New York City. She was the daughter of Catharine Leary (1803–1879) and James Leary (1792–1862), a hatter who was a childhood friend of William Backhouse Astor Sr. James later bought many beaver pelts from William's father, John Jacob Astor, and operated a shop in the basement of the original Astor House Hotel across from New York City Hall. She had three brothers: Arthur, Daniel and George, who made a fortune in shipping during the U.S. Civil War. Arthur was a bachelor who Annie accompanied to society functions in New York City as well as Newport, Rhode Island. It has been suggested that James's friendship with the Astors is what led to Arthur, and in turn Annie, being the only Catholics to be included on Mrs. Astor's "The 400". When Arthur died she inherited his fortune as well as his social prominence.

Her maternal ancestors were Dutch immigrants and her paternal grandfather came from Ireland to the United States while he was a boy.

== Philanthropy ==
After inheriting vast wealth, Annie Leary soon became an ardent philanthropist. Among her first projects was a predominantly Italian church in the Sullivan Street neighborhood where she taught a sewing class and increased the size of the congregation. She gave altars to a large number of churches, both in the United States and abroad. She built and outfitted several churches and brought an order of priests (the Order of the Fathers of the Blessed Sacrament) to the St. Jean Baptiste Church, and an order of sisters (the Sisters of the Order of the Reparation) to the U.S. to carry out her work. She also donated the statue of Christopher Columbus in Columbus Circle.

Among her notable bequests was $1 million for the construction of the Chapel of the Blessed Sacrament at Bellevue Hospital, the first Catholic chapel at Bellevue, which was donated in 1893 and dedicated in memory of her late brother Arthur in 1897. The Chapel was razed in 1938 in order to make way for a Bellevue administration building that encompassed a new chapel where the original stained glass panels including nine made in Munich remain today.

In 1903, Pope Leo XIII created her a Papal Countess, the first such title to have been bestowed upon a woman in the United States.

== Personal life ==
Her closest friend was the businesswoman and financier Hetty Green, who was known as "the richest woman in America" during the Gilded Age. Leary, who did not marry, died at her home, 1032 Fifth Avenue in New York City, on April 26, 1919. Her funeral was held at St. Ignatius Loyola Church on East 84th Street and Park Avenue.

=== Estate ===
In her will, she allotted $200,000 to the Archbishop of New York for the erection of a sacristy for New York City's new St. Patrick's Cathedral as well as a vault for eight (the Countess and her family) to be placed beneath the altar. It turned out however that the management of her will was delegated to a niece of hers who was not fond of the departed philanthropist and the money was never given to the aforementioned clergyman. Legal action therefore followed, and by the time the will was resolved in 1926 there was no money left to pay for the vault. Consequently, the Countess's final resting place is in the catacombs of the Old St. Patrick's Cathedral.
