= Abraham Cunard =

Nova Scotian businessman (1756–1824)

Abraham Cunard (1756 – January 10, 1824) was a United Empire Loyalist carpenter, timber merchant, and ship owner from Halifax, Nova Scotia, best known as the father of shipping magnate Samuel Cunard.

== Biography ==
Abraham Cunard was a descendant of Thones Kunders, a German Quaker who immigrated to Pennsylvania in 1683. Abraham Cunard enjoyed youthful success as a timber merchant and shipowner, but his entire fleet was confiscated by rebels in the American Revolution and Cunard came to Halifax with the Loyalist migration in 1783.

Cunard worked as a foreman carpenter with the British Army. In 1799 he was appointed master carpenter of the Royal Engineers at the Halifax garrison by Prince Edward, Duke of Kent, the commander-in-chief in British North America. Cunard held his post until he retired in 1822.

Cunard also pursued a private business career, building and buying wharves, warehouses and considerable land holdings. In July 1812, he founded the firm of A. Cunard and Sons to enter the timber and West Indian trade. Cunard acquired valuable timber holdings in Nova Scotia's Cumberland County and later in Hants County where one of his employees was Jacob Hall, father of William Hall, the first black recipient of the Victoria Cross. Cunard provided timber to the Royal Navy's Halifax Naval Yard and to export markets in Britain and the West Indies. He also owned ships and traded to the West Indies as well as acting as an agent for other shipowners.

Cunard prospered during the War of 1812: he purchased captured ships and cargoes and he supplied British forces with risky but rewarding wartime trading. One of his ships, the schooner Margaret was captured by American privateers in 1814 but recaptured and returned to Cunard.

== Legacy ==
In 1783, Abraham Cunard married Margaret Murphy (1758-1821), another Loyalist whose family had immigrated in 1773 to South Carolina from Ireland. They had nine children, two girls and seven boys. His sons, William, Samuel, Edward, Joseph, John, Thomas and Henry followed into the family firm as well as founding their own ventures. Abraham's son Joseph Cunard became a major timber merchant and politician in New Brunswick. However it was Abraham's second son Samuel Cunard who emerged as the leader in the family firm. Using his father's company as a base, Samuel Cunard launched his own shipping empire after his father's death which eventually became the famous Cunard Line.

Abraham Cunard retired in 1822 and moved to the family's country home at Rawdon, Nova Scotia, in East Hants County. His wife Margaret had died in 1821. Abraham died in 1824. He is buried with his wife at the St. Paul's Church graveyard at Rawdon.

== Bibliography ==
- Smy, William Arthur (Fall 1997). "Loyalist Cunards". Loyalist Gazette. 35 (2).
