= Joseph Cunard =

Canadian politician

Joseph Cunard (1799 – January 16, 1865) was a merchant, shipbuilder and political figure in New Brunswick. He represented Northumberland County in the Legislative Assembly of New Brunswick from 1828 to 1833.

== Biography ==
Cunard was born into a family of United Empire Loyalist German Quaker settlers in Halifax, Nova Scotia, the son, along with Samuel, Henry and John, of Abraham Cunard and Margaret Murphy. In the year of his birth, his father was named master carpenter of the Royal Engineers at the Halifax garrison.

Cunard was educated in Halifax and entered his father's firm. Around 1820, with his brothers Henry and Samuel, he opened a branch of the family timber business in Chatham, New Brunswick. The firm operated mills, wharves, a store and shipyards there. The business expanded to include operations at Shippegan, Kouchibouguac, Richibucto and Bathurst.

In 1831 the company purchased stores, houses, and other buildings at Bathurst and the next year began shipping timber. Exports of lumber from Bathurst rose from 1,300 tons in 1829 to 26,500 tons in 1833.

In 1832 Joseph Cunard was described as one of the wealthiest and most influential merchants in the province. At Chatham his firm owned several mills, including a large steam mill which began operations in 1836 and sawed 40,000 feet of lumber a day. In the same town the firm also had a brickworks, several stores, a counting house employing 30 people, and at least two shipyards.

In 1831 the firm purchased a significant quantity of real estate at Bathurst and the next year began shipping timber: exports of lumber from Bathurst rose more than 20-fold in the four years from 1829.

Cunard was also a justice of the peace and served on the board of health for Northumberland county. In 1833, he was named to the province's Legislative Council. Cunard also served on the province's Executive Council from 1838 to 1843.

He competed with the firm Gilmour, Rankin, and Company for control of timber reserves along the Miramichi River.

In November 1847, after having overextended himself financially, Cunard was forced to declare bankruptcy which put many people in the region out of work. In 1848, Cunard's assignees were able to launch from the shipyard which had formerly belonged to him in Bathurst a small brigantine. The brothers Andrew and George Smith appear to have then taken up the assets in Bathurst, and built ships there until 1868.

In 1850, Cunard left New Brunswick for good and settled at Liverpool in England where he again entered business selling ships, lumber and goods on a commission basis for merchants in the colonies. He died there in 1865 and is buried in Toxteth Park cemetery.

== Legacy ==
In April 1833, he married Mary Peters. Together they gave birth to four sons and one daughter, although it is noted that one of his sons died while quite young.

Cunard is memorialized in street names in Chatham and Bathurst, which at one time was his wharf.

=== Ship built at Chatham ===
Cunard subcontracted from 1827 to 1838 shipbuilding on the Miramichi. By 1839 he had two shipyards of his own in Chatham, where he launched at least 43 vessels including the Velocity, which was in 1846 the first steamboat constructed on the Miramichi.

=== Ships built at Bathurst ===
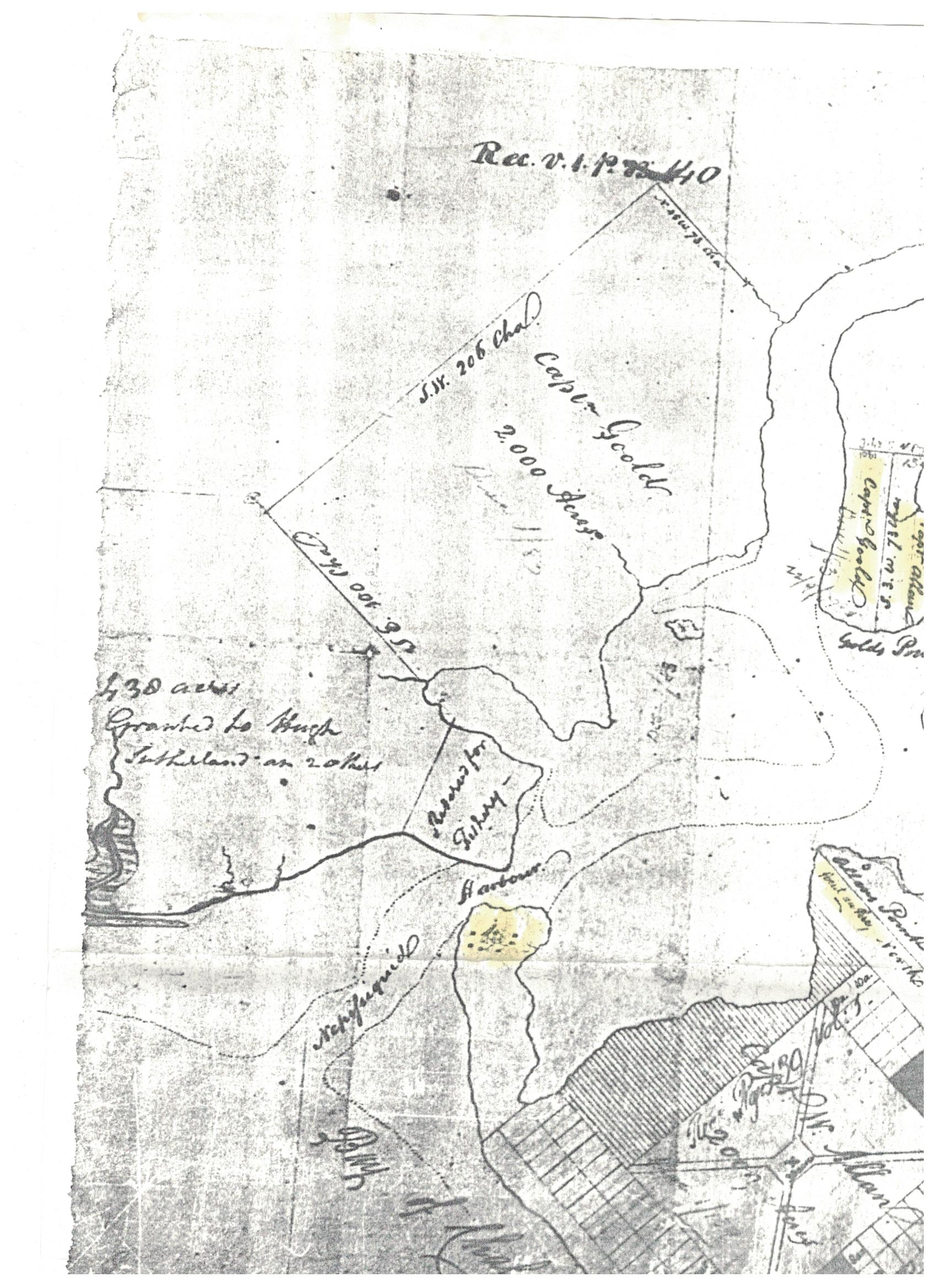
Government survey document indicating 1789 landholdings near Bathurst Harbour (formerly Nepisiguit Harbour) and Baie des Chaleurs New Brunswick. Seen at the upper centre-right is the "Capt Gould" land grant, which was obtained some time after 1828 by Cunard.

Cunard seems to have been the only shipbuilder at Bathurst from 1841 to 1847. His draughtsman was Gavin Rainnie. While Cunard purchased in the 1820s several small properties in Bathurst, it does not appear that he made Bathurst the centre of his operations until well after the great 1825 Miramichi Fire, upon which he needed a new source of timber for his ships. The Cunard shipyard was located on Main Street where the paper mill oil tanks used to be located. He purchased, amongst many others, the Gould grant of 2,000ac which covers the area between Murray Avenue and Sutherland Avenue, and as far south as the South Bathurst parish graveyard.

- 1839: Jane 300 DWT, Susan 300 DWT, Caroline 400 DWT
- 1840: Trio 194 DWT, Henry 400 DWT, Larch 344 DWT
- 1841: Acapulco 350 DWT, Bathurst 472 DWT, Durango 350 DWT, Gloucester 350 DWT, Lima 205 DWT
- 1842: Irene 321 DWT
- 1843: Larch 444 DWT
- 1845: Louisa 1043 DWT, Ouzel Galley 300 DWT
- 1846: Sobraon 256 DWT, Hydaspes 595 DWT, Pakinham 740 DWT, Sutlej 659 DWT
- 1847: Essequibo 342 DWT, London 692 DWT

=== Ships built at Richibucto ===
Cunard began operations around 1840 in Richibucto and Kouchibouguac, where he constructed at least nine vessels before the demise of his firm.
