= Samuel Powel Griffitts =

American physician

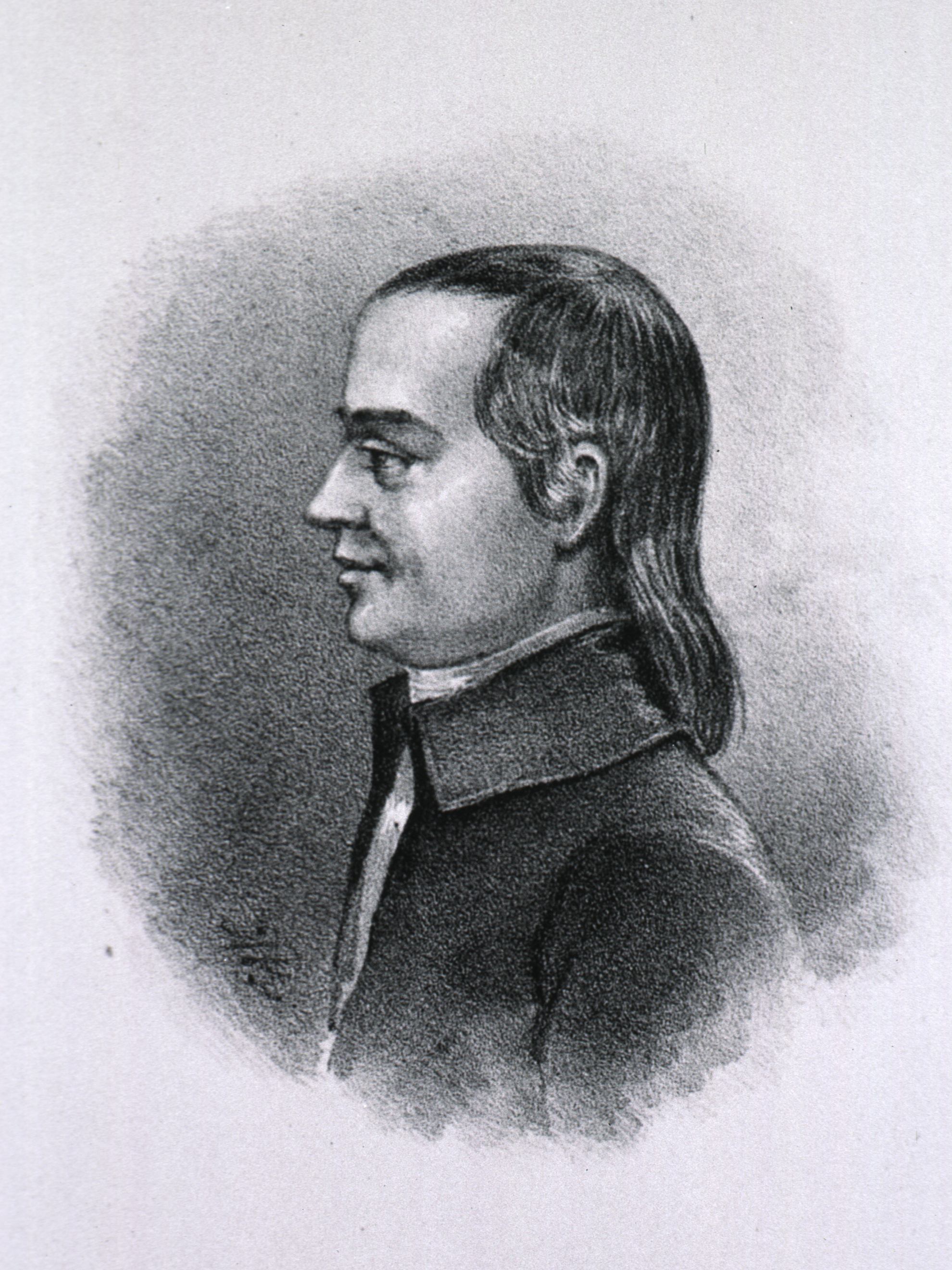
- Born: July 21, 1759; Philadelphia
- Died: May 12, 1826 (aged 66)
- Occupation: Physician
- Spouse: Mary Fishbourne
- Children: 7
- Relatives: Samuel Powel (uncle); Thomas Morgan Rotch (great-grandson)

Samuel Powel Griffitts (July 21, 1759 – May 12, 1826, sometimes also written as "Griffiths") was an American medical doctor, widely regarded as the founder, in 1786, of the Philadelphia Dispensary (a free clinic for poor people). He was an early member of the American Philosophical Society, elected in 1785.

== Life ==
Coat of Arms of Samuel Powel Griffitts

Griffitts was born into a Quaker family in Philadelphia, the third son of William and Abigail Powel Griffitts. In 1776, he entered the College of Philadelphia, where he studied medicine with Adam Kuhn, a physician and botanist who had been a pupil of Linnaeus.

His education was interrupted by the American Revolution, particularly the Philadelphia campaign. Together with his classmate Caspar Wistar, Griffitts was one of the medical volunteers who treated wounded soldiers after the nearby Battle of Germantown. After the British occupation of Philadelphia disrupted programs at the College of Philadelphia, Griffitts finished his degree at the University of the State of Pennsylvania in July 1781.

Upon completion of his medical degree in 1781, Griffitts sought training in Europe, as did many physicians of his generation. Benjamin Rush gave him a list of eighteen recommendations for medical students in Europe:

Rush recommended that .. Griffitts attend lectures on natural philosophy as well as on medical subjects, visit the hospitals, noting the prescriptions and modes of treatment, spend a few hours daily for some weeks in a chemical laboratory and apothecary's shop, and acquire a library...and spend an hour daily for three months on dancing lessons.

Griffitts went first to Paris and then to Montpellier, but transferred his studies to London as soon as hostilities ended, writing to Rush in 1783 that although London was "the Metropolis of the whole world for Practical Medicine" the French hospitals were cleaner and had better nursing arrangements. In June 1783, Griffitts moved to Edinburgh for a year, where he studied with William Cullen before returning to Philadelphia in the spring of 1784.

After returning to Philadelphia, one of his first professional actions was to work toward establishing the Philadelphia Dispensary, the first charity clinic in the United States. Although his contemporaries regarded Griffitts himself as its founder, Griffitts credited a visiting lecturer Henry Moyes with first proposing the idea of a free clinic to him and to his uncle Samuel Powel in 1785. (Powel, his mother's brother, had been Philadelphia's last colonial mayor (1775–1776) and would later be its mayor again (1789–1790).)

Funding for the Philadelphia Dispensary would come from subscriptions, while physicians were expected to volunteer their services. Soon 320 subscriptions were gathered and a building was found; the clinic first opened early in 1786. Griffitts headed the list of the dispensary's first doctors and continued to make daily visits to its patients for more than forty years. Griffitts later played a large role in creating two more Philadelphia dispensaries as the city's population continued to grow. According to his biographer Gouverneur Emerson, Griffitts "may be fairly considered as the father of the dispensaries of his native city."

He was also a member of the Humane Society and the Pennsylvania Abolitionist Society.

In 1792, he was elected Professor of Materia Medica at the University of Pennsylvania, and held this position for four years before resigning it to Benjamin Smith Barton. Griffitts continued practicing medicine and serving the community for the remainder of his life until succumbing to a sudden illness in 1826.

== Family ==
He had seven children through his marriage to Mary Fishbourne, daughter of Philadelphia Mayor William Fishbourne. His mother's brother Samuel Powel, twice mayor of Philadelphia, was also a member of the American Philosophical Society. His great grandson was Thomas Morgan Rotch.
