= Maud Cunard =

American-born English socialite (1872–1948)

Lady Cunard
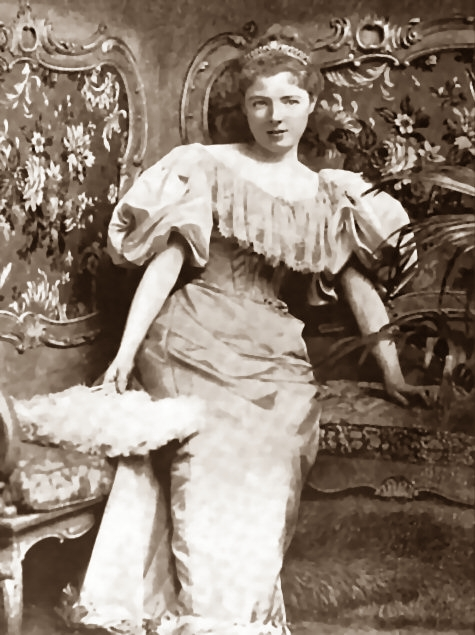
- Cunard in 1895
- Born: Maud Alice Burke; 3 August 1872; San Francisco, California, U.S.
- Died: 10 July 1948 (aged 75); London, England
- Spouse(s): Sir Bache Cunard, Bt (m. 1895; died 1925)
- Children: Nancy Cunard

Maud Alice, Lady Cunard (née Burke; 3 August 1872 – 10 July 1948), later known as Emerald, was an American-born, London-based society hostess. She was married to Sir Bache Cunard, 3rd Baronet, the grandson of the Cunard shipping line founder, Sir Samuel Cunard. Lady Cunard was known for having long-lasting relationships with novelist George Moore and the conductor Thomas Beecham, and was the muse of the former and a champion of and fund-raiser for the latter. She was a supporter of Wallis Simpson during the British abdication crisis of 1936, vainly hoping for a court appointment. The Second World War ended her era of private patronage and lavish hospitality.

== Biography ==
=== Early years ===
Maud Burke was born in San Francisco, to an Irish-American father, James Burke (who claimed descent from the Irish rebel Robert Emmet) and his half-French wife, Alicia Salendin. She was brought up in New York, where she became a devotee of music, hearing her first Wagner (the complete Ring cycle) when she was 12. She hoped to marry Prince André Poniatowski, grandson of the last King of Poland, but he jilted her and in April 1895 she married Sir Bache Cunard, 3rd Baronet, grandson of the founder of the Cunard shipping line. He was 21 years her senior, and despite his affection for her, they had little in common. He preferred to live at his country house, Nevill Holt Hall, in Leicestershire, where he was a keen huntsman. His wife began to establish a reputation as a hostess, "with a taste for the arts, or for artists anyhow, especially musicians", and was known for being extremely well read in French and English literature.

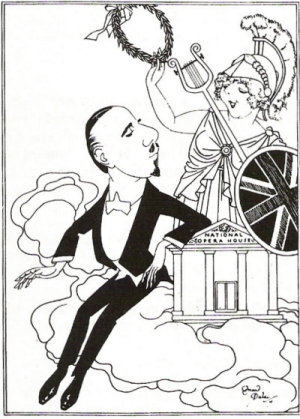
Lady Cunard as Britannia, with Sir Thomas Beecham, 1919

Among Lady Cunard's artistic friends was the novelist George Moore, who was deeply in love with her, and to whom she was an inspiration, appearing in many guises in his novels. Moore's love was reciprocated less strongly by Lady Cunard. The Cunards had a daughter, Nancy, in 1896, described by a biographer as "gifted and lonely" and largely neglected by her parents. Moore did not discourage the widespread belief that he, not Cunard, was Nancy's father, but this is not generally credited by historians, and it is not certain that Moore's relationship with Nancy's mother was ever more than platonic. Moore was believed by some to be impotent and was described as "one who told but didn't kiss".

=== London hostess ===
In 1911, leaving Cunard in Leicestershire, Lady Cunard moved to London with Nancy. The biographer Alan Jefferson writes, "Soon she had captured all London society, and her … salon became the most important Mecca for musicians, painters, sculptors, poets and writers as well as for politicians, soldiers, aristocrats – indeed anybody so long as they were interesting". The Times wrote of her, "Lady Cunard was probably the most lavish hostess of her day." The then Prince of Wales met Sir Oswald Mosley, leader of the British Union of Fascists, at her home in 1935.

In 1911, the Cunards formally separated by common agreement. At about this time, to the dismay of Moore, Lady Cunard fell in love with the conductor Thomas Beecham and became widely recognised in society as his companion. She was a tireless fund-raiser and persuaded many rich and upper-class people to support Beecham's extravagant operatic ventures. This was always important to Beecham, and it became more so after the First World War, when his finances were much depleted. Cunard died in 1925, and his widow never remarried. In the years after Cunard's death, she took to calling herself "Emerald", by which name she was known for the rest of her life (though not by either Moore or Beecham).

=== Later years ===
The widowed Lady Cunard took up residence in Grosvenor Square. David Lloyd George considered Lady Cunard "a most dangerous woman", because although she was not greatly interested in politics, she beguiled senior politicians such as Lord Curzon into indiscreet statements at her dinner table. Among her regular guests in the 1930s was her fellow American Wallis Simpson, whose liaison with Edward, Prince of Wales she encouraged, thus reinforcing Queen Mary's disapproval of the Cunard set. Believing that Mrs. Simpson would become queen, Lady Cunard hoped to be rewarded with the post of Mistress of the Robes in the new court. When her dream was dashed by Edward's abdication in 1936, she wept and lamented "How could he do this to me!" In the aftermath of the abdication, Cunard's association with Simpson tainted her social reputation considerably, although she took pains to distance herself, telling friends she had never met Wallis. At events attended by the Royal Family, Cunard would have to wait until they left before she could gain admission.

Lady Diana Cooper described Cunard's generous habit of helping out friends in financial trouble: "If Emerald caught me or my kind forgoing a treat for economy's sake, she would casually call, pretend to fancy a picture or a table or a rug, and insist on buying it for double its worth." In this way she accumulated an eclectic assortment of art and furniture, which was part of a more focused collection of valuable 18th century French furniture she had acquired over the years on the expert advice of friends and dealers.

The outbreak of the Second World War marked the end of the lavish entertainment and private patronage of hostesses such as Lady Cunard and her rival Sibyl, Lady Colefax. Beecham's residence in the US in the early years of the war led Lady Cunard to move to New York, where she set up home in a luxurious hotel. In 1942, she learned from an acquaintance that Beecham was going to marry the pianist Betty Humby. She returned to London and moved into the Dorchester Hotel where she died, miserable and lonely, at the age of 75. Her ashes were scattered in Grosvenor Square.
