= Cunard baronets =

Extinct baronetcy in the Baronetage of the United Kingdom

The Cunard Baronetcy, of Bush Hill in the County of Middlesex, was a title in the Baronetage of the United Kingdom. It was created in 1859 for Samuel Cunard, the Canadian-born British shipping magnate. He was succeeded in the baronetcy by his elder son Sir Edward, the second baronet. Upon the second baronet's sudden death in 1869, he was succeeded by his eldest son, Sir Bache, the third baronet. The third baronet married Maud Burke, by whom he had one child, Nancy Cunard, and was succeeded in the title at his death in 1925 by his younger brother Sir Gordon, the fourth baronet. The fourth baronet survived his brother by eight years; at his death in 1933, he was succeeded by his eldest son Sir Edward, the fifth baronet. The fifth baronet was a lifelong bachelor, and at his death in 1962, the senior line of descent from the first baronet failed. He was succeeded by a second cousin once removed, Sir Henry, who became the sixth baronet and was a great-great-grandson of the first baronet through his younger son William (1825–1906). Also a bachelor, the sixth baronet was succeeded by his younger brother Sir Guy, the seventh and last baronet, in 1973. He was likewise a bachelor and the title became extinct upon his death in 1989.

== Halliwick House ==
The Cunards owned a substantial house in Winchmore Hill, Halliwick House. It was built by Sir Hugh Myddelton in 1613, after his work on the New River was almost complete. It was later for many years a Church of England school, Halliwick School, with extensions and ancillary buildings, where the Halliwick Concept was developed. It was demolished and Cunard Crescent a small private estate, was built in its place in the twenty-first century.

== Cunard baronets, of Bush Hill (1859) ==
- Sir Samuel Cunard, 1st Baronet (1787–1865)
- Sir Edward Cunard, 2nd Baronet (1816–1869)
- Sir Bache Cunard, 3rd Baronet (1851–1925) (married Maud Alice Burke)
- Sir Gordon Cunard, 4th Baronet (1857–1933)
- Sir Edward Cunard, 5th Baronet (1891–1962)
- Sir Henry Cunard, 6th Baronet (1909–1973)
- Sir Guy Cunard, 7th Baronet (1911–1989)
