= List of people from Thunder Bay =

The following people were born in, residents of, or are otherwise closely connected to the city of Thunder Bay, Ontario

== Activists ==
- Clifford Chadderton (1919–2013), World War II veteran and advocate for veterans; chief executive officer of The War Amps
- Rod Michano (born Toussaint Roderick Michano) (1964–), First Nations public speaker and educator, HIV/AIDS and LGBT activist

== Arts ==
=== Artists ===
- Keith Cole, performance artist
- Mary Riter Hamilton (1873–1954), painter
- Norval Morrisseau, also known as Copper Thunderbird (1932–2007), Ojibway artist
- Ruth Tye McKenzie

=== Film and television ===
- Marie Avgeropoulos (1986–), actress best known for roles in the films Hunt to Kill, starring Steve Austin; and 50/50, starring Seth Rogan and Joseph Gordon-Levitt; and the CW show The 100; has also had small roles in hit television shows like Fringe and 90210
- Richard Bocking (1931–2012), film producer and director
- Aurora Browne, actress and comedian, co-star in the CTV/Comedy Network production Comedy Inc
- Nanci Chambers (1963–), actress, best known for role as Lieutenant Loren Singer on the CBS television series JAG
- Kevin Durand (1974–), actor, best known for television roles as Joshua on the Fox series Dark Angel, Martin Keamy on the ABC series Lost, and films X-Men Origins: Wolverine and Devil's Knot
- Jeff Geddis (1975–), actor, best known for roles in Sophie and The Latest Buzz
- Michelle Latimer, actress, best known for role as Trish Simpkin in the Showcase soap opera Paradise Falls
- Dorothea Mitchell (1877–1976), lumberjack and co-founder of the Port Arthur Amateur Film Society; first single woman in Ontario to be granted homestead rights
- Trent Opaloch, film cinematographer, best known for his work with Neill Blomkamp and the Russo brothers
- Casey Walker, film and television director
- Sandy Webster, actor

=== Musicians ===
- Dave Azzolini, songwriter for Toronto-based pop-rock band The Golden Dogs
- Sydney Blu (1977–), music producer and DJ
- Lauri Conger, keyboardist and songwriter for Parachute Club
- Bobby Curtola (1944–2016), early rock and roll singer and one-time teen idol
- Gaye Delorme (1947–2011), songwriter and guitarist
- Jaida Dreyer, country music singer-songwriter
- Natasha Fisher, singer-songwriter
- Don Grashey (1925–2005), songwriter and record producer
- Jessica Grassia, keyboardist, vocalist, and percussionist for Toronto-based pop-rock band The Golden Dogs
- Coleman Hell (1989–), singer, songwriter, dance producer
- Gary Kendall, bassist for Downchild Blues Band
- Hugh Le Caine (1914–1977), physicist, composer, inventor; built the Electronic Sackbut, one of the first synthesizers
- Daniel MacMaster (1968–2008), singer for the Canadian/British hard rock band Bonham
- Paul Shaffer (1949–), musician, actor, and comedian, best known as the bandleader on David Letterman’s Late Night and Late Show programs.
- Derek Sharp (1965–), rock singer, and guitarist; current lead singer of The Guess Who
- Ian Tamblyn (1947–), Juno Award-winning folk singer-songwriter, record producer and playwright

=== Writers ===
- Karen Autio, Finnish Canadian writer of children's fiction, notably the Saara Mäki historical novel trilogy.
- Michael Christie, short story writer and Scotiabank Giller Prize nominee
- Shane Peacock (1957–), writer of books for young adults
- Diane Schoemperlen (1954–), poet, novelist and short story writer
- Duncan Weller (1975–), children's book writer and illustrator who won the 2007 Governor General's Award for Children's Literature – Illustration for his book The Boy from the Sun

== Business ==
- Derek Burney (1939–), civil servant, businessman and former diplomat
- Mel Pervais (1940–), Ojibwe, entrepreneur, energy industry executive
- Michael Rapino (1965–), CEO and President of Live Nation Entertainment
- James Whalen (1869–1929), businessman and entrepreneur with interests in forestry, shipbuilding, dredging, and towing

== Educators ==
- Bruce Muirhead, historian and academic whose work focuses on Canada's foreign trade policy
- Penny Petrone (1925–2005), writer, educator, patron of the arts, and philanthropist
- Roy Piovesana (1942–2020), teacher and historian
- Gary Polonsky (1942–), educator, founding President and Vice-Chancellor of the University of Ontario Institute of Technology

== Journalists ==
- Maurice Russell Brown (1912–2008), mining journalist
- Robin Philpot (1948–), journalist, Quebec nationalist
- Lorne Saxberg (1958–2006), broadcast journalist, news anchor on CBC Newsworld and NHK

== Law ==
- Bora Laskin (1912–1984), jurist, former Chief Justice of the Supreme Court of CanadaOfficial Biography, Supreme Court of Canada website. Retrieved on April 20, 2007.
- Arthur Mauro (1927–), lawyer, businessman 2

 University Of lakehead 

== Military ==
- Colonel Robert "Bob" Angus Keane DSO OBE ED CD (1914-1977), Canadian Army officer, Commanded The Lake Superior Regiment (Motor) during the Second World War and later commanded the 2nd Battalion, The Royal Canadian Regiment during the Korean War.
- Elizabeth Lawrie Smellie (1884–1968), nurse, first woman to be promoted to the rank of colonel in the Canadian Army

== Politics ==
- Bob Andras (1921–1982), Liberal Member of Parliament for Port Arthur and Thunder Bay–Nipigon
- Iain Angus (1947–), Canadian politician, Thunder Bay City Councillor
- Hubert Badanai (born in Azzano Decimo, Italy) (1895–1986), automobile dealer and politician
- Ken Boshcoff (1949–), former mayor, Liberal Member of Parliament for Thunder Bay—Rainy River
- Joe Comuzzi (1933–), Conservative Member of Parliament for Thunder Bay—Superior North
- James Conmee (born in Sydenham Township, Canada West) (1848–1913), businessman, politician
- Donald James Cowan (born in Drumbo, Blenheim Township, Oxford County, Ontario) (1883–1964), mayor of Port Arthur, 1916–1917; Crown attorney for Thunder Bay District, Ontario
- Charles Winnans Cox (born in Westminster Township, Middlesex County, Ontario) (1882–1958), longest-serving mayor of Port Arthur, 1934–1948 and 1952
- Simon James Dawson (born in Redhaven, Banffshire, Scotland) (1820–1902), surveyor, civil engineer, politician
- Stan Dromisky (1931–2023), retired MP
- Ernie Epp (born in Winnipeg, Manitoba) (1941–), historian, former politician
- Doug Fisher (1919–2009), political columnist and politician
- Jim Foulds (1937–), former New Democratic Party MPP for Port Arthur
- Clarence Decatur Howe (born in Waltham, Massachusetts, United States) (1886–1960), politician, "Minister of Everything"
- Saul Laskin (1918–2008), first mayor of Thunder Bay and only Jewish mayor elected at the Lakehead; brother to Bora Laskin
- Robert James Manion (born in Pembroke, Ontario) (1881–1943), politician, leader of the Conservative Party 1938–1940
- Steve Mantis (born in Reading, Pennsylvania) (1950-), politician and former National Coordinator of the Canadian Injured Worker Alliance
- Jack Masters (1931–), former mayor of Thunder Bay and MP for Thunder Bay–Nipigon
- Lyn McLeod (1942–), Ontario politician, former leader of the Ontario Liberal Party
- Paul McRae (born in Toronto) (1924–1992), Liberal MP for Fort William
- Bev Oda (1944–), Conservative Member of Parliament for Durham, Ontario; Japanese Canadian
- Kevin Page (1957–), Canada's first Parliamentary Budget Officer
- George Wardrope (1899–1980), Progressive Conservative MPP for Port Arthur

== Scientists ==
- Claude Garton (1907-1996), botanist
- Sanford Jackson (1909–2000), biochemist, inventor of the bilirubinometer
- Elsie MacGill (1905–1980), aeronautical engineer, the "Queen of the Hurricanes"
- David Pall (1914–2004), chemist, inventor of the Pall filter used in blood transfusions

== Sports ==
=== Baseball ===
- Jeff Heath (1915–1975), left fielder for the Cleveland Indians, St Louis Browns, and Boston Braves

=== Curling ===
- Al Hackner (1954–), curler
- Katherine Henderson, president and CEO of Curling Canada
- Heather Houston (1958–), curler
- Krista McCarville (1982–), curler
- Lorraine Lang (1956–), curler, currently plays the alternate for Krista McCarville.
- Rick Lang (1953–), curler, currently serves as a performance consultant for Curling Canada.
- Sarah Potts (1989–), curler, currently plays lead for Krista McCarville.
- Frank Sargent (1902–1988), inductee into the Canadian Curling Hall of Fame and former president of the Dominion Curling Association

=== Ice hockey ===
- Jack Adams (1895–1968), hockey player; coach and general manager of the Detroit Red Wings
- Jeremy Adduono (1978–), left winger, Iserlohn Roosters (DEL)
- Alex Auld (1981–), goaltender, Ottawa Senators (NHL)
- Pete Backor (1919–1988), defenceman for the Toronto Maple Leafs (NHL), 1944–1945
- Peter Bakovic (1965–), retired left winger in the late 1980s for the Vancouver Canucks (NHL)
- Steve Black (1927–2008), retired hockey player
- Mackenzie Blackwood (1996–), goaltender for the Colorado Avalanche (NHL)
- Bob Bodak (1961–), retired ice hockey player for the Calgary Flames and Hartford Whalers (NHL), 1987–1990
- Gus Bodnar (1923–2005), centre for Toronto Maple Leafs and other NHL teams, winner of the Calder Trophy
- Brooke Boquist (1996–), ice hockey player
- Robert Bortuzzo (1989–), defenseman for the Utah Mammoth
- Danny Bois (1983–), winger for the Ottawa Senators (NHL)
- David Bruce (1964–), retired ice hockey player for various teams in the NHL
- Mike Busniuk (1951–), retired ice hockey player for the Philadelphia Flyers
- Larry Cahan (1933–1992), NHL player
- Michela Cava (1994–), professional ice hockey player for the Ottawa Charge
- Taylor Chorney (1987–), defenceman for North Dakota Fighting Sioux (WCHA), prospect of the Edmonton Oilers
- Tom Cook (1907–1961), retired forward for Montreal Maroons and Chicago Blackhawks
- Alex Delvecchio (1931–), former centre and left winger for Detroit Red Wings and member of the Hockey Hall of Fame
- Lee Fogolin (1955–), retired NHL defenceman
- Lee Fogolin, Sr. (1927–2000), retired ice hockey player for Detroit Red Wings and Chicago Black Hawks
- Bruce Gamble (1938–1982), former professional ice hockey goaltender, Toronto Maple Leafs
- Dave Gatherum (1932–), former professional ice hockey goaltender, briefly with the Detroit Red Wings
- Pete Goegan (1934–), retired NHL player
- Bill "Goldie" Goldthorpe (1953–), retired career minor leaguer, the inspiration for the character Ogie Ogilthorpe in the film Slap Shot
- Smokey Harris (1890–1974), ice hockey forward, started his career with the Vancouver Millionaires
- Jeff Heerema (1980–), professional ice hockey winger for the Carolina Hurricanes and the St. Louis Blues in the NHL and with the Binghamton Senators (AHL)
- Katherine Henderson, president and CEO of Hockey Canada
- Bill Houlder (1967–), retired professional ice hockey defenceman
- Carter Hutton (1985–), goaltender for the Buffalo Sabres
- Tony Hrkac (1966–), retired professional ice hockey centre
- Haley Irwin (1988–), women's ice hockey player for the Calgary Inferno, and Olympic gold medalist in 2010 and 2014
- Jason Jaspers (1981–), professional ice hockey centre for Kölner Haie (DEL)
- Trevor Johansen (1957–), retired ice hockey player for various teams in the NHL
- Greg Johnson (1971–2019), retired NHL centre, notably the Detroit Red Wings
- Ryan Johnson (1976–), ice hockey player, St. Louis Blues (NHL)
- Scott King (1967–), goaltender for the Detroit Red Wings (NHL)
- Edgar Laprade (born in Mine Centre, Ontario) (1919–2014) centre for the New York Rangers 1945-1955, winner of Calder Trophy (1945–46) and Lady Byng Trophy (1949–50); played in NHL All-Star Game 1947, 1948, 1949, 1950; member of Hockey Hall of Fame.
- David Latta (1976–), left winger for Quebec Nordiques (NHL)
- Trevor Letowski (1977–), retired right winger, Carolina Hurricanes (NHL); head coach Windsor Spitfires (OHL)
- Danny Lewicki (1931–), retired ice hockey forward
- Pentti Lund (born in Karijoki, Finland) (1925–), retired ice hockey player, began his career with the Port Arthur Bruins
- Norm Maciver (1964–), retired ice hockey player, scored the final goal in Winnipeg Jets history
- Calum MacKay (1927–2001), former ice hockey player, notably of the Montreal Canadiens
- Connie Madigan (1958–1976), retired professional defenceman; oldest rookie in National Hockey League history
- Jimmy McLeod (1937–), retired ice hockey player for the NHL and WHA
- Matt Murray (1994–), goaltender for the Toronto Maple Leafs
- Fred Page (1915–1997), Hockey Hall of Fame inductee, former president of the Canadian Amateur Hockey Association
- Steve Passmore (1973–), professional ice hockey goaltender for HCJ Milano Vipers, Italian Serie A
- Walt Poddubny (1960–2009), former professional ice hockey left winger
- Chris Porter (1984–), former NHL left winger, currently playing for Providence Bruins
- Sean Pronger (1972–), ice hockey player
- Nelson Pyatt (1953–), retired ice hockey player
- Taylor Pyatt (1981–), retired ice hockey player for the NHL
- Tom Pyatt (1987–), centre for the Vancouver Canucks (NHL)
- Steve Rucchin (1971–), retired NHL centre, notably for Anaheim Ducks (NHL)
- Charlie Sands (1911–?), professional ice hockey right winger
- Frank Sargent (1902–1988), former president of the Canadian Amateur Hockey Association
- Patrick Sharp (1981–), left wing, Chicago Blackhawks (NHL)
- Dave Siciliano (1946–), ice hockey coach for the Thunder Bay Flyers and inductee into the Northwestern Ontario Sports Hall of Fame
- Eric Staal (1984–), centre, Florida Panthers (NHL)
- Jared Staal (1990–), retired NHL player
- Jordan Staal (1988–), centre, Carolina Hurricanes (NHL)
- Marc Staal (1987–), defenceman, Florida Panthers (NHL)
- Vern Stenlund (1956–), retired centre left for the Cleveland Barons
- Ralph Stewart (1948–), retired NHL defenceman for the Vancouver Canucks
- Ron Talakoski (1962–2009), retired ice hockey player for the New York Rangers (NHL)
- Mike Tomlak (1965–), retired ice hockey centre
- Vic Venasky (1951–), retired ice hockey player for the Los Angeles Kings (NHL)
- Gary Veneruzzo (1943–), retired NHL player
- Jimmy Ward (1906–1990), former NHL right winger
- Katie Weatherston (1983–), Olympian women's ice hockey player and Olympic gold medallist
- Arnott Whitney (1931–2024), defenceman, Hershey Bears
- Joe Wirkkunen (1928–1986), Finnish-Canadian ice hockey coach

=== Skiing ===
- Steve Collins (1964–), retired ski jumper, the youngest person ever to have won a Ski jumping World Cup event
- Dave Irwin (1954–), two-time Olympic downhill skier

=== Wrestling ===
- Melissa Coates (1971-2021), professional wrestler and fitness model
- Paul Diamond (born Tom Boric) (1961–), retired professional wrestler and soccer player, best known being one half of the tag-team "Badd Company"
- Vampiro (born Ian Richard Hodgkinson) (1967–), professional wrestler

=== Other ===
- Richard Xavier Baxter (1821–1904), Jesuit priest, known as ‘the Apostle of the Railway Builders’
- Gordy Ceresino (1957–), retired football linebacker for the San Francisco 49ers
- Mary DePiero (1968–), diver
- Keegan Gaunt (2000–), visually-impaired middle-distance runner
- Curt Harnett (1965–), retired Olympic cyclist
- Dan Ladouceur (1973–), retired lacrosse defenceman for the Toronto Rock (NLL)
- Jay Miron (1970–), professional BMX rider, has competed in every X-Games competition since 1995
- Liam Parsons (1977–), retired rower; bronze medallist at the Beijing 2008 Summer Olympics
- Bryan Rosenfeld (1965–), retired association football player
- Trevor Stewardson (1977–), light heavyweight boxer; competed for Canada at the 2004 Summer Olympics

== Miscellaneous ==
- Barbara Kentner (1982–2017), murdered in 2017
- Viljo Rosvall and Janne Voutilainen, unionists and martyrs; mysteriously disappeared on November 18, 1929
- Ryan Wedding snowboarding Olympian turn druglord was place on the FBI Ten Most Wanted Fugitives on March 6, 2025
