= Climate Change Accountability Act =

Climate Change Accountability Act may refer to

- Climate Change Accountability Act (Bill C-224) - bill in the Parliament of Canada
- Climate Change Accountability Act, 2007 - legislation relating to climate change, in British Columbia
