= Bill C-560: Cell Phone Freedom Act =

Proposed Canadian federal legislation

Parliament of Canada
- Long title: Bill C-560: An Act respecting the locking of cellular telephones
- Considered by: House of Commons of Canada

Legislative history
- Bill title: C-560: An Act respecting the locking of cellular telephones
- Introduced by: Bruce Hyer
- First reading: June 17, 2010
- Status: Not passed

Bill C-560: Cell Phone Freedom Act

House of Commons of Canada
- Considered by: House of Commons of Canada

Legislative history
- Bill title: C-343: An Act respecting the locking of cellular telephones
- Introduced by: Bruce Hyer
- First reading: November 3, 2011
- Status: Not passed

Bill C-560: Cell Phone Freedom Act (French: Projet de loi concernant le verrouillage des téléphones cellulaires) was a private member's bill proposed twice to the Parliament of Canada by an opposition member of Parliament. If passed, it would have required mobile phone providers to remove the SIM lock from devices, once a customer reached the end of their contract.

It was first introduced on June 17, 2010 in the House of Commons of Canada as Bill C-560 by Bruce Hyer, then the New Democratic Party Small Business Critic and Member of Parliament for Thunder Bay—Superior North. Bill C-560 died on the Order paper when Parliament was dissolved after the government's defeat on a confidence vote in March 2011. Hyer reintroduced the Cell Phone Freedom Act in the new session of Parliament on November 3, 2011, as Bill C-343. That version of the bill was not passed by the House of Commons.

== Provisions ==
The Cell Phone Freedom Act, if passed, would have mandated that:

- consumers buying new cell phones in Canada must be informed of the existence of any SIM lock (also known as a network lock) on their phone before sale;
- wireless phone companies must unlock handsets upon request, without fee, when a consumer purchases a new phone outright (unsubsidized) without a contract;
- wireless phone companies must unlock handsets upon request, without fee, when a consumer comes to the end of their contract, or at any time thereafter.

Under the proposed legislation, wireless service providers could still employ such locks on customer phones while under contract, so it was unlikely to impact the common practice of offering subsidized phones on contracts.

In introducing the Cell Phone Freedom Act in Parliament, Hyer commented that the bill would provide more consumer choice and competition in the wireless market. He mentioned that unlike many other countries, Canada did not have any regulations to allow consumers to unlock their cellular phones and move to other carriers. In his opinion, that meant less consumer choice, higher prices and worse services. The bill would require the vendor of the cellular phone to advise the purchaser of any locks prior to the sale, and to unlock the cellular phone at the end of the contract.

== Results ==
Rogers Wireless (and its sub-brand Fido Solutions) announced on December 15, 2010 that they would start offering to unlock all of their customers handsets for a flat fee of $50, in response to public pressure on the issue. The other two major national carriers, Bell Mobility and Telus Mobility, and their sub-brands followed suit in early 2011 provided that the device operated on their network as well as having a postpaid account for at least 90 days.

While the bill never became law, SIM locking was ultimately banned in Canada on December 1, 2017 as part of amendments to the Canadian Radio-television and Telecommunications Commission's Wireless Code. All new devices in Canada must be sold unlocked, and carriers must offer to unlock existing phones free-of-charge.
