= Kyocera DIGNO T =

2014 smartphone model

DIGNO T 302KC
- Brand: Y!mobile
- Manufacturer: Kyocera
- First released: September 11, 2014
- Compatible networks: UMTS, GSM; Data: AXGP, LTE, UMTS, GSM; Frequencies: AXGP 2.5 GHz / LTE Bands 1/8 / UMTS Bands 1/8 / GSM Tri-Band
- Form factor: Bar
- Colors: Black; White; Blue; Orange; Green
- Dimensions: 132 mm (5.2 in) H 65 mm (2.6 in) W 11.2 mm (0.44 in) D
- Weight: 139 g (4.9 oz)
- Operating system: Android 4.4.2
- CPU: 1.2 GHz quad-core Qualcomm Snapdragon 400 (MSM8926)
- Memory: 1.5 GB RAM
- Storage: 8 GB ROM
- Removable storage: microSD (up to 2 GB), microSDHC (up to 32 GB)
- Battery: 2,000 mAh (removable)
- Rear camera: Approx. 8 megapixels CMOS image sensor
- Front camera: Approx. 1.96 megapixels CMOS image sensor
- Display: 4.5-inch TFT, qHD (540 × 960 pixels), approx. 16.77 million colors
- Model: 302KC
- Other: Shock resistance: MIL-STD-810G Method 516.6:Shock-Procedure IV

The DIGNO T 302KC is a 3.9G smartphone manufactured by Kyocera for Y!mobile (compatible with its "Phone Service (Type 1)") released on September 11, 2014.

== Specifcations ==
=== Connectivity ===
The 302KC features a suite of pre-installed Yahoo! applications. Because the device relies on the SoftBank Mobile network infrastructure (formerly EMOBILE 4G-S, marking the first implementation of Hybrid 4G LTE specifications), carrier email utilizes the `ymobile.ne.jp` domain. Existing users transitioning from `emobile-s.ne.jp` or `wcm.ne.jp` may continue using their addresses in some circumstances, with messaging managed via Google+ Hangouts. The disaster emergency alert system also follows the SoftBank Mobile configuration. However, the device cannot access Y!mobile's native legacy network infrastructure (LTE Band 3 / UMTS Band 9). Likely due to its integration with the SoftBank Mobile ecosystem, the 302KC includes a SIM lock, differentiating it from the 302HW.

=== Protection and durability ===
This device features a rugged design equipped with IPX5/IPX7 waterproof ratings, IP5X dustproof protection, and MIL-STD-810G Method 516.6:Shock-Procedure IV military-grade shock resistance.

=== Display, hardware and software ===
It carries a 4.5-inch qHD display (960×540 pixels) and utilizes Kyocera's proprietary "Smart Sonic Receiver" technology, which vibrates the screen to deliver clear audio in noisy environments. Powered by a 1.2 GHz quad-core MSM8926 processor with 1.5 GB of RAM and 8 GB of internal storage, the phone runs on Android 4.4 and supports Wi-Fi and Bluetooth 4.0. Its camera system consists of an 8-megapixel rear camera and a 1.96-megapixel front camera. Weighing approximately 139 grams, the device is available in five colors, including a special green variant released to commemorate the "Tour de Tohoku 2014" cycling event.
