= Bill C-377: Climate Change Accountability Act =

Proposed Canadian federal law

Parliament of Canada
- Long title: Bill C-377: An Act to ensure Canada assumes its responsibilities in preventing dangerous climate change
- Considered by: House of Commons
- Considered by: Senate

Legislative history

Initiating chamber: House of Commons
- Bill title: Bill C-377: Climate Change Accountability Act
- Introduced by: Jack Layton
- First reading: October 2006
- Second reading: April 25, 2007
- Voting summary: 152 voted for; 115 voted against
- Considered in committee: December 11, 2007 to April 20, 2008
- Third reading: June 4, 2008
- Voting summary: 148 voted for; 116 voted against

Revising chamber: Senate
- First reading: June 10, 2008
- Second reading: Not reached
- Status: Not passed

Bill C-377: Climate Change Accountability Act

Parliament of Canada
- Long title: Bill C-311: An Act to ensure Canada assumes its responsibilities in preventing dangerous climate change
- Considered by: House of Commons of Canada
- Considered by: Senate

Legislative history

Initiating chamber: House of Commons of Canada
- Bill title: C-311: Climate Change Accountability Act
- Introduced by: Bruce Hyer
- First reading: February 10, 2009
- Second reading: April 1, 2009
- Voting summary: 141 voted for; 128 voted against
- Considered in committee: June 18, 2009 to December 8, 2009
- Third reading: May 5, 2010
- Voting summary: 149 voted for; 136 voted against

Revising chamber: Senate
- First reading: May 6, 2010
- Second reading: November 16, 2010
- Voting summary: 32 voted for; 43 voted against
- Third reading: Not reached
- Status: Not passed

Bill C-377: Climate Change Accountability Act

Parliament of Canada
- Long title: Bill C-224: An Act to ensure Canada assumes its responsibilities in preventing dangerous climate change
- Considered by: House of Commons of Canada

Legislative history
- Bill title: C-224: Climate Change Accountability Act
- Introduced by: Megan Leslie
- First reading: June 15, 2011
- Second reading: Not reached
- Status: Not passed

Bill C-377: Climate Change Accountability Act was a Private Member's bill that was introduced three times in the Canadian Parliament, in the 39th, 40th and 41st Canadian Parliaments.

The first version of the bill, Bill C-377, was introduced in 2006 by Jack Layton, the leader of the New Democratic Party (NDP). It was introduced again in 2009 as Bill C-311 by another NDP member of Parliament, Bruce Hyer, and finally in 2011 as Bill C-224 by Megan Leslie in 2011. The different versions of the bill had varying success in the House of Commons and the Senate of Canada, but none were passed by Parliament.

The purpose of the bill was to require the federal government to set medium and long term emissions levels of climate change gases.

== Legislative history ==
=== Bill C-377: 2006 ===
Jack Layton, the leader of the New Democratic Party of Canada (NDP), introduced the bill for the first time in October 2006 in the House of Commons as Bill C-377 of the 39th Parliament. It passed third reading by a vote of 148 to 116 with the support of caucuses of the Liberals, the Bloc Québécois and the NDP; the Conservative caucus, led by Prime Minister Stephen Harper, voted against it. However, Bill C-377 died on the Order paper as it was still before the Senate when Parliament was dissolved for the 2008 Canadian federal election.

=== Bill C-311: 2009 ===
On February 10, 2009, Bruce Hyer, then the New Democrat Deputy Environment Critic and MP for Thunder Bay-Superior North, seconded by Layton, reintroduced it in the 40th Parliament as Bill C-311. It passed second reeading on April 1, 2009, by a vote of 141 to 128, and was sent to the Standing Committee on the Environment and Sustainable Development. On October 21, 2009, the House voted 169 to 93 to allow the Committee more time to study the Bill, as the sixty sitting days permitted for its consideration under Standing Order 97.1(1) of the House of Commons had expired. Passage of the Climate Change Accountability Act was therefore effectively delayed until 2010, meaning it would not influence the government in negotiations at the UN COP15 global climate change treaty negotiations held in December 2009 in Copenhagen. On December 10, 2009, the committee report on Bill C-311 was presented to the House, without amendment to the Bill.

The prorogation of Parliament on December 30, 2009 did not affect the bill, as private member's bills are reinstated at the stage last completed prior to prorogation. When Parliament resumed, C-311 was concurred in at report stage on April 14, 2010, by a vote of 155 to 137.

The bill was passed by the House of Commons on third reading on May 5, 2010, with 149 votes for and 136 votes against. It received first reading in the Senate on May 6, 2010, before being defeated on second reading on November 16, 2010, by a vote of 43 to 32.

=== Bill C-224: 2011 ===
Following the 2011 federal election, the bill was re-introduced in the House of Commons as Bill C-224 on June 15, 2011, by the new NDP Environment Critic and MP for Halifax, Megan Leslie. The bill was seconded by the NDP Deputy Environment Critic Laurin Liu. The bill never came to second reading

== Provisions ==
The bill would have required that the Canadian federal government set regulations to attain a medium-term target to bring greenhouse gas emissions 25% below 1990 levels by 2020, and a long-term target to bring emissions 80% below 1990 levels by 2050. According to the summary, the purpose of this bill was:

to ensure that Canada meets its global climate change obligations under the United Nations Framework Convention on Climate Change by committing to a long-term target to reduce Canadian greenhouse gas emissions to a level that is 80% below the 1990 level by the year 2050, and by establishing interim targets for the period 2015 to 2045. It creates an obligation on the Commissioner of the Environment and Sustainable Development to review proposed measures to meet the targets and submit a report to Parliament. It also sets out the duties of the National Round Table on the Environment and the Economy.

The Climate Change Accountability Act was based on the Case for Deep Reductions report by the National Round Table on the Environment and the Economy and on guidelines set by the United Nations Framework Convention on Climate Change. These are the same emissions targets adopted by the European Union and announced as objectives of U.S. President Obama's New Energy For America strategy.
