= SIM lock =

Restriction built into a mobile phone

A SIM lock, simlock, network lock, carrier lock or (master) subsidy lock is a technical restriction built into GSM and CDMA mobile phones by mobile phone manufacturers for use by service providers to restrict the use of these phones to specific countries and/or networks. This is in contrast to a phone (retrospectively called SIM-free or unlocked) that does not impose any SIM restrictions.

Generally phones can be locked to accept only SIM cards with certain International Mobile Subscriber Identities (IMSIs); IMSIs may be restricted by:

- Mobile country code (MCC; e.g., will only work with SIM issued in one country)
- Mobile network code (MNC; e.g., AT&T Mobility, T-Mobile, Vodafone, Bell Mobility etc.)
- Mobile subscriber identification number (MSIN; i.e., only one SIM can be used with the phone)

Additionally, some phones, especially Nokia phones, are locked by group IDs (GIDs), restricting them to a single Mobile virtual network operator (MVNO) of a certain operator.

Most mobile phones can be unlocked to work with any GSM network provider, but the phone may still display the original branding and may not support features of the new carrier. Besides the locking, phones may also have firmware installed on them which is specific to the network provider. For example, a Vodafone or Telstra branded phone in Australia will display the relevant logo and may only support features provided by that network (e.g. Vodafone Live!). This firmware is installed by the service provider and is separate from the locking mechanism. Most phones can be unbranded by reflashing a different firmware version, a procedure recommended for advanced users only. The reason many network providers SIM lock their phones is that they offer phones at a discount to customers in exchange for a contract to pay for the use of the network for a specified time period, usually between one and three years. This business model allows the company to recoup the cost of the phone over the life of the contract. Such discounts are worth up to several hundred US dollars. If the phones were not locked, users might sign a contract with one company, get the discounted phone, then stop paying the monthly bill (thus breaking the contract) and start using the phone on another network or even sell the phone for a profit. SIM locking curbs this by prohibiting change of network (using a new SIM).

In some countries, SIM locking is very common if subsidized phones are sold with prepaid contracts. The technology associated with the phone must be compatible with the technology being used by the network carrier. A GSM cell phone will only work with a GSM carrier and will not work on a CDMA network provider. Likewise, a CDMA cell phone will only work with a CDMA carrier and will not work on a GSM network provider. Note that newer (2013+) high end mobile phones are capable of supporting both CDMA and GSM technologies, allowing customers to use their mobile devices on any network. Examples of these mobile devices are the Apple iPhone 5c, 6 and newer, Motorola's G4, G5, X Pure, Samsung's Galaxy S6, S7, S8 smart phones, mostly phones based on a Qualcomm Snapdragon chipset or radio.

In some jurisdictions, such as Canada, Chile, China, Israel, and Singapore it is illegal for providers to sell SIM locked devices. In other countries, carriers may not be required to unlock devices or may require the consumer to pay a fee for unlocking.

Unlocking the phone, however, is almost universally legal. Additionally, it is often legal for carriers to force SIM locks for certain amounts of time, varying by region.

== Unlocking technology ==
A handset can be unlocked by entering a code provided by the network operator. Alternative mechanisms include software running on the handset or a computer attached to the handset, hardware devices that connect to the handset or over-the-air by the carrier. Usually the unlock process is permanent. The code required to remove all locks from a phone is referred to as the master code, network code key, or multilock code. If the phone is network locked it will typically display one of the following messages: SIM network PIN blocked, Enter lock PIN.

There can also be multiple levels of locks placed on the phone by networks, which block the use of other networks' SIM cards. These are usually referred to as "Network Control Key" (NCK) and "Service Provider Control Key" (SPCK), additionally, a Regional lock exists which is specific to Europe and it is called "Region Control Key" (RGCK).

Typically, a locked handset will display a message if a restricted SIM is used, requesting the unlock code. On recent phone models running Android software, the phone will display a message saying "SIM network unlock PIN" or "Enter Network Lock Control Key" if network locked. Windows phones will display the message, "This SIM card can only be used on specific networks. Contact your customer service center for the unlock code". Other handsets may display different messages such as "Enter special code" or "Enter unlocking code," or in some cases the handset will simply display a message stating that it is locked. Once a valid code is entered, the handset will display "Network unlocked" or "Network unlock successful".

The unlock code is verified by the handset and is generated by the manufacturer, typically by an algorithm such as a one way hash or trapdoor function. Sometimes big telecom providers change the original factory unlock codes as an extra layer of security against unlocking services. For various big brands such as Samsung and Motorola there is no algorithm but just a random code generator where the unlock codes are programmed in the phone itself and then saved in a big database managed by the manufacturer. For the other brands where the unlock codes are still based on algorithms those are based on the IMEI number and the MCC code and have been reverse-engineered, stolen or leaked. Some handsets can be unlocked using software that generates an unlock code from an IMEI number and country and operator details using the algorithm specific to the handset. Other manufacturers have taken a more cautious approach, and embed a random number in the handset's firmware that is retained by the manufacturer and the network on whose behalf the lock was applied. These handsets can still be unlocked by online services that have access to either inside people with the manufacturer or with the telecom networks, or they need to be connected to the computer with a cable where specific software will bypass the security and SIM-unlock the phone. Sometimes this is done by advanced calculations to bypass the security the official way and other times using exploits or overwriting parts of the firmware where the lock status is kept, and often even recover a phone that is bricked or completely damaged in the software sense.

Most handsets have security measures built into their firmware that protects them from repeated attempts to guess the unlock code. After entering more than a certain number of incorrect codes the phone becomes frozen. This is a state where the phone will display a security message that the phone needs a service. Older phones could no longer be used at all at this point, however modern smartphones often keep working with the original SIM but require extra work to then unlock them correctly. In extreme situations physical access to internal hardware via in-circuit debugging may be utilised (for example, via JTAG headers on a circuit board). Such access may be required to modify initialization software used for booting.

=== Hardlocked phones ===
A hardlocked phone is one in which a telecom provider has modified the firmware on the phone to make it impossible to manually enter the unlock codes in any way.

=== Economics ===
Handset manufacturers have economic incentives both to strengthen SIM lock security (which placates network providers and enables exclusivity deals) and to weaken it (broadening a handset's appeal to customers who are not interested in the service provider that offers it). Also, making it too difficult to unlock a handset might make it less appealing to network service providers who have a legal obligation to provide unlock codes for certain handsets or in certain countries.

In some cases, a SIM-locked handset is sold at a substantially lower price than an unlocked one, because the service provider expects income through its service. SIM locks are employed on cheaper (pay-as-you-go) handsets, while discounts on more expensive handsets require a subscription that provides guaranteed income. Unlocked handsets have a higher market value, even more so if they are debranded. Debranding involves reflashing or replacing the firmware to remove the operator logo or any limitations or customizations that have been imposed on the handset by the operator, and is usually accomplished with software designed for a particular handset model, however, most smart-phones can be debranded and unlocked solely with the use of special software.

The main reason to unlock a handset is to be able to use it with a different SIM card. Consumers may wish to continue using their previous provider with a new handset or when traveling abroad they may wish to connect to a foreign network with a prepaid subscription.

Nevertheless, the fundamental principle of GSM and its successors, is open interfaces which encourage competition among multiple vendors. This is the reason a mobile phone is, in fact, a combination of a phone and the subscriber identity module (SIM). Locking the phone to a network is not much different from having the SIM built into the mobile phone. Network operators in many industrialized countries are not bound by law to give the phone unlocking code to subscribers even after the expiry of the contract period.

=== Box breaking ===
A practice known as box breaking is common in the United Kingdom and other markets. This involves purchasing subsidized handsets (usually pay-as-you-go) from retail stores, unlocking the phones, and then selling them (often abroad) for a higher price than the subsidised retail price. The SIM card that came with the handset is then either thrown away, sold, or used elsewhere. This practice is legal in the UK and provides a de facto limit to the extent to which networks are willing to subsidize pay-as-you-go handsets. While the act of box breaking is legal, some businesses are also engaging in illegal activities such as exporting the box-broken phones to other countries, to sell as grey market goods without paying import duties (known as carousel fraud) or substituting counterfeit batteries and chargers.

=== Unlocking services ===
Some companies offer an online unlocking service. This service requires that individuals who wish to unlock a handset provide their IMEI number and sometimes also country and operator details to the company, either via email or a website. The company will then provide the unlock code for the handset. For some brands such as Nokia and Samsung various services also offer special remote-unlocking software with instructions, where a cable is needed to remove the SIM lock at home. Such companies may email the unlocking code or software which will remotely unlock the device. Some companies also offer unlocking services that require sending the handset's IMEI number. Other companies sell unlocking hardware, including devices which fit between the SIM card and the phone to spoof the original network identifier during registration and devices to read and edit the handset's firmware. The pricing for unlocking a device will vary depending on the network it is locked to and the handset model itself, as each unlock code is unique to each individual handset.

==== Unlock code generators ====
There are online services that will provide an IMEI unlocking service for DCT4 and DCT3 Nokia mobile phones. This method of unlock requires the user to know which carrier the mobile phone is locked to, and also needs to provide an IMEI. Generally, older model Nokia unlock codes are free and instantly retrievable by these services. The unlock codes retrieved must be entered into the mobile phone using the keypad.

For DCT4 and DCT3 Nokia, unlock codes consist of a "#" key, followed by "pw+", 10 (DCT3) or 15 (DCT4) digits, "+", and another number ranging from 1-7, and finally ends with a "#". Depending on the carrier which the phone is locked to, only some codes will work with the mobile phone. Most phones respond to the unlock codes ending in +1# or +7#, however some phones are configured to allow only one of the seven codes to work. The following is an example of a DCT4/DCT3 unlock code:

# pw+931882753035021+7#

DCT4 and DCT3 Nokia will only allow a maximum of five unlock attempts using the unlock code method. After five incorrect codes have been inputted, the phone will not allow the user to try any more codes (even if it is correct) and will require the owner to try other unlock methods.

== Laws and practices ==
Many countries listed below have some form of SIM-locking laws specifying the period of SIM locking and the cost of obtaining unlocking codes.

=== Andorra ===
In Andorra, the state-owned communications mobile company Mobiland does not sell SIM-locked phones. As there is no competition, consumers usually buy standard mobile phones that are not locked to any specific carrier.

=== Austria ===
In Austria, unlocking is allowed at any time by the owner of the device. A lawsuit was decided in favor of a mobile operator who encouraged the unlocking of phones by providing links to free/cheap unlocking services.

T-Mobile Austria charges 150 euros to unlock the iPhone for prepaid subscribers and in contract subscribers. For subscribers who have finished their 2-year iPhone contract, T-Mobile Austria charges 50 euros to unlock the iPhone.

=== Australia ===
In Australia, carriers can choose whether to SIM/Network Lock handsets or not, however in practice, is rarely performed except in limited cases. Almost all handsets available on the Australian market have no such restriction.

One law professor, Dale Clapperton, gave a talk stating that bundling iPhone and mobile phone service could be violating the Trade Practices Act. However, no other legal professional or academic has come out in support of this viewpoint. This also doesn't address SIM locking per se, only as applied to subsidised iPhone purchases, and persistence of the lock beyond the contractual period.

=== Belgium ===
Until 2007, Belgium had laws prohibiting bundling, but they were challenged as violating European Directive 2005/29/EC The Unfair Commercial Practices Directive. On April 23, 2009, the European Court of Justice ruled against Belgium and struck down Belgium's anti-bundling law. The Belgian government was given until May 2009 to change the law, failing which the European Commission would commence proceedings against Belgium. This leaves Canada, China, Singapore, and Israel as the only countries in the world that forbid SIM locking and contract/phone bundling outright. Chile initiated a ban as of January 1, 2012.

=== Brazil ===
In Brazil, SIM locks are not prohibited. However, the mobile carrier must inform the consumer of the existence of a SIM lock. Anatel, Brazil's telecom regulator, requires the carrier to unlock free of charge the mobile phone if required by the user. After this regulation most telecom operators started voluntarily unlocking the devices as soon as it was purchased so one could leave the store with an unlocked phone.

=== Canada ===
Under revisions to the Canadian Radio-television and Telecommunications Commission (CRTC) Wireless Code of Conduct effective 1 December 2017, all new devices must be sold unlocked, and carriers must offer to unlock phones purchased prior to this date free of charge. Fees may be required if the customer was not under a contract or prepaid plan with the carrier.

After the implementation of this rule, Bell Canada initially refused to offer unlocks for users who were not customers of the carrier (in contrast to Rogers and Telus Communications), but reversed course in February 2018 due to public backlash. In a filing to the CRTC in August 2018, Bell also stated that it had begun to reimplement SIM locks on unsold phones as an anti-theft and safety measure (the phones are unlocked during the activation process when sold to a customer), citing increases in theft from store stocks since the implementation of the prohibition.

Under the original version of the Wireless Code implemented 2013, carriers were required to offer unlocks no later than 90 calendar days from the start of a contract for subsidized devices, or immediately upon purchase of an unsubsidized device. The Code, however, did not expressly prohibit carriers from charging an unlock fee.

Prior to the introduction of the Wireless Code, New Democratic Party MP Bruce Hyer first attempted to mandate SIM unlocking at the end of cell phone contracts when he introduced a private member's bill entitled the Cell Phone Freedom Act in 2010. The act would not have banned SIM locking but would have required wireless carriers to unlock phones at no charge at the end of a cell phone contract. The bill was introduced in two sessions of parliament but failed to pass either time.

=== China ===
Under a regulation enacted by the Ministry of Industry and Information Technology, locking phones to a specific carrier is prohibited if other carriers are also using the same type of network technology. Therefore, all phones approved to be sold in China are never locked to begin with regardless of whether the consumer purchased the phone under a contract or not. However, since all three Chinese carriers each uses a different network technology after the adoption of 3G, carriers started to ask phone manufacturers to disable support for network technologies not used by such carrier even if the phone has been originally designed to be capable of supporting those network technologies. Such a move does not result in violation of the ban on phone locking. For example, an iPhone 6 was designed to be capable of supporting LTE FDD, LTE TD, CDMA, and WCDMA technologies but China Mobile reached a deal with Apple to create a special model for China Mobile in addition to the off-contract retail model sold by Apple and third party vendors with the capability to support LTE FDD, CDMA, WCDMA, which are the technologies not used by China Mobile, disabled, effectively making such special contract model incompatible with the 3G and 4G networks of other carriers even though such phones are never locked.

=== Colombia ===
Starting October 1, 2011, all the mobile telephone services providers, must sell to all users unlocked devices and provide free of charge support to unlock previously sold devices. This regulation was ordered to enable mobile number portability and to facilitate the reduction on costs ordered simultaneously.

=== Chile ===
Since 1 January 2012, newly sold phones must be unlocked. Previously bought locked phones had to be unlocked for free. The regulation was put in place in order to implement mobile number portability. However, the law only requires phones to be usable with all Chilean providers. It does not cover international unlocking for use outside Chile, so users may have to pay for the unlocking service.

A new related issue is present since 23 September 2017, every IMEI have to be registered so the phone works in the country. For local carriers, they do the process, but to use a phone from outside the country, each user has to register it. IMEI Registration.

=== Croatia ===
In Croatia, for devices bought on contract, the mobile operator must provide the unlock code on the user's request free of charge. Such request can be made immediately after buying the phone, and the operator has a 15-day period to fulfill the request. For devices bought on a prepaid plan, the user has to wait at least 12 months before submitting such request.

=== Denmark ===
The carrier can choose to bind contracts up to 6 months from the contract's start. Many of the carriers choose not to lock the phones. Only Hi3G ("3") lock their phones, but can only do so for six months. If the phone needs to be unlocked within the first six months, the carrier can charge DKK 500 (~ €67) for the unlock. After six months, the carrier is obliged by law to unlock the phone free of charge. But the consumer needs to contact the original supplier, and provide the IMEI and original phone number for which the phone was sold.

=== Ecuador ===
Although there is no specific law preventing SIM locking, as of December 2009 Ecuador's two biggest carriers, Porta and Movistar, unlock phones previously sold by them, without charge.

=== European Union ===
Countries in the European Union (EU) each have their own legislation on SIM locking, but must comply with the EU Unfair Commercial Practices Directive (Directive 2005/29/EC of 2005). As noted above, this directive has been successfully applied in Belgium to overturn that country's previous ban on bundling phones with contracts. However, carriers in many countries in the EU do not necessarily associate a phone's SIM lock status to the customer's tie-in contract status.

=== Finland ===
In Finland, carriers are not allowed to sell SIM-locked GSM phones, nor are they allowed to offer tie-in sales on GSM equipment. Under Finnish law, a tie-in sale is defined as selling the equipment for a discounted price contingent on the consumer also acquiring a new service contract from the seller. Under the terms of a provisional exception, valid from 2006 until 2009, tie-in sales were permitted with 3G handsets, and 3G equipment which is purchased under such tie-in sales may be SIM-locked. The SIM lock must be removed free of charge at the conclusion of the tie-in contract, within a maximum duration of 2 years. In 2008, the Finnish government was preparing to extend the exception, and at the same time, was considering reducing the duration of tie-in contracts to one year.

=== France ===
In France, SIM locks are not prohibited. However, the mobile operator must inform the consumer of the existence of a SIM lock, and the subscriber has the right to request that the lock be removed at any time. No later than three months after the subscription of the contract, the mobile operator must "systematically and free of charge" provide the subscriber with a procedure to deactivate the SIM lock. Proposal to shorten the time that operators may charge a fee for removing the SIM lock prior from six-month to the three-month deadline.

=== Germany ===
In Germany, there does not appear to be any effective law regulating SIM locking. For example, the iPhone was initially offered for sale in Germany exclusively through T-Mobile, and it was locked to T-Mobile's network. They began to provide unlocking codes for that phone after they were sued by Vodafone and a temporary injunction was issued requiring T-Mobile to do so. Vodafone's injunction was later overturned, and the iPhone is again available exclusively locked to T-Mobile. While T-Mobile Germany told the court that they would unlock the iPhone after the contract, they were doing it voluntarily.

While SIM locking is legal, a court ruled in 2012 that providers must clearly inform potential customers about the SIM lock.

As of 2015, usually only prepaid mobile phones are sold with a SIM lock. Phones sold with a contract stipulating monthly payments are not typically locked (as the monthly payments are due no matter what network the phone is used on). Also, most providers will unlock the phone on demand. Usually a fee is charged during the first two years after purchase; afterwards the unlocking is free. As of 2022, new phones are rarely distributed with a SIM lock; old phones however may still be locked.

=== Honduras ===
In Honduras, there is a general law applicable to all consumer relations engaged in the national territory and provided by natural or legal persons, public or private. This law is called "Ley de Proteccion al Consumidor" or "Consumer Protection Act of Honduras", approved by Legislative Decree No.24-2008, and it regulates the activities of any goods and services providers stating the principles that they must follow in order to operate in this country.

Article 20 of this law states the prohibitions that sellers are obliged to abide when selling a good or providing a service to people. Paragraph 7 of this article states that it is prohibited to a provider to "place seals, adhesives, duct tapes or analogous mechanisms, which prevent the consumer to make free use of the product, except those mechanisms used by the manufacturer for warranty purposes".

Even though the existence of this law, local carriers continue to apply SIM restrictions to the phones they sell. For example, the iPhone is sold by Claro in Honduras and is SIM-locked. which suggests that this general consumer protection law does not prohibit SIM locking of cell phones

=== Hong Kong ===
In Hong Kong, carriers are not allowed to SIM-lock a phone for the sole purpose of tying customers to their network. But Hong Kong carriers can SIM-lock a phone to protect the handset subsidy, to enforce mobile plan contracts or to protect from theft. After the initial purchase subsidy has been recovered, or the full cost of the equipment has been paid up under a rental or installment agreement, the carrier must provide a detailed procedure for unlocking the equipment free of charge upon request.

=== India ===
SIM locking is not common in India. Initially, each state in India had a different mobile network operator and roaming across states was prohibitive. It was cheaper to change the SIM card than pay high roaming charges. The number of inter-state travelers demanded unlocked phones. Usually, phones and SIM cards are sold separately. Mobile phone manufacturers sell phones directly to customers rather than through network operators. Dual SIM phones are quite common in use, with users choosing to make calls using a cheaper operator suitable for the particular call and time of the day from a Dual SIM phone without even switching it off. This along with other factors, encouraged competition among network operators and brought down the mobile phone call charges in from the initial ₹32 (US$0.75) in 1996 to ₹0.50 (US$0.005 approx.) in 2011. The rates still differ from one service provider to another and across different tariff schemes provided by the same operator. Telecom Regulatory Authority of India (TRAI) is the independent regulator of the telecommunications business in India, established to check call rates and resolve all communication related issues and holds the upper hand in fixing call rates.

=== Israel ===
According to the Arrangements Law passed on December 29, 2010, Israeli carriers are banned from locking handsets sold by them, and are obligated to unlock any handset previously sold at no charge.

=== Italy ===
Italy has SIM locking laws requiring that carriers must specify the amount of subsidies, and allow subscribers to obtain unlocking codes after nine months by paying half of the listed subsidies. After 18 months, the SIM lock must be removed.

=== Japan ===
Japan's Ministry of Internal Affairs and Communications has legislated that all smartphones and tablets released after May 1, 2015, by NTT DoCoMo, au/Okinawa Cellular and SoftBank Mobile (the three major carriers in Japan) must be sold without a SIM lock upon request from customers and without any cost to the customer involved. Before that, from 2011 until 2015, only NTT DoCoMo and au/Okinawa Cellular would remove the SIM lock from phones with a SIM unlock function after the phone is kept or used at least six months after purchase.

=== Monaco ===
In Monaco, the partially state-owned communications mobile company Monaco Telecom does not sell SIM-locked phones. As there is no competition, consumers usually buy standard mobile phones that are not locked to any specific carrier.

=== Netherlands ===
Dutch mobile carriers have an agreement with the Netherlands' telecom regulator, OPTA, to establish a code of conduct with respect to SIM locking — specifically, unlocking fees can be charged within the first 12 months and SIM lock cannot last longer than 12 months.

In a 2002 letter to the Dutch Secretary of State of Economic Affairs, OPTA stated that the telecom regulator has decided to start working on the formalization of the voluntary code of conduct into legislation. However, a 2006 report written by the Dutch Ministry of Economic Affairs, stated that competition in the Dutch mobile market is sufficient and the formalization of the voluntary code of conduct into legislation is not needed. Thus there are no SIM locking laws in the Netherlands.

=== New Zealand ===
Locking was planned in New Zealand before May 2008 when Vodafone New Zealand announced they would begin locking handsets. The company had planned to charge $50 to unlock them, but then relented. It is speculated that the intention to lock was prompted by Telecom New Zealand building their new mobile network based on UMTS technology, allowing handsets to change networks for the first time. Until that point in time, Telecom's network (the only other mobile network at that time) was based on CDMA technology, meaning that it was not possible to change networks. 2degrees were also building a mobile network based on UMTS at this time. After pressure from the Commerce Commission, Vodafone relented on its locking policy, and will unlock any locked phones for free once they have been owned for nine months. A person can pay to have it unlocked prior to this.

Following speculation of a new lower cost, MNVO of Telecom XT details were leaked regarding the Skinny Mobile Network, which would SIM lock handsets.

As of 2015, Vodafone, Spark, Skinny, and 2Degrees all charged a $30 unlock fee for phones owned for less than 9 months. As of 2020, Spark charges a $30 unlock fee for phones owned for less than 9 months, unless the customer is on a Pay Monthly 24 Month Plan. 2Degrees dropped its fees for unlocking phones.

=== Norway ===
Phones sold with a subscription are usually SIM locked to Norwegian carriers. The fee varies depending on how long it has been since a person purchased their mobile phone. After 12 months, one can enter the operator lock code themselves without paying for it.

=== Pakistan ===
Ufone has started SIM Locking with the release of its new smartphone named Smart U5 developed by Emitac Services, UAE. U5 comes SIM locked to Ufone only. No other SIM can be used on the U5.

=== Peru ===
According to OSIPTEL Peru's telecom regulator, article 23 of the Terms of use, mobile carriers can sell phones locked for a lower price for 12, 18 or 24-month contracts, but also must sell unlocked devices for the full price. The same article dictates the customer can request the unlock code for free after 12 months from the purchase date, no matter if the contract is still in place. The sole exception is if the customer cancels the contract before its end and pays the remaining cost, at which point the customer can request the device be unlocked at any time. OSIPTEL plans to reduce the time customers must wait to remove their SIM locks to 6 months.

=== Portugal ===
A 2006 study sponsored by the Portugal regulator, ANACOM, on handset subsidies and SIM locking concluded that there are no special regulatory concerns on offering subsidized SIM-locked equipment in exchange for signing a contract tying a customer to a particular network. Network providers are allowed to apply SIM locks as they see fit, and they may voluntarily remove them if they choose to do so. In the paper, the author stated that the average unlocking fee charged by Portuguese carriers is 90-100 euros. A recently approved law requires network operators to unlock a device free of charge if the respective contract has already expired (But they refuse to do so charging at least 10 euros). It also establishes limits to the fees that operators may charge to unlock a device while it is still under contract.

=== Romania ===
Romanian telecom regulator ANCOM signed a code of conduct with several Romanian carriers providing that as of September 1, 2009 mobile operators selling handsets locked within their own network have to inform clients whether the handset is locked and provide unlocking upon request. It is "self-regulation" by the carriers to prevent the regulator from actually imposing regulations on them. If the handset is not purchased together with other electronic communications services, the mobile telephony operator that sells it will bear the unlocking costs and will not bind the terminal unlocking by the purchase of other services or by the payment of other fees.

If the handset is purchased as part of a promotional package or at a preferential price and the customer requires the unlocking before the expiry of the minimum period provided in the contract for communications services concluded with the operator, the customer will have to pay both the unlocking fee and the penalty for the anticipated unlocking of the handset. The price charged to unlock handsets will not exceed the costs of this operation and operators are obliged to meet unlocking requests within 15 days.

=== Russia ===
SIM locking is not common in Russia, but they have huge potentials to sell unlocked phones. Most mobile phones sold in Russia doesn't have extensive bundlings, customizations as well as the carrier-specific bloatware. Beeline-branded phones are always locked to their network operator.

=== Serbia ===
In telecommunication contracts it is frequent the practice to lock the use of a sim card of one operator with a phone acquired through the same mobile operator. Obstructing the unlocking of the phone may be illegal if the consumer is entitled to it.

=== Singapore ===
In 1997, Singapore's then-telecommunications regulator, Telecommunication Authority of Singapore (now Infocomm Media Authority of Singapore) enforced a legislation where telcos (Singtel, StarHub, M1, Circles.Life, MyRepublic, TPG Telecom and Zero1) are not allowed to SIM-lock devices, such as phones, tablets and smartwatches that are imported and sold in Singapore. In August 1997, TAS warned at least one operator, M1, for selling SIM-locked phones.

=== Spain ===
In 1998, the then-Spanish telecom regulator, Tribunal de Defensa de la Competencia (now Comisión Nacional de los Mercados y la Competencia), saw that Spanish mobile carriers already provided unlocking codes voluntarily for a fee within the first 12 months and for free after 12 months, so it decided not to establish any legal framework in Spain. CMT has not revisited this decision since then, therefore there are no SIM-locking laws in Spain.

=== Sweden ===
In Sweden, carriers are required to unlock handsets after 12 months since purchase. This applies both to on-contract and pay as you go phones. All carriers will charge a fee of 300 SEK (approximately $45) or 350 SEK (approximately $50), depending on carrier, to unlock the handset. However, as of 2016, most carriers have stopped locking phones altogether.

=== Switzerland ===
SIM locking may be particularly common in Switzerland. Swisscom began lifting SIM lock since July 2013. Sunrise prepaid mobile phones have a SIM lock for 2 years from purchase.

=== Thailand ===
Thailand is also another country that forbids outright SIM locking and as a result, no phones are sold in the market are subsidized by carriers. Up until recently mobile phone manufacturers have their own store fronts and mobile carriers are only the service providers.

=== Turkey ===
SIM locking is forbidden by the regulatory authority in Turkey since 2013. There are conflicting and varying reports about former practices of SIM locking by operators. A newspaper column from 1997 criticizes Telsim's SIM locking policy: "... you cannot quit Telsim until the phone becomes waste, the only way to quit Telsim is buying a new phone." Turkcell's SIM locking policy has been subject to a lawsuit in 2001, resulting in Turkcell being fined. BlackBerry phones sold by Turkcell and Vodafone were SIM locked, however, could be unlocked on request without any conditions. Yet, the SIM locking practice was only confined to phones sold by operators and it is not clear if operators enforced SIM locking on the phones sold by them tightly or not and if the practice was widespread. Phones sold by other channels were strictly unlocked. Three major mobile network operators, Turkcell, Türk Telekom and Vodafone still offer phones with long term contracts, however these phones are sold unlocked.

=== United Kingdom ===
In the United Kingdom, mobile phone network providers are not obliged to provide unlocking, even after the end of the contract. Ofcom, UK's telecom regulator, allowed 3 to sell a mobile phone with the SIM card permanently superglued to the phone. Most operators offer some form of unlocking service, depending on the state of the contract and the model of phone, but usually for a charge. The full Oftel 2002 SIM-lock position paper specifies that there is no SIM-locking law in the UK; the regulator wants only "consumer awareness". The examples within the position paper are just "examples" of current carrier practices for illustration purposes, but do not reflect any official Oftel regulation. The main networks often agree to unlock handsets for a charge, either at the end of a contract or, for prepaid handsets, after several months. Some Blackberry handsets supplied by Vodafone (e.g., Storm) are examples of a UK carrier not offering unlocking codes. As of April 2011 O2 will unlock any of their pay-monthly phones for free, even if they're still in contract, with the exception of handsets made exclusively for them, such as their Palm devices. Carphone Warehouse, one of the largest UK phone retailers, offers unlocked phones with most PAYG deals. As of January 1, 2014, all phones sold by 3 UK are unlocked. Phones bought before this date will be unlocked for free.

On 17 December 2019, Ofcom announced that it would explore a mandate banning SIM locking. On 27 October 2020, The UK's mobile networks are to be forbidden from selling phones locked to their services from December 2021.

=== United States ===
One of the two American GSM carriers, T-Mobile, will unlock handsets for those with active account in good standing for at least 40 days and no unlock code request in the last 90 days. The other, AT&T Mobility, is required to do so upon request (with some exceptions and requirements) after ninety days of active service under the terms of a class action settlement. Prior to the settlement, AT&T would usually do so once one has concluded their contract, and in some other situations. AT&T had in the past stated that it would not unlock iPhones under any circumstances, regardless of the legality of doing so, even after customers are out of contract. However, AT&T has since announced that starting April 8, 2012, it will begin unlocking off-contract iPhones, provided that the customer's account is in good standing. AT&T also has an unannounced policy of unlocking iPhones for United States service members who are deployed overseas –even if they are still under contract.

Before carriers began voluntarily providing unlock codes for all phone models, in 2010 the Electronic Frontier Foundation (EFF) successfully convinced the United States Copyright Office to allow an exemption to the general prohibition on circumvention of copyright protection systems under the Digital Millennium Copyright Act of 1998 for unlocking of phones through user self-help (sometimes referred to as "hacking"). This exemption has become less important now that most carriers are voluntarily providing unlock codes.

According to a ruling effective October 28, 2012, it will be illegal to unlock phones purchased 90 days after this date or later without the carrier's permission. In other words, users can already unlock phones they already own, and phones purchased before January 29, 2013, but phones purchased after this point can only be unlocked with the carrier's permission.

In March 2013, the Obama administration and the Federal Communications Commission said consumers should also be able to switch carriers and keep their actual phones.

On August 1, 2014, President Obama signed into law the Unlocking Consumer Choice and Wireless Competition Act (S. 517; 113th Congress), a bill legalizing unlocking cellphones in the US. The bill passed in the United States Senate on July 15, 2014, and in the United States House of Representatives on July 25, 2014.

Sprint agreed to allow domestic unlocking on all mobile devices launched after February 15, 2015.

It is possible to buy unlocked phones in the U.S. Some online retailers sell phones that come unlocked from the manufacturer, that is, they were never locked in the first place.

== See also ==
- Regional lockout
- Android rooting
- International Mobile Equipment Identity (IMEI)
- Jailbreak (computer science)
- iOS jailbreaking
- Vendor lock-in
- Bootloader unlocking
- Turbo SIM
