= David Hamilton (Canadian politician) =

Canadian mayor (born 1949)

5th Mayor of Thunder Bay
- In office 1991–1997
- Preceded by: Jack Masters
- Succeeded by: Ken Boshcoff

Personal details
- Born: c. April 9, 1949; Fort William, Ontario
- Spouse: Linda Hamilton

David Hamilton (born April 9, 1949) served as mayor of the city of Thunder Bay, Ontario from 1992 to 1997, and later served as an administrator in three American county governments.

Hamilton was born in Fort William, Ontario to James Murray Hamilton from Paris, Ontario and Martha Alice James from Kansas City, Missouri, who married in 1944.
