= Subsidy Password =

The term, Subsidy Password, is used by Motorola and other handset manufacturers to refer to the 8-digit code (or 16-digit code for phones such as the Motorola K1) unlock code necessary to remove the operator lock (also known as subsidy lock) from cell phones. This code is randomly assigned to individual cell phones by the OEM on request of the mobile service operator and prevents the use of a particular phone on a cellular network other than that for which the phone was originally sold.

== Justification for use ==
The term "subsidy" refers to the subsidization of cell phones sold to customers that purchase mobile phones as part of a contract with the mobile service operator. Many network operators provide these subsidies as an incentive for users to sign extended contracts, and use the subsidy lock as a means of protecting their investment. The installation of such locks means that users often are forced to purchase a different phone if they decide to switch their network (of advantage to both the OEM manufacturer and cellular service provider).

CDMA cellular providers that use subsidy locks on their handsets:

Ntelos, Cricket, Sprint, Quest, Philippines Cellular, SureWest, Telus & Bell Mobility (Not a complete list)

GSM: (SIM unlock) globe smart sun

Alltel or Verizon Wireless do not use any type of subsidy locks on their CDMA phones. Default Code:000000 or 123456 or 654321

Prepaid cellphones from Alltel & Verizon Wireless come locked from the store, but Verizon Wireless prepaid cellphones can be unlocked with a call to Verizon.

== Unlocking services and software ==
As a result of the lack of open access to the Subsidy Password database, a number of online services have grown around providing alternative unlocking software. The methods used to unlock cell phones vary although most involve reading the code from the phone and resetting it.

== Legal concerns ==
=== United States ===
Network carriers will sometimes agree to unlock their customers' phones upon request. While one could consider that the Digital Millennium Copyright Act brings the legality of such applications under question in the United States, recent legal cases such as Lexmark Int'l v. Static Control Components have confirmed that the use of software to reprogram such phones is not illegal. This is particularly true since unlocking applications increases compatibility with alternative networks, promotes positive competition and allows customers with greater freedom to use the phones that they own. In 2010, the Librarian of Congress exempted unlocking phones from the DMCA.

=== Other countries ===
There are no legal prohibitions to unlocking in the United Kingdom or Canada.

== See also ==
- Digital Millennium Copyright Act#Anti-circumvention exemptions
- Mobile phone
- SIM lock
