= Turbo SIM =

IMSI spoofing device

Turbo SIM card (also known as TurboSIM or Unlock Chip) is considered to be the forerunner of a large family of "Dual SIM" devices (X-SIM, R-SIM, HyperCard, HyperSIM, China3GPP, StealthSim, MagicSIM, etc.) that piggyback on a mobile telephone SIM card to alter its normal operation. It was introduced on December 1, 2004 by BLADOX, located in Prague, Czech Republic.

It is a very thin device with a 9mm by 9mm microprocessor mounted in the top right corner, with maker's name BLADOX in gold letters on its black PCB. It is pressed on top of a normal SIM card (with some plastic cut off) in such a way that it is still small enough to be inserted into the SIM card slot of any GSM phone. Without the TurboSIM, the original SIM card is usable as before.

The Turbo SIM is claimed to work with any GSM mobile phone produced since 1998, and can be used to add new functionality such as larger SMS archives to some phones. However, dual SIM technologies have been found not to work with some phones.

This device, and those like it, use a small microcontroller (the original Turbo SIM used an Atmel ATmega128) to intercept traffic between the cell phone and the original SIM card, and modify this traffic based on programming stored in the microcontroller.

The most common purpose of the Turbo SIM is to spoof the IMSI number and authentication key (Ki) supplied by the SIM card to the network, allowing phones locked to use only a particular network (SIM locked) such as the Apple iPhone, and more recently NTT DoCoMo and SoftBank phones, to be used on any mobile network with which they are technically compatible.

== Legality ==
The legal status of using a TurboSIM or an Unlock Chip is affected by laws regarding circumvention of digital locks, such as laws protecting digital rights management (DRM) mechanisms. However, many countries do not have such laws, and some countries have laws including exceptions for the use of TurboSIM.

=== Canada ===
There had been several efforts from 2008 to 2011 to amend the Copyright Act (Bill C-60, Bill C-61, and Bill C-32) to prohibit tampering with digital locks, along with initial proposals for C-11 that were more restrictive, but those bills were set aside.

In November 2012, Canada amended its Copyright Act with new provisions prohibiting tampering with DRM protection, with exceptions including software interoperability.

== See also ==
- SIM lock
- iOS jailbreaking
- iOS version history
- PP Jailbreak
- Cydia
