= Climate change in British Columbia =

Overview of climate change in the Canadian province of British Columbia

Climate change in the Canadian province of British Columbia affects various environments and industries, including agriculture. The Government of British Columbia has enacted several goals to reduce carbon emissions, though these have been adjusted over time due to not being met. Investments in wind energy projects are among the remedies thus far enacted. The impact of climate change in British Columbia includes concerns over rising sea levels and warmer air temperatures negatively impacting the province's ecosystem.

== Greenhouse gas emissions ==
British Columbia has announced many ambitious policies to address climate change mitigation, particularly through its Climate Action Plan, released in 2008. It has set legislated greenhouse gas reduction targets of 33% below 2007 levels by 2020 and 80% by 2050.

British Columbia's provincial public sector organizations became the first in North America to be considered carbon neutral in 2010, partly by purchasing carbon offsets. The Clean Energy Vehicles Program provides incentives for the purchase of approved clean energy vehicles and for charging infrastructure installation. There has been action across sectors including financing options and incentives for building retrofits, a Forest Carbon Offset Protocol, a Renewable and Low Carbon Fuel Standard, and landfill gas management regulation.

British Columbia's GHG emissions have been going down, and in 2012 (based on 2010 data) British Columbia declared it was within reach of meeting its interim target of a 6% reduction below 2007 levels by 2012. GHG emissions went down by 4.5% between 2007 and 2010, and consumption of all the main fossil fuels are down in British Columbia as well while GDP and population have both been growing.

In 2018 it was announced that the province "after stalling on sustained climate action for several years, admitted they could not meet their 2020 target", the 33% reduction target had stalled at 6.5%. Provincially British Columbia is the second-largest consumer of natural gas at 2.3 billion cubic feet per day.

== Impacts of climate change ==
=== Sea level rise ===
Sea levels on British Columbia's North Coast are rising faster than on other parts of the British Columbia coastline.

=== Infrastructure and built environment ===
A 2015 report warned that most dikes would possibly fail under the stress of increased flooding. A 2025 report indicated that new housing built in high risk zones, regarding floods and fires would be highly expensive over time.

=== Ecosystems ===
Climate change is affecting British Columbia's aquatic life due to warmer air and water temperatures, posing a risk to fish due to the increasing temperatures leading to faster metabolism and less energy.

=== Heatwaves ===
Heatwaves led to increased flash flooding in 2021 due to a reduction in the vegetation that would absorb the rainfall.

== Response ==
In December 2024, the British Columbia government approved 9 wind energy products, providing 5 TWh of energy annually, which would be enough to power "500,0000" homes.

=== Legislation ===
==== Climate Change Accountability Act, 2007 (previously known as the Greenhouse Gas Reduction Targets Act, 2007 until 2018) ====
Climate Change Accountability Act

Legislative Assembly of British Columbia
- Citation: SBC 2007, c 42
- Assented to: 2007-11-29

Keywords
- emissions targets
- Status: In force (amended)

In 2007, the British Columbia government set a target to reduce emissions by 16% by 2025, with further targets for 2030, 2040, 2050.

By 2010, emissions in British Columbia had increased by 0.9% from 2007. In 2012, emissions had increased 21.7% compared to 1990 levels and decreased by 6.5% compared to 2007 levels.

==== Carbon Tax Act, 2008 ====
British Columbia has had a carbon tax since 2008.

BC's revenue neutral carbon tax is the first of its kind in North America. It was introduced at $10/tonne of CO_{2}eq in 2008 and has risen by $5/tonne annual increases until it reached $30/tonne in 2012. In 2021, the carbon tax increased from $40/tonne to $45/tonne, and is scheduled to reach $50/tonne in 2022. It is required in legislation that all revenues from the carbon tax are returned to British Columbians through tax cuts in other areas.

==== Greenhouse Gas Reduction Targets Amendment Act, 2018 ====
Greenhouse Gas Reduction Targets Amendment Act, 2018

Legislative Assembly of British Columbia
- Citation: SBC 2018, c 32
- Assented to: 2018-05-31

Keywords
- emissions targets
- Status: In force (amended)

In 2018, the British Columbia government dropped its commitments to meet the 2030 goal, because the 2020 goal seemed unlikely to be met.

The act maintains commitments to the 2050 goal.

Emissions in British Columbia reached a peak of 65.0 million tonnes, 7% higher than 2007 levels.

==== Climate Change Accountability Amendment Act, 2019 ====
Climate Change Accountability Amendment Act

Legislative Assembly of British Columbia
- Citation: SBC 2007, c 42
- Assented to: 2019-11-28

Keywords
- emissions targets
- Status: In force

In 2019 the government announced plans to put requirement on the plans that would be released under the Act to have interim targets.

In 2023, a court case, alleging that the government had not met the obligations under the amended act, was dismissed on the basis that the legislation did not specify.that the government was required to provide "quantitative data".

The history of British Columbia not meeting its targets led to criticism by the Union of B.C. Indian Chiefs for continuing to "prop up" fossil fuels.

==== Zero-Emission Vehicles Act, 2019 ====
Zero-Emission Vehicles Act, 2019

Legislative Assembly of British Columbia
- Citation: SBC 2019, c 29
- Assented to: 30-05-2019

Keywords
- emissions targets
- Status: In force (amended)

In 2019 the government announced that cars, trucks sold by 2040 to be zero emission.

In 2022, provincial sales tax stopped being charged on zero emissions vehicles, which in combination with the Act meant that British Columbia was "at the forefront" in terms of ZEV ownership.

==== Low Carbon Fuels Act, 2022 ====
Low Carbon Fuels Act, 2022

Legislative Assembly of British Columbia
- Citation: SBC 2022, c 22
- Assented to: 2022-06-02

Keywords
- emissions targets
- Status: In force (amended)

British Columbia implemented stricter rules for low-carbon fuels for the aviation sector. Beginning in 2028, 1% of jet fuel would have to be sustainable aviation fuel. The rule applies to jet fuel imported to the province or manufactured in the province, regardless of the destination of the flight.

==== Zero-Emission Vehicles Amendment Act, 2023 ====
Zero-Emission Vehicles Act, 2019

Legislative Assembly of British Columbia
- Citation: SBC 2019, c 29
- Assented to: 30-05-2019

Keywords
- emissions targets
- Status: In force

In 2023, the government moved its 2040 target to 2035.

The Energy Minister Josie Osborne said the proposed amendments would make it easier for consumers to choose electric cars.

The legislation was criticised by the pcar dealership association, who suggested that a more flexible approach would be better.

== See also ==
- Climate change in Canada
