= Jack Masters =

Canadian politician (1931–2024)

4th Mayor of Thunder Bay
- In office 1986–1991
- Preceded by: Walter Assef
- Succeeded by: David Hamilton

MP for Thunder Bay—Nipigon
- In office 1980–1984
- Preceded by: Bob Andras
- Succeeded by: Ernie Epp

Personal details
- Born: John Gerald Mastrangelo; 27 September 1931 Fort William, Ontario, Canada
- Died: 5 January 2024 (aged 92) Thunder Bay, Ontario, Canada
- Party: Liberal

John Gerald Masters (born John Gerald Mastrangelo, 27 September 1931 – 5 January 2024) was a Canadian politician. He served as mayor of the city of Thunder Bay, Ontario, and as a federal Member of Parliament.

== Biography ==
John Gerald Mastrangelo was born in Fort William, Ontario on 27 September 1931. He was elected to the House of Commons of Canada as a Liberal for the constituency of Thunder Bay—Nipigon in the 1980 federal election and served as the parliamentary secretary to the Minister of State (Mines) and the Minister of Communications in the final government of Pierre Trudeau. He was defeated in the 1984 federal election by Ernie Epp. Masters died in Thunder Bay on 5 January 2024, at the age of 92.
