= Richard Xavier Baxter =

Richard Baxter (28 March 1821 – 8 May 1904) was a Roman Catholic priest and a Jesuit who was born in England and emigrated to Upper Canada with his family about 1830.

Baxter entered the newly established Jesuit novitiate in Montreal in 1845 as the order's first English-speaking novice in Canada. (He was also fluent in French, having done classical studies at the Séminaire de Saint-Sulpice in Montreal).

As a pastor, he served predominantly in the Georgian Bay and Lake Superior areas. During the railway construction in the Lake Superior area, he became known as the Apostle of the Railway Builders, providing pastoral services to the camps.

Father Baxter was important in the development of northwestern Ontario's Catholic institutions as well as being a man of the people. He was officially recognized in 1978 with a memorial plaque at St Andrew's Catholic Church, Thunder Bay, Ontario.
