= Claude Eugene Garton =

Canadian botanist and teacher (1907–1996)

Claude Eugene Garton (born February 26, 1907, near Aylmer, Ontario; died January 1, 1996) was a Canadian teacher, field naturalist and botanist; in Thunder Bay. A public school and a herbarium are named after him.

Garton was born on a farm in southern Ontario, and became fascinated by the plant world as a child. He attended high school in Aylmer and St. Thomas, and then attended the London Normal School. After several years of teaching in Essex County, he moved to Port Arthur (later Thunder Bay) where worked first as a teacher and then school principal until his retirement in 1966. He married Evelyn MacGoldrick and they lived in the Current River neighbourhood.

Garton was a founding member of the Thunder Bay Field Naturalists, established in 1933. As a botanist and collector of plants, he led outings with the Field Naturalists, and collected specimens for the Department of Agriculture and the Canadian Museum of Nature. His personal collection of over 10,000 specimens would be donated to Lakehead University in 1967, serving as the nucleus of a new herbarium: Garton was quickly appointed as curator, and the herbarium would be named after him. He was well known for his extensive collecting of specimens across the north shore of Lake Superior, and his organizing of conservation work with the Thunder Bay Field Naturalists.

== Recognition ==
- 1978: Conservation Trophy, Federation of Ontario Naturalists
- 1979: Doctor of Science, Honouris Causa, Lakehead University
- 1979: Citizen of Exceptional Achievement, City of Thunder Bay
- 1985: Honorary Member, Ottawa Field Naturalists Club

== Publications (selection) ==
- Checklist – Vascular Plants of Thunder Bay District, 1984 (revised with Joan Crowe and republished in 1993).
- Ice age relics, arctic and alpine plants: Nature Northwest 41 (1987) 2–7.
- with James H. Soper, David R. Given: Flora of the North Shore of Lake Superior, National Museum of Natural Sciences 1989.
- Botanical Investigation: Pukaskwa National Park, Lakehead University, 1975 (44 pp., unpublished)
