= Ernie Epp =

Canadian historian and former politician

Abram Ernest (Ernie) Epp (born 28 September 1941) is a Canadian historian and former politician. He was a professor of Canadian and environmental history at Lakehead University in Thunder Bay, Ontario from 1978 to 2007. He represented the electoral district of Thunder Bay—Nipigon in the House of Commons of Canada from 1984 to 1988 as a member of the New Democratic Party. He defeated Liberal incumbent Jack Masters in the 1984 Canadian federal election to represent the seat and lost it to Liberal challenger Joe Comuzzi in 1988.

As a historian, his publications include From Rivalry to Unity: A History of Thunder Bay (1995) and The North American Fur Trade: Pivotal Interpretations (1995).

Epp was born in Winnipeg, Manitoba, Canada.

== General references ==
- Ernie Epp – Parliament of Canada biography

Parliament of Canada
Preceded by Jack Masters	Member of Parliament for Thunder Bay—Nipigon; 1984–1988	Succeeded by Joe Comuzzi
