= Joe Comuzzi =

Canadian lawyer and politician (1933–2021)

The Honourable Joe Comuzzi PC

Member of Parliament for Thunder Bay—Superior North Thunder Bay—Nipigon, 1988–2000
- In office 1988–2008
- Preceded by: Ernie Epp
- Succeeded by: Bruce Hyer

Personal details
- Born: Joseph Robert Comuzzi; April 5, 1933 Fort William, Ontario, Canada
- Died: December 31, 2021 (aged 88) Thunder Bay, Ontario, Canada
- Party: Conservative (after 2007)
- Other political affiliations: Liberal (1988–2007); Independent (2007)
- Spouse: Janet M. Casgrain (died 2014)
- Children: 4
- Profession: Barrister and solicitor, businessman, lawyer

Joseph Robert Comuzzi, PC (April 5, 1933 – December 31, 2021) was a Canadian lawyer and politician who served as a cabinet minister under Prime Minister Paul Martin. He served as a Member of Parliament (MP) from 1988 to 2008, representing Thunder Bay—Nipigon which was renamed Thunder Bay—Superior North in 2000.

== Early life ==
Comuzzi was born in Fort William, Ontario, on April 5, 1933. He studied at the University of Windsor, graduating in 1954 with a Bachelor of Arts degree. Twelve years later, he received the University of Windsor Alumni Award of Merit, the Alumni Association's most prestigious award. After working in the Thunder Bay business community for 24 years, he went back to his alma mater and obtained a law degree in 1980. He also served as a school representative on the Lakehead Board of Education.

== Political career ==
Comuzzi entered federal politics in 1988, running in the election that year for the Liberal Party of Canada. He was elected to the House of Commons, representing the riding of Thunder Bay—Superior North. As an opposition MP, he served as chair of the Standing Committee on Transport and a member of the Standing Joint Committee on the Scrutiny of Regulations. During his tenure as an MP, Comuzzi advocated for key issues specific to his riding: Great Lakes transportation and water quality, the pulp and paper industry, the softwood lumber dispute, grain transportation, mining, small business, health care and the local economy. He also served in various leadership capacities pertaining to transportation and industry. His views on gun registry spending and official bilingualism were at odds with the Liberals. His call to review the latter policy on its 25th anniversary in 1998 drew the ire of Prime Minister Jean Chrétien.

Comuzzi was appointed Minister of State responsible for the Federal Economic Development Initiative for Northern Ontario (FedNor) on December 12, 2003. While Minister of State, he was forced to apologize for remarks about Quebecers when, in commenting on the Sponsorship scandal, he stated, "I guess that's how they do politics there." He served as co-chair of the Canada–United States Inter-Parliamentary Group from December 2003 until the following July, and again from February 2005 to June 2006.

An opponent of same-sex marriage in Canada, Comuzzi resigned from cabinet on June 28, 2005, so that he could be free of a two-line party whip and oppose Bill C-38. He was eventually expelled from the Liberal caucus for pledging to support the Conservative budget on March 21, 2007. He stated that his support for the budget was due to "a single issue that's of absolute critical importance to all the people in Thunder Bay and northwestern Ontario, and that's the cancer research centre". He subsequently joined the Conservative Party on June 26 that year. On September 5, 2008, Comuzzi announced that he would retire from politics and not seek another term in the following federal election.

== Personal life ==
Comuzzi was married to Janet M. Casgrain until her death in 2014. Together, they had four children. He died on December 31, 2021, at the age of 88.
