= Bruce Hyer =

Canadian politician (born 1946)

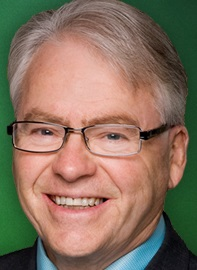
- Hyer in 2015

Deputy Leader of the Green Party of Canada
- In office January 27, 2014 – March 19, 2018 Serving with Daniel Green
- Leader: Elizabeth May
- Succeeded by: Jo-Ann Roberts

Member of Parliament for Thunder Bay—Superior North
- In office 2008–2015
- Preceded by: Joe Comuzzi
- Succeeded by: Patty Hajdu

Personal details
- Born: Bruce Tolhurst Hyer; August 6, 1946 (age 79) Hartford, Connecticut, U.S.
- Party: Green (since 2013)
- Other political affiliations: New Democratic (2004–2012); Independent (2012–2013)
- Spouse: Margaret Wanlin (m. 1993)
- Children: 1
- Profession: Ecologist; businessman

Bruce Tolhurst Hyer (born August 6, 1946) is a Canadian politician, businessman, and ecologist. He is the former deputy leader of the Green Party of Canada and the former Member of Parliament for Thunder Bay—Superior North. Hyer was elected in the 2008 federal election, and re-elected with a wider margin in the 2011 federal election; on both occasions while standing for the New Democratic Party.

== Early life ==
Hyer was born in Hartford, Connecticut, United States in 1946. He graduated in 1964 from Hall High School, and was a Republican at the time. In Willimantic, Connecticut he worked as a police officer, using his knowledge of Spanish to conduct outreach to the Hispanic community. After graduating from Central Connecticut State University, Hyer helped to create the Connecticut State Department of Environmental Protection, where as a Senior Environmental Analyst, he worked on water and air pollution, land use planning, and was in charge of pesticide registration. He played a key role in banning DDT and many other of the "dirty dozen" chlorinated pesticides, and ended the spraying of non-selective chemical insecticides in unmanaged forests. At age 29, he moved to Canada to live in the wilderness 40 km (25 miles) west of Armstrong Station, Ontario. Hyer lived for two years mostly off the land in the Canadian wilderness; first in a tipi and later in a log cabin he constructed himself. In 1978 he moved to Thunder Bay, where he started a retail outdoor and camera store called WildWaters Wilderness Shop. He married Margaret Wanlin in 1993. Their son Michael was born in 1995.

== Early career ==
Hyer has had a number of vocations and avocations, including consultant, wilderness guide, log building and whitewater canoeing instructor, biologist, teacher (high school, college, university), bush pilot, and land use planner.

From the beginning of his days in Canada, Hyer acted as a biologist and entrepreneur in the Thunder Bay area, operating an ecotourist company with offices in Thunder Bay and Armstrong. As one of the early tourist operators in the area, Hyer also headed the North of Superior Tourism Board for many years. He received a Master of Science degree in Forestry from Lakehead University in 1997 for his scientific work on the effects of human disturbance on woodland caribou. This work was partially supported by Buchanan Forest Products Limited. Throughout this period, Hyer worked as a consultant in biodiversity, wildlife biology, and ecotourism, including travelling to Japan in 2004 to work with the government of Akita Prefecture on the protection and ecotourism planning for of one of Japan's last undammed rivers, the Omonogawa.

== Political career ==
Hyer began his professional political career in 2003. In the 2004 election, Hyer almost doubled the vote share received by the NDP and advanced their standing to second place. In the following election in 2006, Hyer came even closer, falling short of the Liberal incumbent Joe Comuzzi by only 408 votes. In 2008, Hyer was elected to the 40th Canadian Parliament with a 9% lead over the Liberals.

=== First term ===
After taking his seat in October 2008, Hyer started work on climate change legislation. On February 10, 2009, Hyer tabled Bill C-311 the Climate Change Accountability Act (Bill C-311) as his first private member's bill in the House of Commons of Canada. The bill was passed by the House of Commons in a minority Conservative government at 3rd Reading on May 5, 2010 with 149 votes for and 136 votes against. It was defeated on November 16, 2010 by a vote of 43 to 32 in the Conservative-controlled Senate. Other bills Hyer has introduced include Bill C-312 the Made in Canada Act, the Cell Phone Freedom Act and a number of motions including the Northwest Ontario Passenger Rail Motion, which mandates the return of Via Rail service to the north shore of Lake Superior and to Thunder Bay. Hyer served as the NDP's small business and tourism critic from 2008 to 2011.

=== Second term ===
In the 2011 election, Hyer was re-elected with 49.8% of the vote, 7,000 votes more than his nearest opponent. Following his re-election, the issue of the long gun registry was tabled in the House of Commons. As he had promised voters over four elections, Hyer voted in favour of ending the registration of hunting rifles and shotguns, given that all legal firearm owners were already licensed and registered themselves under the Possession and Acquisition Licence (PAL). This move was viewed unfavourably within the NDP, even though firearm registration was not mentioned in party policies or platforms. As a result of his decision, Hyer was stripped of his critic roles and was no longer given the opportunity to speak in the House, although that punishment was then reversed, but his critic role was not restored. On April 23, 2012 Hyer announced he would sit as an independent, which he remained for a year and a half.

=== Green Party ===
On December 13, 2013, Hyer announced that he would join the Green Party of Canada, doubling the number of members the party has in the House of Commons by joining the leader of the party, Elizabeth May. Hyer gave as reasoning for his decision that: the Green Party has the best leader and platform; and that they are the only party in Parliament that is truly democratic, allowing Green MPs to put their constituents and conscience before party control. With his decision, he became the first Green Party MP from Ontario. One year later, on December 13, 2014, Hyer was acclaimed as the Green Party candidate for the Thunder Bay—Superior North riding in the 2015 election. On October 19, 2015, he lost the election to Liberal Party candidate Patty Hajdu, getting only 13.8% of the votes.

== Electoral record ==
2019 Canadian federal election: Thunder Bay—Superior North
Party	Candidate	Votes	%	±%	Expenditures
Liberal	Patty Hajdu	18,502	42.85	-2.14	$94,089.37
Conservative	Frank Pullia	11,036	25.56	+8.13	$33,102.79
New Democratic	Anna Betty Achneepineskum	9,126	21.14	-2.04	$42,426.79
Green	Bruce Hyer	3,639	8.43	-5.37	$23,709.76
People's	Youssef Khanjari	734	1.70	–	$5,389.00
Libertarian	Alexander Vodden	140	0.32	–	$1,783.16
Total valid votes/expense limit		43,177	99.05		
Total rejected ballots		416	0.95		
Turnout		43,593	65.48	-3.22	
Eligible voters		66,579			
Liberal hold		Swing		-5.13	
Source: Elections Canada

2015 Canadian federal election
Party	Candidate	Votes	%	±%
Liberal	Patty Hajdu	20,069	45.0	+28.4
New Democratic	Andrew Foulds	10,339	23.2	-26.6
Conservative	Richard Harvey	7,775	17.4	-12.4
Green	Bruce Hyer	6,155	13.8	+10.8
Independent	Robert Skaf	270	0.6	
Total valid votes		44,608	100.0	

2011 Canadian federal election
Party	Candidate	Votes	%	±%	Expenditures
New Democratic	Bruce Hyer	18,303	49.8%	+12.8	–
Conservative	Richard Harvey	10,932	29.8%	+3.0%	–
Liberal	Yves Fricot	6,107	16.6	-11.7%	–
Green	Scot Kyle	1,115	3.0%	-3.9%	–
Marijuana	Denis Andrew Carrière	266	0.7%	-0.2%	–
Total valid votes		36,723	100.0%		

2008 Canadian federal election
Party	Candidate	Votes	%	±%
New Democratic	Bruce Hyer	13,174	37.0	
Liberal	Don McArthur	10,083	28.3	
Conservative	Bev Sarafin	9,556	26.8	
Green	Brendan Hughes	2,463	6.9	
Marijuana	Denis A. Carrière	327	0.9	
Total valid votes		35,603		

2006 Canadian federal election
Party	Candidate	Votes	%	±%
Liberal	Joe Comuzzi	13,983	36.0%	
New Democratic	Bruce Hyer	13,575	34.9%	
Conservative	Bev Sarafin	8,575	22.1%	
Green	Dawn Kannegiesser	2,241	5.8%	
Marijuana	Denis A. Carrière	487	1.3%	
Total valid votes		38,861		

2004 Canadian federal election
Party	Candidate	Votes
Liberal	Joe Comuzzi	15,022
New Democratic	Bruce Hyer	10,230
Conservative	Bev Sarafin	7,394
Green	Carl Rose	1,614
Marijuana	Denis A. Carrière	645
