= Ruth Tye McKenzie =

Canadian artist (1929–2023)

Ruth Tye McKenzie (1929-2023) was a visual artist and art supply store owner based in Thunder Bay, Ontario.

She was born in Edmonton and educated at the Banff School of Fine Arts and the Ontario College of Art, and lived for some time in Dundas before returning to Thunder Bay. She opened the Painted Turtle Art Shop in 1983, and operated it for 20 years, before selling to new owners. She had intended the Painted Turtle to be a sideline, but it filled a need and became an important site in the Thunder Bay arts community, as it was the only place where quality art supplies could be purchased at the time. Her work has been exhibited in solo and group exhibitions, including retrospectives at the Thunder Bay Art Gallery in 2003 and 2023.

McKenzie is known for her paintings, etchings, and mixed media works. Favourite subjects included Northern Ontario landscapes, and nudes: she frequently mixed these subjects in a series she termed "Nudescapes." According to artist Alison Kendall, "Her desire to avert public objections to nakedness as an overt suggestion of sexuality is accomplished by linking the figure metaphorically to the fecundity of the Northwestern Ontario boreal forest." She was a friend of artist Susan Ross and author Sheila Burnford, and was a member of Lakehead Visual Arts, Artists North of Superior, the Thunder Bay Art Gallery, and Definitely Superior Artist Run Centre.

In 2017, McKenzie was presented with the Lifetime Achievement award at the City of Thunder Bay's Arts and Heritage Awards. Her artwork is in the permanent collections of the Banff School of Fine Arts, the City of Thunder Bay, Confederation College, the Government of Ontario Art Collection, and Lakehead University.
