= Thunder Bay—Superior North (federal electoral district) =

Federal electoral district in Ontario, Canada

Coordinates: 49.85°N 88.85°W

Ontario electoral district
- Interactive map of riding boundaries from the 2025 federal election. Point indicates the city of Thunder Bay.

Federal electoral district
- Legislature: House of Commons
MP
Patty Hajdu
Liberal
- District created: 1976
- First contested: 1979
- Last contested: 2025
- District webpage: profile, map

Demographics
- Population (2019): 82,651
- Electors (2019): 66,579
- Area (km²): 87,965
- Pop. density (per km²): 0.94
- Census division: Thunder Bay District
- Census subdivision(s): Thunder Bay (part), Greenstone, Shuniah, Marathon, Manitouwadge, Terrace Bay, Nipigon, Schreiber, Fort Hope, Red Rock

Thunder Bay—Superior North (French: Thunder Bay—Supérieur-Nord; formerly known as Thunder Bay—Nipigon) is a federal electoral district in Ontario, Canada, that has been represented in the House of Commons of Canada since 1979.

It is in the northwestern part of the province of Ontario. It was created in 1976 as "Thunder Bay—Nipigon" from parts of Port Arthur and Thunder Bay ridings. It was renamed "Thunder Bay—Superior North" in 1997.

It consists of the eastern part of the Territorial District of Thunder Bay including the northern part of the city of Thunder Bay, Ontario.

13.7% of the population of the riding are of Finnish ethnic origin, the highest such percentage in Canada.

This riding lost a fraction of territory to Thunder Bay—Rainy River and gained territory from Algoma—Manitoulin—Kapuskasing during the 2012 electoral redistribution.

== Demographics ==
According to the 2021 Canadian census

Ethnic groups: 76.3% White, 17.3% Indigenous, 2.3% South Asian, 1.0% Black
Languages: 83.7% English, 3.7% French, 1.8% Italian, 1.6% Finnish
Religions: 56.7% Christian (31.6% Catholic, 4.8% United Church, 4.6% Anglican, 4.6% Lutheran, 1.2% Presbyterian, 1.0% Baptist, 8.9% Other), 1.1% Muslim, 39.2% None
Median income: $43,200 (2020)
Average income: $52,950 (2020)

== Geography ==
Thunder Bay—Superior North consists of the part of the Territorial District of Thunder Bay running south from the northern limit of the territorial district, passing through several townships and landmarks such as Dog River, Dog Lake, and the Kaministiquia River, then east to the City of Thunder Bay and the US border. It excludes the part south and east of a line starting from the southwest corner of the Township of Downer, moving west and south through multiple townships to longitude 86°00' W, and then west along the White River to Lake Superior.

== Members of Parliament ==
This riding has elected the following members of Parliament:

Parliament	Years	Member	Party
Thunder Bay—Nipigon; Riding created from Port Arthur and Thunder Bay
31st	1979–1980	Bob Andras	Liberal
32nd	1980–1984	Jack Masters	Liberal
33rd	1984–1988	Ernie Epp	New Democratic
34th	1988–1993	Joe Comuzzi	Liberal
35th	1993–1997	Joe Comuzzi	Liberal
Thunder Bay—Superior North
36th	1997–2000	Joe Comuzzi	Liberal
37th	2000–2004	Joe Comuzzi	Liberal
38th	2004–2006	Joe Comuzzi	Liberal
39th	2006–2007	Joe Comuzzi	Liberal
39th	2007–2007	Joe Comuzzi	Independent
39th	2007–2008	Joe Comuzzi	Conservative
40th	2008–2011	Bruce Hyer	New Democratic
41st	2011–2012	Bruce Hyer	New Democratic
41st	2012–2013	Bruce Hyer	Independent
41st	2013–2015	Bruce Hyer	Green
42nd	2015–2019	Patty Hajdu	Liberal
43rd	2019–2021	Patty Hajdu	Liberal
44th	2021–2025	Patty Hajdu	Liberal
45th	2025–present	Patty Hajdu	Liberal

== Election results ==
Graph of election results in Thunder Bay—Superior North (minor parties that never got 2% of the vote or didn't run consistently are omitted)

=== Thunder Bay—Superior North ===
2025 Canadian federal election
** Preliminary results — Not yet official **
Party	Candidate	Votes	%	±%	Expenditures
Liberal	Patty Hajdu	25,140	55.23	+14.83	
Conservative	Bob Herman	16,274	35.75	+11.79	
New Democratic	Joy Wakefield	3,239	7.12	–20.59	
People's	Amos Bradley	457	1.00	–4.89	
Green	John Malcolm Northey	410	0.90	–0.87	
Total valid votes/expense limit					
Total rejected ballots					
Turnout		45,520	67.84		
Eligible voters		67,100			
Liberal notional hold		Swing		+1.52	
Source: Elections Canada

2021 Canadian federal election
Party	Candidate	Votes	%	±%	Expenditures
Liberal	Patty Hajdu	16,893	40.7	-2.2	$94,557.23
New Democratic	Chantelle Bryson	11,244	27.1	+6.0	$40,417.50
Conservative	Joshua Taylor	10,035	24.2	-1.4	$7,497.92
People's	Rick Daines	2,465	5.9	+4.2	$0.00
Green	Amanda Moddejonge	735	1.8	-6.6	$2,082.49
Libertarian	Alexander Vodden	111	0.3	0.0	$0.00
Total valid votes		41,483			
Total rejected ballots		311			
Turnout		41,794	63.61		
Eligible voters		65,703			
Source: Elections Canada

2021 federal election redistributed results
Party	Vote	%
Liberal	17,048	40.40
New Democratic	11,693	27.71
Conservative	10,108	23.96
People's	2,487	5.89
Green	747	1.77
Others	111	0.26

2019 Canadian federal election
Party	Candidate	Votes	%	±%	Expenditures
Liberal	Patty Hajdu	18,502	42.85	-2.14	$94,089.37
Conservative	Frank Pullia	11,036	25.56	+8.13	$33,102.79
New Democratic	Anna Betty Achneepineskum	9,126	21.14	-2.04	$42,426.79
Green	Bruce Hyer	3,639	8.43	-5.37	$23,709.76
People's	Youssef Khanjari	734	1.70	–	$5,389.00
Libertarian	Alexander Vodden	140	0.32	–	$1,783.16
Total valid votes/expense limit		43,177	99.05		
Total rejected ballots		416	0.95		
Turnout		43,593	65.48	-3.22	
Eligible voters		66,579			
Liberal hold		Swing		-5.13	
Source: Elections Canada

2015 Canadian federal election: Thunder Bay—Superior North
Party	Candidate	Votes	%	±%	Expenditures
Liberal	Patty Hajdu	20,069	44.99	+28.51	$90,854.71
New Democratic	Andrew Foulds	10,339	23.18	-26.97	$121,837.34
Conservative	Richard Harvey	7,775	17.43	-12.22	$59,457.39
Green	Bruce Hyer	6,155	13.80	+10.78	$123,098.51
Independent	Robert Skaf	270	0.61	–	$6,944.34
Total valid votes/Expense limit		44,608	99.60		$248,538.44
Total rejected ballots		178	0.40		
Turnout		44,786	68.70		
Eligible voters		65,195			
Liberal gain from New Democratic		Swing		+27.74	
Source: Elections Canada

2011 federal election redistributed results
Party	Vote	%
New Democratic	18,881	50.15
Conservative	11,163	29.65
Liberal	6,203	16.48
Green	1,137	3.02
Others	264	0.70

2011 Canadian federal election: Thunder Bay—Superior North
Party	Candidate	Votes	%	±%	Expenditures
New Democratic	Bruce Hyer	18,334	49.9	+12.9	$89,828.18
Conservative	Richard Harvey	10,894	29.7	+2.9	$74,902.87
Liberal	Yves Fricot	6,117	16.7	-11.8	$75,441.94
Green	Scot Kyle	1,115	3.0	-3.9	$1,186.13
Marijuana	Denis Andrew Carrière	265	0.7	-0.2	–
Total valid votes/Expense limit		36,725	100.0		
Total rejected ballots		156	0.	–	
Turnout		36,881	–	–	
Eligible voters		60,879	–	–	
New Democratic hold		Swing			

2008 Canadian federal election: Thunder Bay—Superior North
Party	Candidate	Votes	%	±%	Expenditures
New Democratic	Bruce Hyer	13,187	37.0	+2.1	$85,186
Liberal	Don McArthur	10,083	28.3	-7.7	$74,762
Conservative	Bev Sarafin	9,556	26.8	+4.7	$56,069
Green	Brendan Hughes	2,463	6.9	+1.1	$10,885
Marijuana	Denis Andrew Carrière	327	0.9	-0.4	
Total valid votes/Expense limit		35,616	100.0	$98,240	
New Democratic gain		Swing			

2006 Canadian federal election: Thunder Bay—Superior North
Party	Candidate	Votes	%	±%
Liberal	Joe Comuzzi	13,983	36.0	-7.0
New Democratic	Bruce Hyer	13,575	34.9	+5.6
Conservative	Bev Sarafin	8,575	22.1	+0.9
Green	Dawn Kannegiesser	2,241	5.8	+1.2
Marijuana	Denis A. Carrière	487	1.3	-0.5
Total valid votes		38,861	100.0	
Liberal hold		Swing		

2004 Canadian federal election: Thunder Bay—Superior North
Party	Candidate	Votes	%	±%
Liberal	Joe Comuzzi	15,022	43.0	-5.1
New Democratic	Bruce Hyer	10,230	29.3	+9.8
Conservative	Bev Sarafin	7,394	21.2	-7.3
Green	Carl Rose	1,614	4.6	+2.6
Marijuana	Denis A. Carrière	645	1.8	0.0
Total valid votes		34,905	100.0	
Liberal hold		Swing		

Note: Conservative vote is compared to the total of the Canadian Alliance vote and Progressive Conservative vote in 2000 election.

2000 Canadian federal election
Party	Candidate	Votes	%	±%
Liberal	Joe Comuzzi	15,241	48.1	-3.7
Alliance	Doug Pantry	6,278	19.8	+3.5
New Democratic	John Rafferty	6,169	19.5	-1.3
Progressive Conservative	Richard Neumann	2,753	8.7	-2.4
Green	Carl Rose	648	2.0	
Marijuana	Denis A. Carrière	581	1.8	
Total valid votes		31,670	100.0	
Liberal hold		Swing		

Note: Canadian Alliance vote is compared to the Reform vote in 1997 election.

=== Thunder Bay—Nipigon ===
1997 Canadian federal election
Party	Candidate	Votes	%	±%
Liberal	Joe Comuzzi	16,745	51.8	-13.2
New Democratic	Chris Mather	6,705	20.8	+11.7
Reform	Doug Pantry	5,286	16.4	+1.4
Progressive Conservative	Doug Guinn	3,569	11.0	+1.5
Total valid votes		32,305	100.0	

1993 Canadian federal election
Party	Candidate	Votes	%	±%
Liberal	Joe Comuzzi	24,249	65.1	+24.8
Reform	Bob Reynolds	5,567	14.9	
Progressive Conservative	Marlene Hogarth	3,567	9.6	-16.1
New Democratic	David James Ramsay	3,363	9.0	-25.1
National	Wayne Hill	439	1.2	
Commonwealth of Canada	Brian Aalto	80	0.2	
Total valid votes		37,265	100.0	

1988 Canadian federal election
Party	Candidate	Votes	%	±%
Liberal	Joe Comuzzi	15,346	40.2	+6.2
New Democratic	Ernie Epp	13,019	34.1	-3.0
Progressive Conservative	Fred Stille	9,782	25.6	-2.7
Total valid votes		38,147	100.0	

1984 Canadian federal election
Party	Candidate	Votes	%	±%
New Democratic	Ernie Epp	13,901	37.2	+0.7
Liberal	Jack Masters	12,736	34.0	-12.6
Progressive Conservative	Jim Simpson	10,601	28.3	+11.8
Libertarian	Sally Hayes	180	0.5	
Total valid votes		37,418	100.0	

1980 Canadian federal election
Party	Candidate	Votes	%	±%
Liberal	Jack Masters	16,582	46.6	+1.7
New Democratic	Bruce McKay	12,950	36.4	+4.1
Progressive Conservative	Rene Larson	5,865	16.5	-5.7
Communist	Walter E. Rogers	109	0.3	-0.2
Marxist–Leninist	Dennis Deveau	68	0.2	+0.1
Total valid votes		35,574	100.0	

1979 Canadian federal election
Party	Candidate	Votes	%
Liberal	Bob Andras	15,674	44.9
New Democratic	Bruce McKay	11,288	32.3
Progressive Conservative	Robert R. Lingman	7,749	22.2
Communist	Nancy McDonald	174	0.5
Marxist–Leninist	Dianne Robinson	50	0.1
Total valid votes		34,935	100.0

== See also ==
- List of Canadian electoral districts
- Historical federal electoral districts of Canada
