= Pulp and paper industry in Canada =

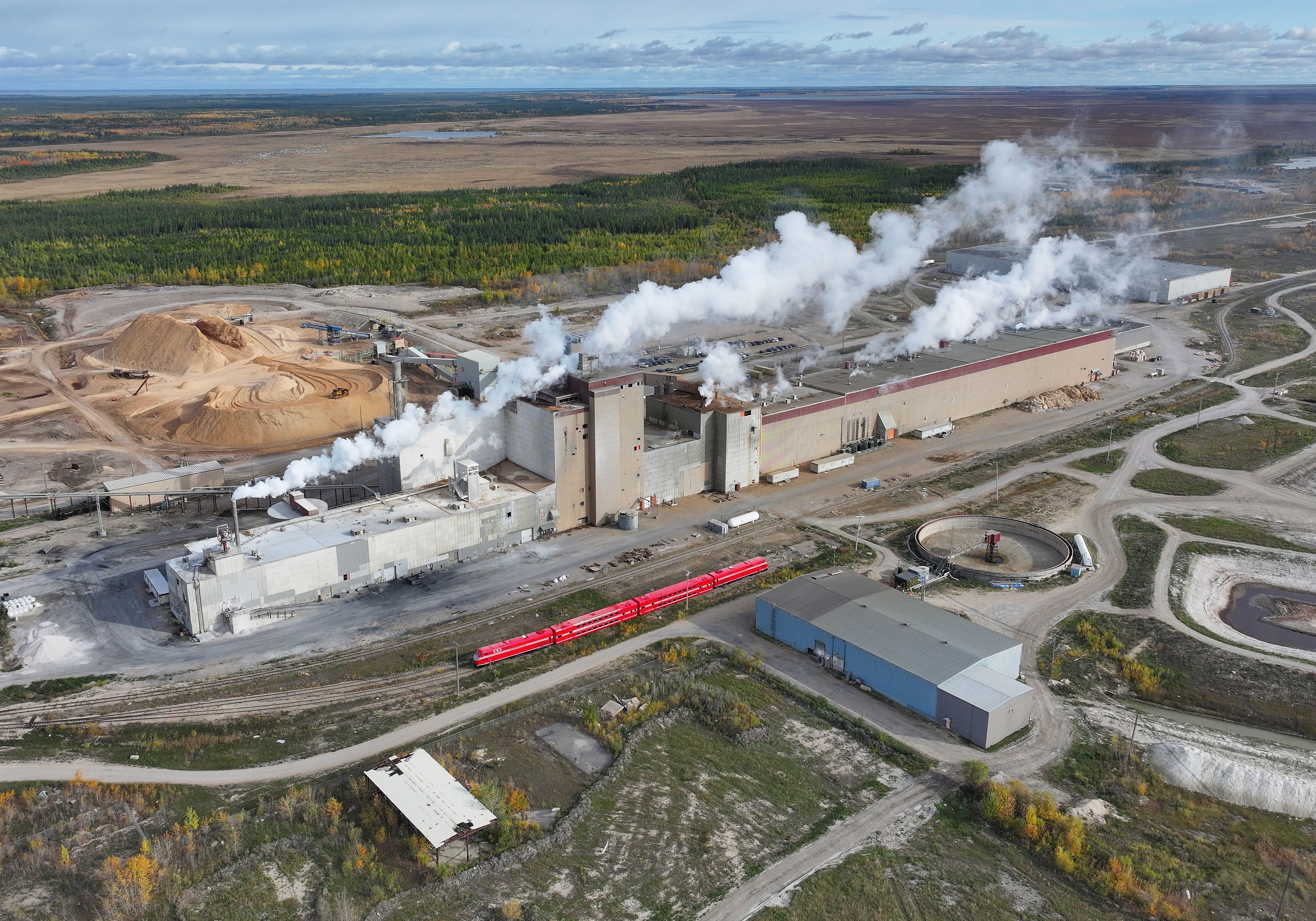
A kraft paper mill in The Pas, Manitoba

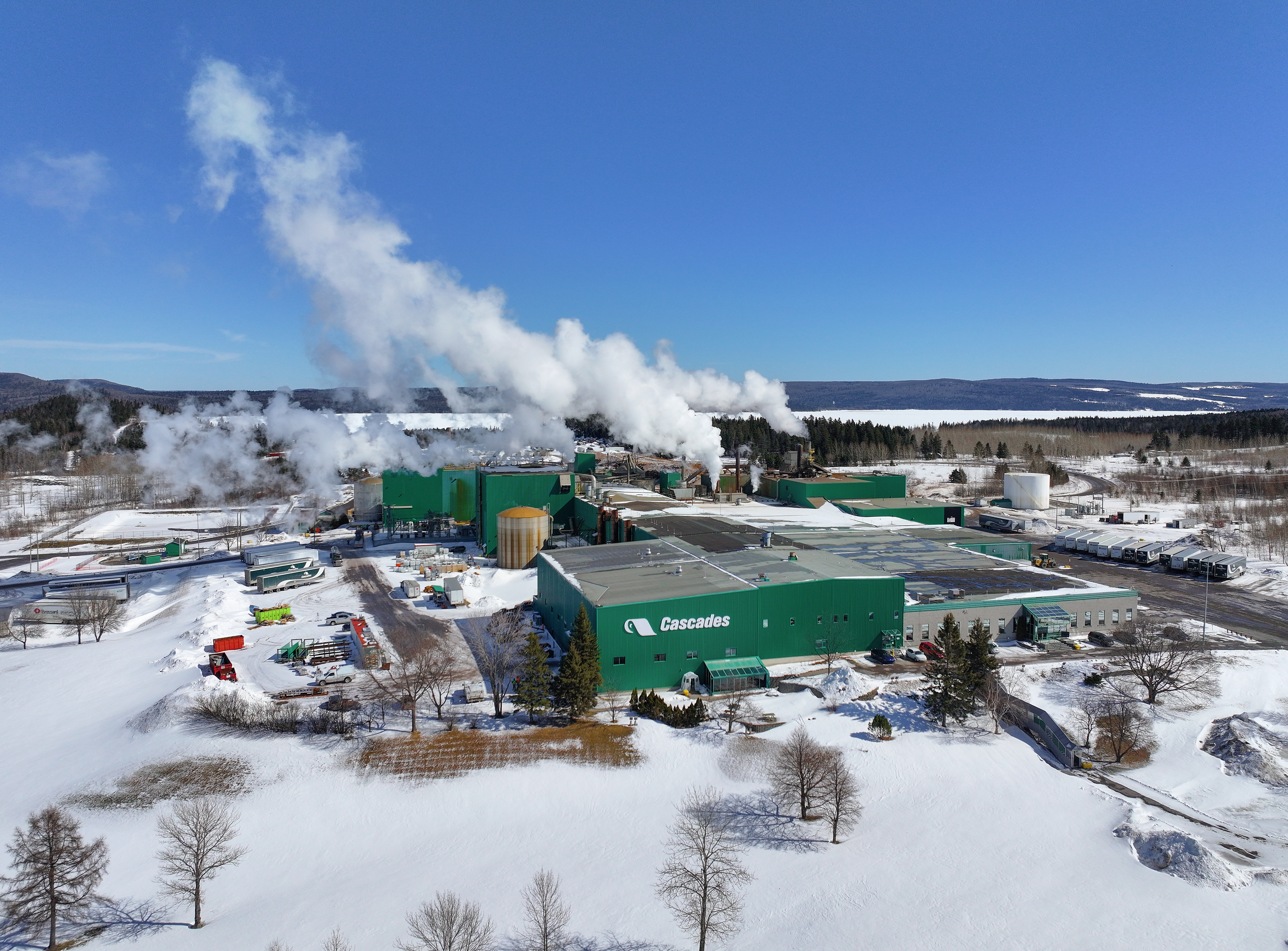
A Cascades cardboard packaging plant in Témiscouata-sur-le-Lac, Quebec

The pulp and paper industry in Canada is a major component of the national forest sector and has long been one of the country's largest manufacturing industries, closely linked to commercial logging and wood processing. In 2022, Canada's forest sector contributed about C$33.4 billion to Canada's real gross domestic product, or roughly 1.2% of national GDP, and directly supported about 200,000 jobs. Forest products, including wood pulp, paper and paperboard, remain a significant export category for Canada, representing billions of dollars in annual shipments and forming an important share of merchandise exports. Canada is consistently ranked among the world's top producers and exporters of wood pulp and paper.

Pulp and paper production is especially concentrated in Ontario and Quebec, where the industry accounts for several billion dollars in shipments, thousands of direct jobs, and in some regions remains the primary manufacturing base for local economies. Significant pulp and paper operations also exist in other provinces, including British Columbia, New Brunswick, Manitoba and Alberta, where mills supply domestic and export markets in North America and overseas.

== Environmental expenses ==
In 2000, Canadian pulp, paper and paperboard companies had operating expenses of C$425.4 million on environmental protection with the majority ($263.3 million) used for pollution abatement. Capital expenditures totalled $234.8 million, with over half ($140.4 million) being spent on pollution prevention processes.

== Leading companies ==
The leading forest and paper products companies in Canada in net sales in 2012 were:

Rank	Company	2012 Net Sales (US$M)	2012 Net Income (Loss) (US$M)
1	Domtar Inc.	5,482	172
2	Resolute Forest Products	4,503	(2)
3	Cascades Inc.	3,646	(11)
4	West Fraser Timber	3,001	87
5	Canfor	2,715	32
6	Tembec	1,667	(82)
7	Norbord	1,149	72
8	Mercer International	1,073	(16)
9	Catalyst	1,059	583
10	Millar Western Forest Products Ltd.	926	29

== Historical companies ==
Company	Founded	Defunct	Fate
Abitibi-Consolidated	30 May 1997		Merged with Bowater to form AbitibiBowater (now Resolute Forest Products)
Abitibi Power and Paper Company	4 December 1912	15 October 1979	Merged with Price Brothers to form Abitibi-Price
Abitibi-Price	15 October 1979	30 May 1997	Merged with Stone-Consolidated to form Abitibi-Consolidated
Bathurst Power and Paper Company	3 February 1928	30 December 1998	Dissolved after Consolidated-Bathurst merged with Stone Container
British Columbia Forest Products	1946	1987	Acquired by Fletcher Challenge
British Columbia Pulp and Paper Company			
Canadian International Paper Company	22 December 1916	2 June 1988	Merged with Great Lakes Paper to form Canadian Pacific Forest Products
Canadian Pacific Forest Products	2 June 1988	24 July 1998	Renamed Avenor Inc. in 1994; acquired by Bowater in 1998
Consolidated Paper Corporation (and Consolidated-Bathurst from 1967)	28 August 1931	1 September 1989	Merged with the Stone Container Corporation to form Stone-Consolidated
Fraser Companies	17 June 1917	1 May 1987	Acquired by Noranda
Great Lakes Paper	3 April 1936	2 June 1988	Merged with Canadian International Paper to form Canadian Pacific Forest Products
Howard Smith Paper Mills	1912		
Maclaren Power & Paper Company	1930		
Mersey Paper Company			
Minnesota and Ontario Pulp & Paper Company			
Price Brothers & Co.	1920	15 October 1979	Merged with Abitibi to form Abitibi-Price
Rolland Paper Company	16 June 1928	27 August 1979	Acquired by Cascades
St. Lawrence Corporation	19 May 1930	31 October 1978	Acquired by Domtar
Stone-Consolidated	1 September 1989	30 May 1997	Merged with Abitibi-Price to form Abitibi-Consolidated

== See also ==
- Bleaching of wood pulp
- Canadian Pulp and Paper Association
- Charles Fenerty
- Forestry in Canada
- Paper and pulp industry in Dryden, Ontario
