= Resolute Forest Products =

Canadian pulp and paper company

Resolute Forest Products Inc.
- Type: Subsidiary
- ISIN: US76117W1099 delisted 2023
- Industry: Pulp and Paper, Tissue, Wood Products
- Founded: 2007 (Abitibi-Consolidated and Bowater merger)
- Headquarters: Montreal, Quebec, Canada
- Area served: Worldwide
- Key people: Duncan K. Davies (Chairman); Remi G. Lalonde CEO
- Products: Market Pulp, Paper, Tissue, and Wood Products
- Revenue: ▼US$ 2.8 billion (2020)
- Operating income: ▼US$ 99 million (2020)
- Net income: ▼US$ 10 million (2020)
- Total assets: ▼US$ 3.73 billion (2020)
- Total equity: ▼US$ 1.081 billion (2020
- Owner: Paper Excellence Group (2023–present)
- Number of employees: 7,100 (2020)
- Parent: Domtar (2023–present)
- Website: www.resolutefp.com

Resolute Forest Products (French: Produits forestiers Résolu), formerly known as AbitibiBowater Inc., is a Canadian pulp and paper company. Headquartered in Montreal, Quebec, the company was formed in 2007 by the merger of Bowater and Abitibi-Consolidated. At that time, the merged company was the third largest pulp and paper company in North America, and the eighth largest in the world.

On 1 July 2012, the company's name was changed to Resolute Forest Products Inc. In 2023, the company was acquired by the Paper Excellence Group through its subsidiary, Domtar.

== History ==
On 29 January 2007, Bowater Inc. and Abitibi-Consolidated announced they would be merging to create AbitibiBowater. The merger created the third largest pulp and paper company in North America, and the eighth largest in the world. On 16 April 2009, the company filed for bankruptcy protection in the United States and similar protection under the Companies' Creditors Arrangement Act in Canada, eventually reporting debt of about US$6 billion. The company won court approval for an injection of $206 million to get it through its financial restructuring in April 2009 and emerged from creditor protection on 9 December 2010. AbitibiBowater changed its operating name to Resolute Forest Products on 1 July 2012. In a round of market consolidation, a new private company called the Paper Excellence Group acquired Catalyst Paper in 2019, Domtar in 2021 and Resolute in 2023.

=== Predecessor companies ===
The following are the principal predecessor companies of Resolute:

- AbitibiBowater (2007) name changed to Resolute (2012)
  - acquisition of Donohue (2000)
    - Abitibi-Consolidated (1997)
      - Abitibi-Price (1979) (Note: date of name change; Price acquired in 1974)
        - Abitibi Power and Paper Company (1914)
        - Price Brothers Limited (1820)
      - Consolidated‑Bathurst (1966) subsidiary of Power Corporation (Note: sold to Stone Container Corporation and renamed Stone-Consolidated (1989))
        - - Consolidated Paper Corporation (1932)
          - Bathurst Power and Paper Company (1915)
    - acquisition of QUNO (1995)
      - Donohue Inc. (1920) (Note: originally named Murray River Power and Pulp Company; name changed in 1922)
      - QUNO (1913) (Note: originally named Ontario Paper Company; founded by Robert R. McCormick, proprietor of the Chicago Tribune)
  - acquisition of Avenor (1998)
    - Bowater (1910) (Note: North American assets of Bowater plc; spun off in 1984)
    - CP Forest Products (1988) divested as Avenor (1993)
      - Great Lakes Paper (1924) (Note: acquired by Canadian Pacific Limited in 1974)
      - Canadian International Paper Company (1919) (Note: formed as a subsidiary of International Paper; spun off in 1982, becoming CIP)

== Operations ==
Resolute Forest Products manufacturing facilities in 2019 (by location)
Country	Pulp, tissue and paper	Sawmills	Remanufactured wood	Engineered wood (Note: 50% interest in joint venture)	Wood pellets
Canada	Alma, Quebec; Amos, Quebec; Baie-Comeau, Quebec; Clermont, Quebec; Dolbeau, Quebec; Gatineau, Quebec; Kénogami, Quebec; Saint-Félicien, Quebec; Thunder Bay, Ontario	Atikokan, Ontario; Comtois, Quebec; Girardville, Quebec; Ignace, Ontario; La Doré, Quebec; La Tuque, Quebec; Maniwaki, Quebec; Mistassini, Quebec; Obedjiwan, Quebec; Pointe-aux-Outardes, Quebec; Saint-Félicien, Quebec; Saint-Thomas, Quebec; Senneterre, Quebec; Thunder Bay, Ontario	Château-Richer, Quebec; La Doré, Quebec	Larouche, Quebec; Saint-Prime, Quebec	Thunder Bay, Ontario
United States	Calhoun, Tennessee; Coosa Pines, Alabama; Grenada, Mississippi; Hialeah, Florida; Menominee, Michigan; Sanford, Florida; Augusta, Georgia (Note: indefinitely idled)				

== Issues ==
=== Employees ===
The Communications, Energy and Paperworkers Union of Canada has been critical of the company's attempts to renegotiate pension contributions with their pension underfunded by approximately $1.9 billion. On 3 May 2013, it was reported that an agreement was put in place which may address the ongoing pension dispute with Resolute agreeing to increase its pension payments and “stabilize the pension plan over the next decade.”

=== Environmental accreditations ===
On August 29, 2013, a case study examining the use of Forest Stewardship Council (FSC) Controlled Wood system by Resolute was released. The report concludes that Resolute's improper application of Forest Stewardship Council standards threatens the integrity of the FSC system and brand. On January 1, 2014, after a successful appeal by the Grand Council of the Crees, three FSC certificates covering more than 8 million hectares of forest were suspended. FSC found violations of its principles relating to indigenous Peoples’ rights, environmental impacts, forest benefits, monitoring and assessment, and High Conservation Value forests. Resolute Forest Products became a member of the World Wildlife Fund’s Climate Saver’s Program on November 10, 2011, with a commitment to “reduce their absolute greenhouse gas (GHG) emissions by 65 per cent by 2015 below 2000 levels” .

=== Greenpeace ===
Resolute Forest Products has been criticized by Greenpeace and other organizations for advancing logging and road building in endangered species habitat in Québec and Ontario.

On 18 May 2010, Resolute Forest Products joined 29 other organizations, including Greenpeace Canada and the David Suzuki Foundation, to become a founding member of the Canadian Boreal Forest Agreement (CBFA). The agreement formalizes the members’ commitments to conserving vast areas of forests and enabling the legislated protection of large-scale areas that are needed to preserve threatened species such as woodland caribou. Claiming a lack of progress on delivering results within the CBFA, particularly on the creation of protected areas and caribou conservation plans, Greenpeace Canada and Canopy, two founding signatories, departed the agreement in December 2012 and April 2013 respectively. Other environmental organizations suspended work with Resolute on May 21, 2013, announcing that "Resolute will not do the minimum that the science says is required to protect our forests and the threatened caribou that call them home."

Greenpeace Canada released a report examining Resolute's sustainability claims in May 2013, alleging that the company is deceiving customers about the sustainability of their forestry operations and their interactions with communities, First Nations and workers. Greenpeace withdrew an earlier criticism of Resolute Forest Products on 19 March 2013 noting that a December 2012 campaign against the company “incorrectly stated that Resolute had breached the Canadian Boreal Forest Agreement”.

On May 23, 2013, Resolute filed a $7,000,000 defamation lawsuit against Greenpeace Canada and two of its staff in Ontario Superior Court alleging the organization interfered with economic relations with their customers. In response Greenpeace launched a legal defense fund and characterized the lawsuit as a Strategic Lawsuit Against Public Participation (SLAPP). In September 2016, the Ontario Superior Court dismissed Resolute's defamation action on the grounds it was designed to "greatly expand the scope of the litigation and transform the trial into an inquiry into Greenpeace." The logging company responded saying the "court decision does not in any way diminish the claims against Greenpeace of defamation and intentional interference with commercial relations."

In May 2016, Resolute filed a $300 million-dollar lawsuit in Atlanta, Georgia, using the United States' RICO Act (which is primarily for fighting organized crime and racketeering) against Greenpeace. The complaint alleges that the environmental group is a "global fraud" that is tricking people in both the US and around the world into donating "millions of dollars based on materially false and misleading claims about its purported environmental purpose and its “campaigns” against targeted companies." In January 2017, Greenpeace asked a court in Georgia for the case to be dismissed on the grounds that the company's use of RICO "is simply an intimidation tactic that would set a dangerous precedent if successful" because Resolute "is trying to silence critics of its logging practices in Canada's boreal forests." In June 2017 several major book publishers including Penguin Random House and HarperCollins have had to respond to Resolute's RICO action after a petition, which was signed by more than 100 authors in support of Greenpeace, was presented at BookExpo 2017, the USA's publishing trade show. The petition's signatories are concerned that using RICO in this particular action is a legal attempt to stymie free speech.

In 2019, the federal district court for the Northern District of California dismissed most of the claims by Resolute Forest Products and, in April 2022, the court ordered Resolute Forest Products to pay Greenpeace $800,000 in costs after Greenpeace brought an anti-SLAPP motion against the company.
