= Great Lakes Paper =

Pulp and paper manufacturing facility in Ontario

Great Lakes Paper Company
- Industry: Pulp and paper
- Founded: 1924; 102 years ago in Fort William, Ontario, Canada
- Defunct: 1988
- Fate: Purchased by Bowater
- Successor: Bowater Forest Products
- Number of employees: 4,000

The Great Lakes Paper Company was the operator of the largest and most modern pulp and paper manufacturing facility in the world. The Company employed over 4,000 in Northern Ontario, starting in 1924 as a pulp mill at Fort William, Ontario (now Thunder Bay, Ontario Canada). Great Lakes had a highly developed social network within the company, including a children's Christmas party held at a local arena, and an annual picnic held at a local park, as well as many sports teams and other social groups. The company's working environment was enhanced by cultural diversity. For example under the Government of Canada's immigration policy, the "Close Relatives Scheme" resulted in over 400 Ukrainian refugees being employed as workers after World War II.

Great Lakes fell victim to trends in the pulp and paper industry in Northern Ontario in the early 21st century. Factors in the decline of Great Lakes and the pulp and paper industry in general included trends in advertising, electronic data transmission and storage and the Internet, all of which continue to have adverse effects on traditional print media. Newspaper, magazine and catalog publishing customers increasingly use other forms of media and advertising and electronic data transmission and storage, including television and the Internet, instead of paper products. North American newsprint demand has been in decline for several (annual declines of 5.6% in 2005, 6.1% in 2006, 10.3% in 2007, 11.2% in 2008 and 25.3% in 2009). Forecasts indicate that these declines in newsprint demand could continue for several years.

As well, negative impacts on the survival of the Company included increases in global newsprint capacity, particularly in China and Europe, which resulted in lower prices, volumes or both for the Canadian industry's exported products.

The relationship between industry supply and demand for forest products, rather than changes in the cost of raw materials, determines the industry’s ability to increase prices. Consequently, the industry has been unable to pass along increases in operating costs to its customers.

The major factors contributing to the ultimate merger and demise of the Company are:

• Energy prices, particularly for electricity, natural gas and fuel oil, which have been volatile in recent years.

• Wood fiber costs—wood fiber is the principal raw material used in the business. The primary source for wood fiber is timber. Environmental litigation and regulatory developments have caused significant reductions in the amount of timber available for commercial harvest in Canada. The Province of Ontario has been reluctant to approve new cutting rights pursuant to the Company’s forest licenses and forest management agreements. Legislation and litigation advanced by Aboriginal groups and litigation concerning the use of timberlands, the protection of endangered species, the promotion of forest biodiversity and the response to and prevention of catastrophic wildfires have also affected timber supplies.

Control of the Great Lakes Paper, a long-standing publicly owned company changed over the years and in 1974 was acquired by Canadian Pacific Limited ("CP"). CP changed the Company's name to Great Lakes Forest Products. It was later amalgamated with Canadian International Paper Company becoming Canadian Pacific Forest Products and later spun off as Avenor. In 1998 the Company was acquired by Bowater becoming Bowater Forest Products. In 2007 Bowater and Abitibi-Consolidated merged forming AbitibiBowater.

In 2009 the newsprint portion of the Thunder Bay plant was idled indefinitely leaving only one line of the kraft mill operating and forcing the layoffs of several hundred employees. On April 16, 2009, Bowater filed for bankruptcy protection in the United States and underwent a restructuring. In February 2010, the largest remaining paper machine (#5) was restarted. In addition, the company renegotiated labor agreements; resized the workforce; rolled out a wage reduction across the woodlands operations; and renegotiated its power agreement. The combined changes resulted in a cash cost savings at the mill of over $150 per ton and AbitibiBowater believes Thunder Bay is now one of the lowest cash cost mills in the industry.

AbitibiBowater emerged from creditor protection in 2010, and traded as an over-the-counter stock. It changed its name to Resolute Forest Products in late 2011 and now trades on the NYSE and the TSX.

== Historical timeline ==
- July 4, 1919, Organization of Great Lakes Paper Company Limited by Lewis L. Alstead and George A. Seaman; issue of letters patent
- 1920 acquires a proposed mill site adjoining Fort William, Ontario; acquires rights to Black Sturgeon and other timber limits
- 1923 Construction commences on groundwood mill
- 1924 First groundwood produced
- 1927–1929 Backus Brooks Enterprises of Minneapolis acquired the company and began erection of a paper mill.
- 1927 Construction commences on newsprint mill with two paper machines. One machine to be largest in world
- 1928 Operation of first newsprint machine "Judy"
- 1929 Operation of second newsprint machine "Jumbo" then the world's largest; mill considered to be most modern paper manufacturing facility in the world.
- 1931 Enters receivership due to parent company, Ontario-Minnesota entering receivership owing Great Lakes $2-million
- 1935/1936 Group of 25 U.S. publishers purchases company from receiver; Ontario letters patent issued
- 1937 Woods department established to reduce costs and establish control over wood delivery
- 1940 Acquires Dog River, Lac des Mille Lacs and English River timber limits
- 1953 Fox family of Montreal attains management control of company; executive offices move to Fort William
- 1957 Number 3 paper machine "Jill" begins production
- 1958 Completed Paper Machine 4 "Jupiter" built by Black Clawson Company; at the time the largest paper machine in the world
- 1960 Horses no longer used in logging operations
- 1966 "A" Kraft mill begins operation
- 1973 New Kraft pulp mill
- 1974 began to operate a 32-rail car capacity ferry, the Incan Superior, between Thunder Bay and Superior, Wisconsin on Lake Superior. The service ran until 1992
- 1979 Canadian Pacific Investments purchases 54% after Fox family puts shares on market; name changed to Great Lakes Forest Products Ltd. (name changes to reflect company's expansion and diversification—newsprint, kraft pulp, stud lumber, waferboard; (latter two products no longer manufactured at this location); purchase of Reed Paper in Dryden, Ontario.
- 1988 Canadian Pacific Forest Products Ltd. "CPFP" (result of merger between CIP Inc., Montreal, and Great Lakes Forest Products Ltd., Thunder Bay)
- 1990 Number 5 Paper Machine "Theresa Marie" part of a $500 million expansion/modernization program, was built to replace the now-defunct Paper Machines 1 & 2
- 1994 Avenor Inc. (publicly owned Company; CP Ltd. no longer majority shareholder: name change was inspired by the Latin root for advantage, meaning "going forward" and from the word, "north." Prior to the merger, Canadian Pacific Ltd. owned CIP and held 54.3% of Great Lakes with the rest owned by public shareholders. In September 1993, Canadian Pacific Ltd. divested itself of its majority ownership by selling all of its 36.7 million common shares in CPFP. Consequent to the sale, the company changed its name to Avenor Inc. Under Avenor, the Thunder Bay site saw the addition of the introduction of recycled fiber into and the rebuild/streamlining of its groundwood operation. A comprehensive modernization program upgraded the facilities to the top ranks of North American mills from both a quality and cost standpoint. Deinking equipment give the facility capacity for 992,000 tpy of newsprint with a recycled fiber content level of 20%.
- 1998 Bowater Pulp and Paper Canada Inc. (through the acquisition of Avenor Inc., July 24, 1998, Bowater became the second largest producer of newsprint in the world and the third largest producer of market pulp in North America)
- 2002 Bowater Canadian Forest Products Inc. January 1, 2002, amalgamation of two of Bowater's subsidiaries, Bowater Pulp and Paper Canada Inc. and Bowater Canadian Forest Products Inc. (formerly Alliance Forest)
- 2007 Bowater Inc. completed combination with Abitibi-Consolidated to become AbitibiBowater on October 29.
- 2009 AbitibiBowater files for bankruptcy protection in the U.S. and completes a restructuring.
- 2010 Emerges from bankruptcy protection.
- 2011 Operating name changed to Resolute Forest Products.
- 2026 Paper machine 5 shut down
