= David Edward Price =

Canadian politician

The Hon. David Edward Price
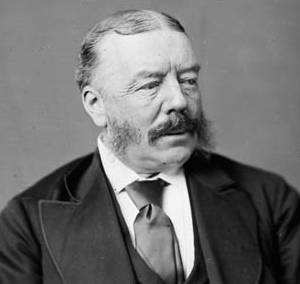

Senator for The Laurentides, Quebec
- In office 1867–1883
- Appointed by: Royal Proclamation
- Succeeded by: James Gibb Ross

Personal details
- Born: May 11, 1826 Quebec City, Lower Canada
- Died: August 22, 1883 (aged 57) Sillery, Quebec, Canada
- Resting place: Mount Hermon Cemetery, Sillery, Quebec
- Party: Conservative
- Parent(s): William Price; Jane Stewart
- Relatives: William Evan Price (brother); Evans John Price (brother)

David Edward Price (May 11, 1826 – August 22, 1883) was a Quebec businessman and political figure. He was a Conservative member of the Senate of Canada from 1867 to 1883.

He was born at Quebec City in 1826, the son of William Price, and, after completing his studies, went to London, England to learn the lumber trade with his father's partners. In 1847, he began work in his father's firm. He was elected to the Legislative Council of the Province of Canada representing Chicoutimi and Tadoussac in an 1855 by-election; he was elected in Chicoutimi—Saguenay in 1858, 1861 and 1863. He resigned in 1864 and was elected to the Legislative Council for the Laurentides division in the same year. He served until Confederation when he was appointed to the Senate.

In 1867, with his brothers William Evan and Evan John, he started Price Brothers and Company, a forest products firm based in the Quebec and Saguenay regions which took over the assets of his father's company. He served as vice-consul at Saguenay for Denmark, Sweden, Norway, Argentina and Peru, and as a consular agent for the United States.

In 1871, Senator David Edward Price became the last 'Seigneur des Grondines'.

He died at his home in Sillery in 1883, while still in office.
