= Abitibi Power and Paper Company =

Canadian pulp and paper company (1912–1997)

Abitibi Power and Paper Company Limited
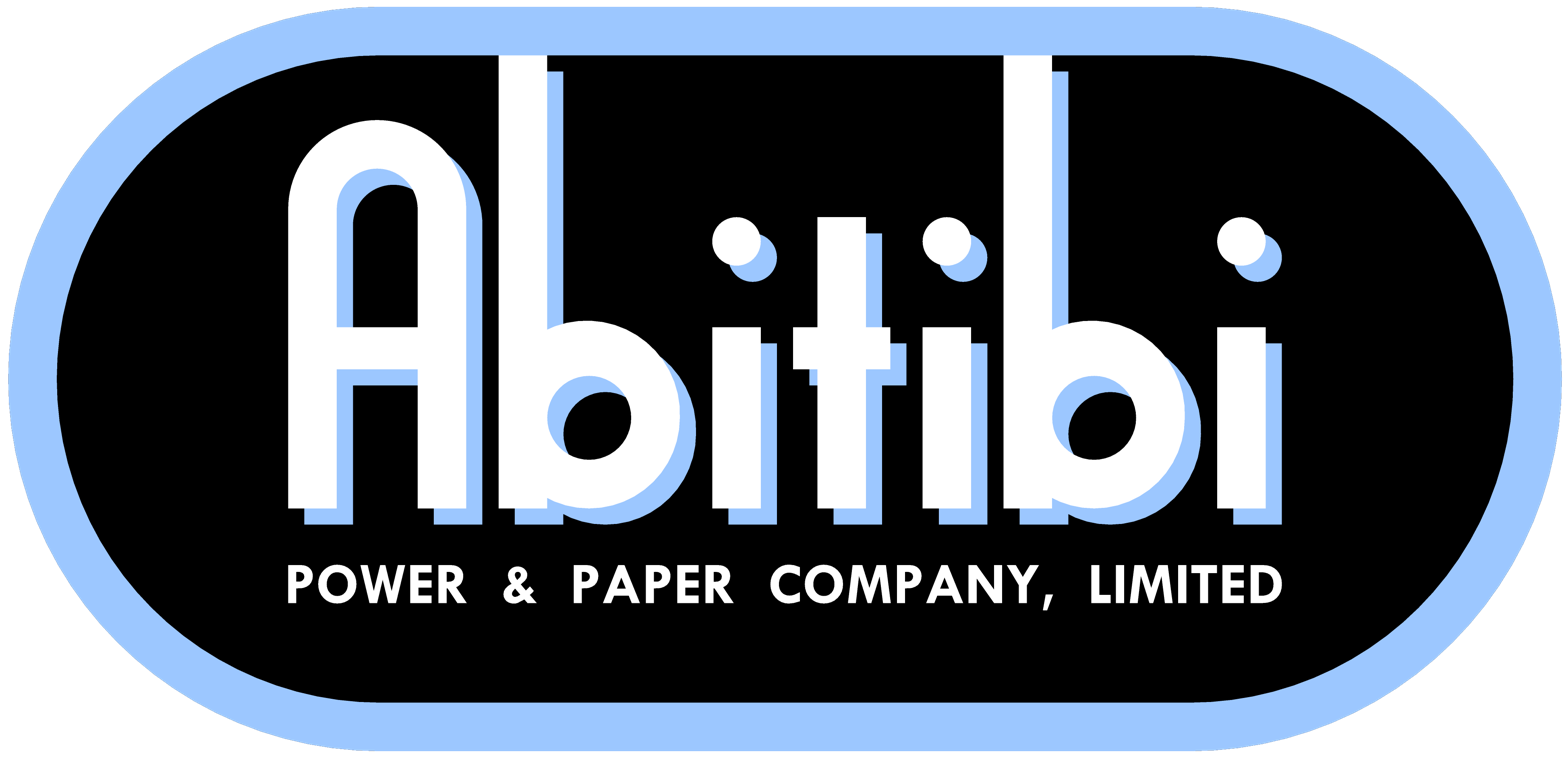
- Industry: Pulp and paper
- Founded: 4 December 1912
- Defunct: 30 May 1997
- Successor: Abitibi-Consolidated
- Headquarters: 408 University Avenue, Toronto, Ontario

Abitibi Power and Paper Company Limited was a forest products business founded in 1914 and based in Montreal, Quebec. The firm was a major producer in the Canadian newsprint industry during the first half of the 20th century. Between 1974 and 1979, Abitibi acquired the Price Company (formerly Price Brothers & Company), and changed its name to Abitibi-Price Inc. in 1979.

In 1997, Abitibi-Price merged with the Stone-Consolidated Corporation to form Abitibi-Consolidated. Abitibi-Consolidated then merged with Bowater in 2007 to form AbitibiBowater, which was renamed Resolute Forest Products in 2011. In 2023, the Paper Excellence Group acquired Resolute, having already acquired Domtar two years earlier. In 2024, Paper Excellence, Resolute, and Domtar merged under the Domtar name.

== Formation and rise (1912–1932) ==
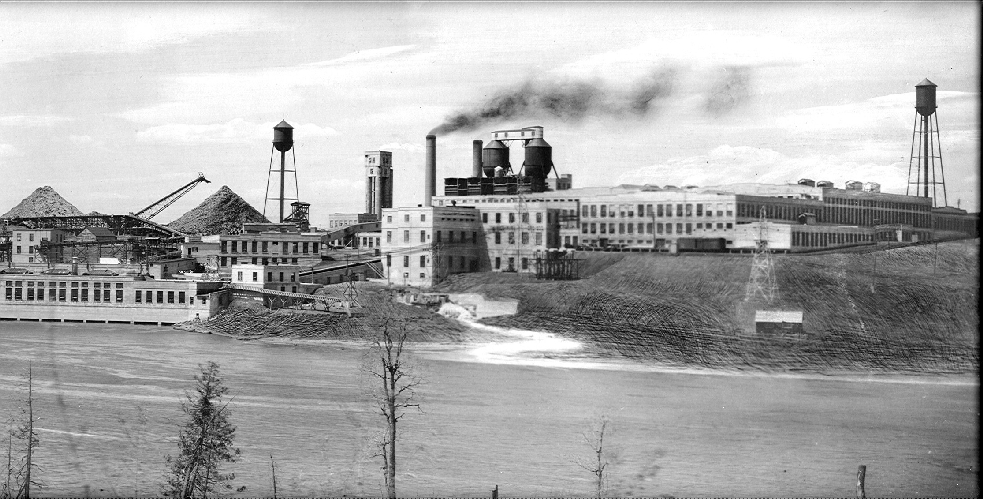
Abitibi mill at Iroquois Falls (1930)

Abitibi Pulp and Paper Mills Ltd. was provincially incorporated on December 4, 1912, at Iroquois Falls, Ontario on the Abitibi River by Frank Harris Anson, who received initial financing from Shirley Ogilvie, heir to the Ogilvie Flour Mills fortune. On February 9, 1914, it was reorganized as the Abitibi Power and Paper Co. Ltd., which was incorporated under the Dominion Companies Act, in order to raise adequate capital for its plant and operations and to transfer its head office to Montreal. Its formation coincided with the passage of the Underwood Tariff in the United States, which allowed free trade for newsprint and prompted a northward rush from US publishers wanting to secure a cheap supply from Canada.

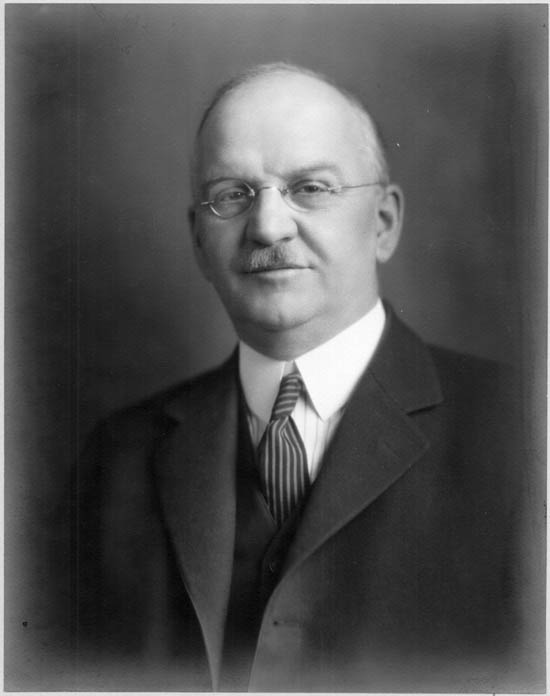
Howard Ferguson

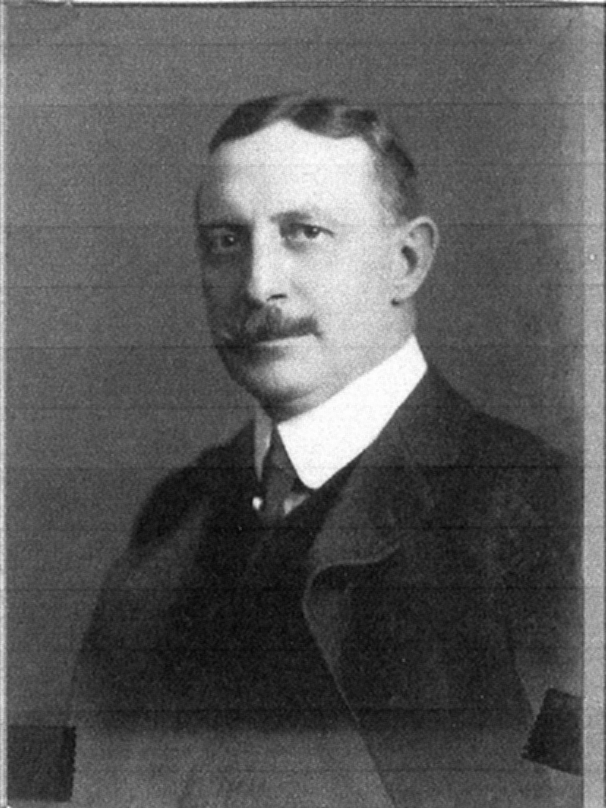
Frank Harris Anson, founder of Abitibi

Its expansion was greatly aided in 1919 when Howard Ferguson, Ontario's Minister of Lands and Forests, approved the reservation of 1,500 square miles (3,885 km^{2}) of pulpwood on Crown land for Abitibi's use. Ferguson declared, "My ambition has been to see the largest paper industry in the world established in the Province, and my attitude towards the pulp and paper industry has been directed towards assisting in bringing this about." After becoming Premier of Ontario in 1923, Ferguson reserved a further 3,000 square miles (7,770 km^{2}) to Abitibi.

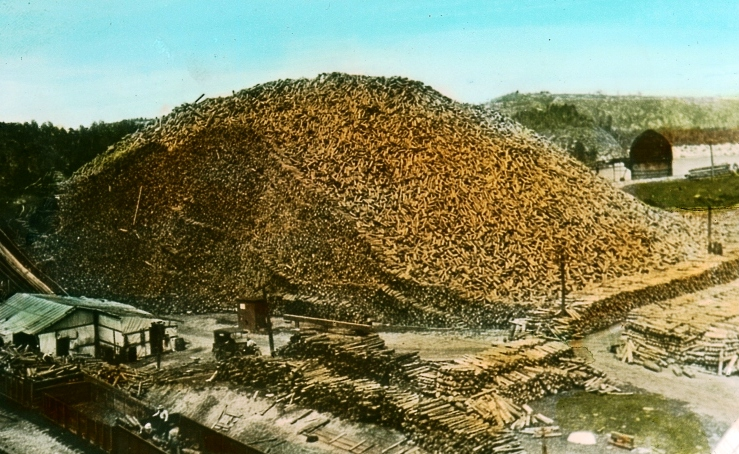
Spanish River Pulp and Paper Mills at Espanola (1927)

The company expanded to other locations in Ontario where it also built dams and operated hydro electric power stations. Integration of pulp and paper operations was encouraged by Anson's business partner, Alexander Smith, who became Abitibi's president upon Anson's death in 1923. Wherever the company built a mill, a new town sprang up around it and it even built radio stations such as CFCH in Iroquois Falls to serve these remote new communities. The company acquired other small lumber operations and grew to become a major force in the North American newsprint business, becoming the largest manufacturer in Ontario, and for a short time the largest pulp and paper company in the world.

Abitibi did not maintain a sales force, relying on the Mead Corporation to handle all marketing initiatives in the US. Abitibi also invested in new Mead initiatives, and in 1927 acquired the Spanish River Pulp and Paper Mills from Mead, in a transaction that was subsequently seen to be highly overvalued and having a conflict of interest that was ultimately detrimental to Abitibi's shareholders. Changing economic conditions forced the closure of the Spanish River facility in 1929.

Abitibi's power operations were further extended after 1926, when the Ferguson government gave its approval for the development of the Abitibi Canyon, the largest such development since the Niagara River, in preference to incurring more debt for Ontario Hydro. The development was encouraged through secret commitments for long-term purchases of electricity and indemnification of Hydro against any losses. Questions were asked at the time as to how the additional 100,000 horsepower (75,000 kW) in capacity would be used, as there were virtually no customers for it.

It increased its gross earnings to $5,650,264 in 1918 from $4,422,757 in 1917. Along with other paper manufacturers in Canada, Abitibi Power and Paper Company operated at 75% capacity in 1929. During the Great Depression, Manitoba Paper Mills, a subsidiary located in Pine Falls, Manitoba, was forced to close.

== Receivership (1932–1946) ==
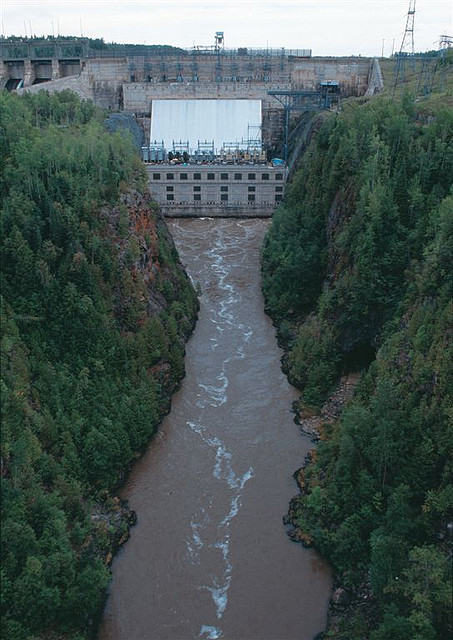
Abitibi Canyon Generating Station

In 1927–1928, Abitibi financed a large redemption of its securities through a $55 million bond offering, while simultaneously promising an annual dividend of $4 million to its common shareholders. Between 1927 and 1934, newsprint prices fell from $70/tonne to $40/tonne. Abitibi was forced to run its mills at 28.4% of capacity in 1932 and 26.8% in 1933, as well as suspending its dividend payments.

Abitibi defaulted on its mortgage bond interest payments on June 1, 1932, and was placed in receivership. Many leases on its timber concessions were also expiring around the same time. On September 26, 1932, the company was declared insolvent under the Winding-Up Act and a provisional liquidator was appointed.

Beginning in 1933, legislation was passed to allow Ontario Hydro to take control of several Abitibi power developments. (Note: The Abitibi Canyon Power Development Act, 1933, S.O. 1933, c. 3 with respect to Abitibi Canyon, and The Abitibi Power and Paper Company, Limited, Act, 1937, S.O. 1937, c. 4 with respect to a dam and transmission line at Sturgeon Falls) Certain dealings relating to the 1933 acquisition came to be known as the "great Abitibi swindle," which resulted in the fall of the Henry government in the 1934 Ontario election, to be succeeded by that of Mitchell Hepburn.

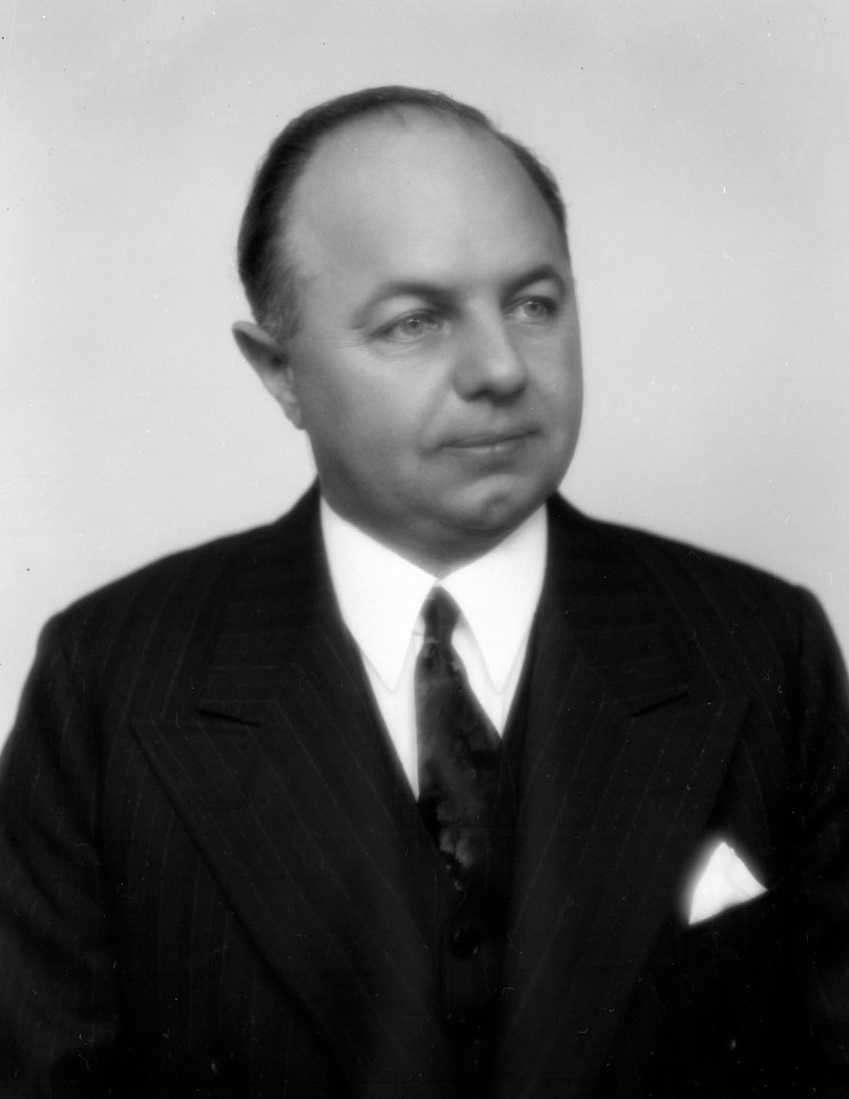
Mitchell Hepburn

The Legislative Assembly of Ontario passed legislation in 1935 in order to bypass any subsequent application of the Companies' Creditors Arrangement Act. (Note: The Judicature Amendment Act, 1935, S.O. 1935, c. 32 , subsequently held not to apply as the Companies' Creditors Arrangement Act and the Dominion Companies Act already covered the field while Abitibi remained under federal protection, by Montreal Trust Company v. Abitibi Power and Paper Company Limited, et al., 1938 CanLII 55, [1938] OR 81 (17 January 1938), Superior Court of Justice (Ontario, Canada), affirmed by Montreal Trust Company v. Abitibi Power & Paper Co. Ltd. et al., 1938 CanLII 109, [1938] OR 589 (13 June 1938), Court of Appeal (Ontario, Canada)) A liquidator was appointed on December 20, 1935. In addition, as any refinancing would be contingent upon reinstatement of Abitibi's timber limits, further legislation was passed to allow this to occur, subject to approval by the courts and the Lieutenant-Governor in Council. Hepburn felt this to be necessary in order to assure that any reorganization coincided with public policy, unlike what had happened in Quebec between Price Brothers Limited and the Taschereau administration. In March 1939, an order in council was passed that declared that any scheme receiving court approval would be considered acceptable to the government. When the Second World War broke out later in the year, and with public sentiment almost unanimous against foreclosure, the government withdrew its support but failed to rescind the order. Despite subsequent threats by Hepburn to cancel Abitibi's timber rights, a judicial sale of Abitibi's assets was ordered in 1940.

Hepburn appointed a royal commission to investigate the matter, in order to determine the best course of resolution. The Legislative Assembly imposed a moratorium in 1941, (Note: The Abitibi Power and Paper Company Limited Moratorium Act, 1941, S.O. 1941, c. 1 , extended by The Abitibi Power and Paper Company Limited Moratorium Act, 1942, S.O. 1942, c. 3 and The Abitibi Power and Paper Company Limited Moratorium Act, 1944, S.O. 1944, c. 1) which was ultimately upheld by the Judicial Committee of the Privy Council in 1943. (Note: Abitibi Power and Paper Company Limited v Montreal Trust Company and others [1943] UKPC 37, [1943] AC 536 (8 July 1943) (on appeal from Ontario), setting aside Montreal Trust Company v. Abitibi Power & Paper Company Limited, 1941 CanLII 61, [1942] OR 183 (4 December 1941), Court of Appeal (Ontario, Canada). The appeal was facilitated by The Abitibi Moratorium Constitutional Question Act, 1942, S.O. 1942, c. 2) The commission's recommended plan was accepted by all creditors, but only after they accepted that prior consent would be required from the Province for any changes to Abitibi's production and conservation measures, and it would emerge from receivership on April 30, 1946—one of the longest such receiverships in Canadian history, which was seen to have been extended by the Ontario government's actions which ensured protection of jobs at high-cost mills throughout northern communities, as well as for common shareholders. However, the company's operations remained diversified after reorganization, and the proportion of Canadian ownership was higher after the receivership ended than it was in 1932.

=== Disposal to KVP and aftermath ===
During the final years of the Hepburn government, it sought to stimulate employment in Northern Ontario in order to stabilize its political position. In that regard, it encouraged negotiations between Abitibi and Kalamazoo Vegetable Parchment Company of Parchment, Michigan, which resulted in the sale of Abitibi's Spanish River facility (at that time its largest non-economic asset) in 1943. It subsequently resumed operation as the KVP Company.

In 1948, KVP was sued for nuisance in allowing noxious effluent to be discharged into the Spanish River, and an injunction was issued barring it from making any further discharge. The order was appealed all the way to the Supreme Court of Canada without success. In 1950, the injunction was dissolved by an Act of the provincial legislature, which provided for any subsequent disputes with KVP to be taken to arbitration, which, together with other legislative changes, effectively curtailed chances for any further injunctions to be issued. The 1950 Act was not repealed until 2006.

The 1950 Act effectively gave KVP a limited licence to pollute, and serious cleanup efforts did not happen until the 1980s. (Note: Further background can be found at Brubaker, Elizabeth (1995). "4: In the Name of the Public Good". Property Rights in the Defence of Nature. Toronto: Environment Probe. ISBN 0-91984924-5. Archived from the original on 2014-11-28.)

== Aftermath (1946–1979) ==
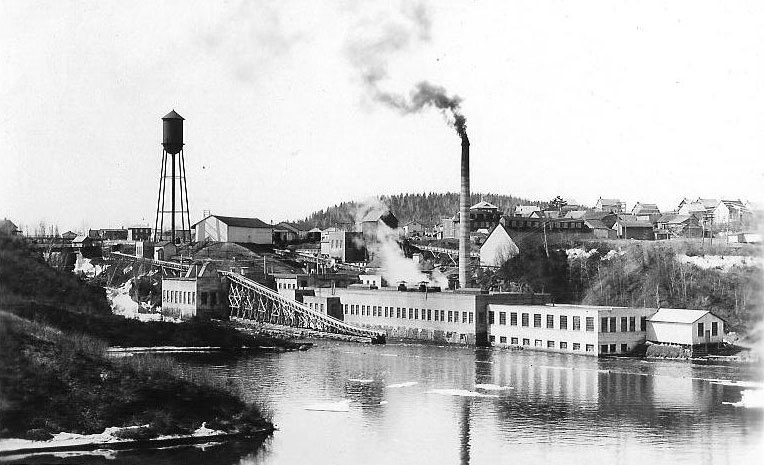
Price mill in Jonquière

Emerging from bankruptcy, the company prospered in the post-World War II industrial boom and in 1965 changed its name to the Abitibi Paper Company Ltd. However, significant competition from producers in the southern United States, starting in 1945, resulted in them providing for 29% of all newsprint demand by 1955, although Canadian and northern US overcapacity resulted in overall prices remaining low. From 1956 to 1970, Abitibi's capacity utilization rate trailed the Canadian industry average, indicating that it was running at higher-than-average costs. It opted to expand through acquisition, as its present capacity was relatively fixed and aging, and new investment would require a return on investment of 8%–10% in the economic climate of the early 1970s.

Its first acquisition elsewhere in the industry occurred in 1968, when it took over Cox Newsprint and Cox Woodlands, both subsidiaries of Cox Enterprises, and thus gained a foothold in the southern US. In 1974, Abitibi subsequently purchased a controlling interest in Price Brothers Limited, a low-cost producer with newer equipment which had extensive operations in the Province of Quebec and whose vast forestry business dated back to the William Price Company established in Quebec City in 1820. The merger of Abitibi and Price Brothers created the world's biggest newsprint producer, and in 1979 it changed its name to Abitibi-Price.
