= Abitibi-Consolidated =

Former Canadian pulp and paper company

Abitibi Consolidated Inc.
- Company type: Public company (TSX: A), (NYSE: ABY)
- Industry: Pulp and paper, wood products
- Predecessor: Abitibi-Price Inc. Stone Consolidated Corp.
- Founded: Montreal, Quebec, Canada (1997)
- Defunct: 2007; bought by Resolute Forest Products
- Fate: Merged
- Successor: AbitibiBowater Inc.
- Headquarters: Montreal, Quebec, Canada
- Area served: Worldwide
- Key people: John W. Weaver (CEO); Jacques Bougie (Chairman); Pierre Rougeau (CFO)
- Products: Newsprint, Uncoated Groundwood, Wood Products, Recycling Services
- Revenue: ▲$5.342 billion CAD (2005)
- Operating income: ▼$276.00 million CAD (2005)
- Net income: ▼$350.00 million CAD (2005)
- Number of employees: 17,000 (2006)
- Website: www.abitibiconsolidated.com

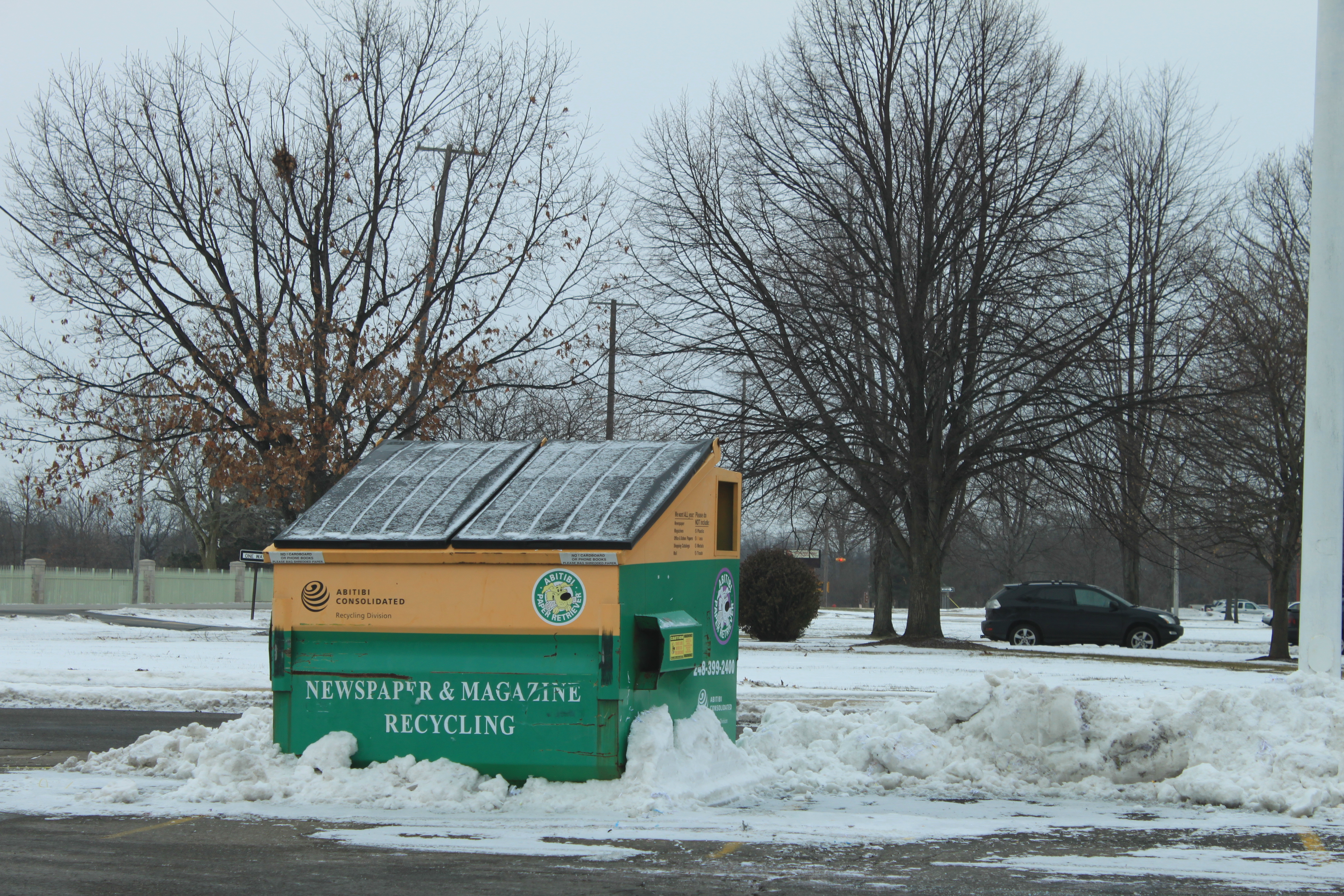
Abitibi Recycling bin, New Boston, Michigan

Abitibi Consolidated Inc. was a Canadian pulp and paper company based in Montreal, Quebec. Abitibi-Consolidated was formed from the merger of Abitibi-Price Inc. and Stone Consolidated Corp. on May 29, 1997; the company merged with Bowater in 2007 to form AbitibiBowater.

== Operations ==
A network of 19 paper mills, 20 sawmills, 4 remanufacturing facilities and 2 engineered wood facilities, located in Canada, the United States and the United Kingdom, supplied publishers, printers, building products distributors and housing manufacturers in over 70 countries. It had approximately 12,500 employees.

A global leader in newsprint, commercial printing papers and wood products, the company saw combined revenues of $4.85 billion in 2006. Number one in Canada in terms of total certified woodlands, Abitibi-Consolidated was also one of the largest recyclers of newspapers and magazines, serving 21 metropolitan areas in North America and the United Kingdom.

In addition, the company had significant hydroelectric generating assets in eastern Canada, which provided a cost advantage for the associated production facilities and was an extension into the energy sector.

== History ==
=== Price Brothers ===
Price Brothers & Company Limited was a lumber firm from Quebec founded in 1820 as William Price Company by William Price. Following the death of Price Sr sons William Evan Price and Evans John Price took over and the firm became Price Brothers and Company Limited.

In 1910 the company became Price Brothers Limited as (Sir) William Price III took control of the family firm. After Sir William's death in 1924, his sons John Herbert and Arthur Clifford Price assumed control. In the 1930s the Price family lost control and the firm was sold. Price Brothers and Company was renamed Price Limited in 1966 and was acquired by Abitibi Power and Paper Co. and became Abitibi-Price in 1974. When Abitibi-Price became Abitibi-Consolidated in 1997, the Price name finally disappeared.

=== Abitibi ===
Abitibi Pulp and Paper Co. Ltd. was founded in 1912 at Iroquois Falls, Ontario on the Abitibi River by Frank Harris Anson. The following February, the company name was changed to Abitibi Power and Paper Co. Ltd. to reflect the power generation business it created through the need to build a dam to generate electricity for its mill. The company expanded to other locations in Ontario where it also built dams and operated hydro electric power stations. Wherever the company built a mill, a new town sprang up around it and it even built radio stations such as CFCH in Iroquois Falls to serve these remote new communities. The company acquired other small lumber operations and grew to become a major force in the North American newsprint business but the Great Depression forced the company to file for bankruptcy protection on September 10, 1932. A Royal commission was held to enquire into the company's affairs, with its report issued in March 1941. It remained under the control of the Court-appointed Receiver until 1946, the longest such receivership in Canadian history. Emerging from bankruptcy, the company prospered in the post-World War II industrial boom and in 1965 changed its name to the Abitibi Paper Company Ltd. In 1974, Abitibi purchased a controlling interest in Price Brothers & Company Limited, which had extensive operations in Quebec and whose vast forestry business dated back to the William Price Company established in Quebec City in 1820. The merger of Abitibi and Price Brothers made it the world's biggest newsprint producer. In 1979, the corporate name was changed to Abitibi-Price Inc. and in 1981 it was taken over by Olympia and York Developments Ltd. In 1982, Abitibi-Price bought out the Hilroy companies, whose founder, Roy Hill, had been a member of the Abitibi board of directors and had died in 1978. With the purchase of Hilroy, Abitibi-Price became the premiere vertically-integrated supplier of office stationery in the Canadian market. The collapse of Olympia and York in 1992 resulted in the consortium of banks being forced to take control of Abitibi-Price Inc. for a short time until they sold it through a public share issue in 1994. The share issue also entailed the divestment and sale of Hilroy to the Mead Corporation.

=== Consolidated ===
The Bathurst Power and Paper Company Ltd. built a mill in Bathurst, New Brunswick in 1914. Majority control of the company was obtained in the late 1930s by Arthur J. Nesbitt and his partner Peter A. T. Thomson through their holding company, Power Corporation of Canada. In the early 1960s, Power Corporation bought the Consolidated Paper Company. When Paul Desmarais acquired control of Power Corporation in 1968, the two companies were merged to become Consolidated-Bathurst Inc., which, in 1989, was sold to Stone Container Corporation of Chicago, Illinois who renamed it Stone Consolidated Inc.

=== Acquisitions ===
In 2000, Abitibi-Consolidated acquired a majority shareholding in Canadian integrated forest products company Donohue Inc.

== Merger with Bowater ==
On January 29, 2007, Bowater and Abitibi-Consolidated announced they would be merging to create AbitibiBowater. The merger created the third largest pulp and paper company in North America, and the eighth largest in the world. Following the merger, Abitibi-Consolidated was rated B1, B+ and B+ by Moody's, Standard & Poor's and Fitch Ratings respectively.
