= Ernest Cimon =

Canadian politician

Marie Honorius Ernest Cimon
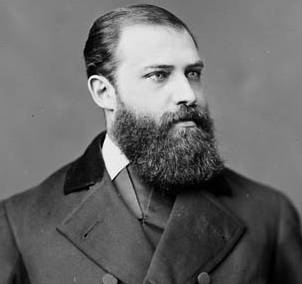

Member of the Canadian Parliament for Chicoutimi—Saguenay
- In office 1874–1882
- Preceded by: William Evan Price
- Succeeded by: Jean Alfred Gagné

Personal details
- Born: March 30, 1848 Murray Bay, Canada East
- Died: July 17, 1917 (aged 69)
- Party: Conservative
- Relations: Louis Côté, son-in-law Hector-Louis Langevin, father-in-law

Ernest Cimon (March 30, 1848 – July 17, 1917) was a Quebec lawyer, judge and political figure. He represented Chicoutimi—Saguenay in the House of Commons of Canada as a Conservative member from 1874 to 1882. His name also appears as Marie Honorius Ernest Cimon.

He was born at Murray Bay, Canada East in 1848, the son of notary Cléophe Cimon, who represented Charlevoix in the legislative assembly for the Province of Quebec. Cimon studied at the Université Laval, was called to the bar in 1871 and set up practice at Chicoutimi. He served as Crown Prosecutor there and also as mayor. In 1882, he was named to the Quebec Superior Court for Gaspé district, later serving in Joliette, Kamouraska and Montmagny districts. In 1891, Cimon married Stella, the daughter of Hector-Louis Langevin. He retired from the bench in 1914.

Cimon died at Quebec City in 1917.

His daughter Stella married Louis Côté, who later served in the Canadian senate.
