= Canadian International Paper Company =

Canadian forest products company

- Industry: Pulp and paper
- Founded: 22 December 1916
- Defunct: 2 June 1988
- Fate: Merged with Great Lakes Paper
- Successor: Canadian Pacific Forest Products
- Headquarters: Montreal, Quebec
- Parent: International Paper

The Canadian International Paper Company (CIP) was a Montreal-based forest products company, a former subsidiary of International Paper. It was originally formed as the St. Maurice Lumber Company in 1919 but was renamed in 1925. It was sold to Canadian Pacific Forest Products in the early 1980s, which became Avenor Inc. in 1994; this company was then bought by Bowater in 1998.

The company operated plants in Gatineau, Trois-Rivières, Témiscaming, La Tuque, Matane, Hawkesbury, Grand Falls and Corner Brook and Dalhousie, New Brunswick .

This company set up the Gatineau Power Company which established hydroelectric plants on the lower Gatineau River. Now, these plants are operated by Hydro-Québec.

The mill in Témiscaming was originally built by the Riordon Pulp and Paper Company, later bought by CIP. When CIP wanted to close its mill in this one-industry town, the employees formed Tembec to take over the operation. The research department of CIP was begun in 1923 by the Riordon Company, two years prior to the acquisition of Riordon by CIP.
