= Louis Côté (politician) =

Canadian politician

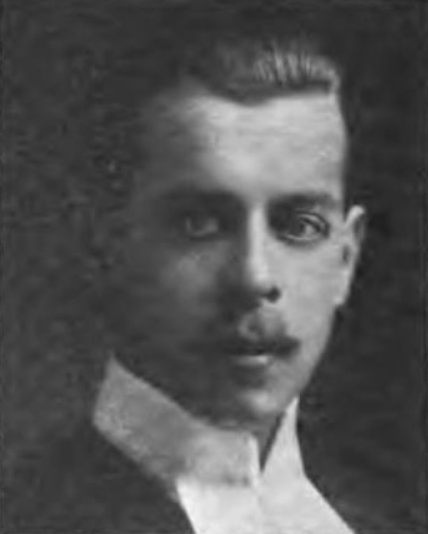

Canadian Senator from Ontario
- In office 1933–1943

Member of the Ontario Provincial Parliament Ottawa East
- In office 1929–1934

Personal details
- Born: September 13, 1890 Ottawa, Ontario, Canada
- Died: February 2, 1943 (aged 52) Ottawa, Ontario, Canada
- Party: Conservative (provincial); Conservative (federal)
- Spouse: Stella Cimon (m. 1922)
- Education: University of Ottawa
- Occupation: Politician; lawyer

Louis Côté (September 13, 1890 – February 2, 1943) was a Canadian politician and lawyer. He represented Ottawa East in the Legislative Assembly of Ontario as a Conservative from 1929 to 1934 and was also a Conservative member of the Senate of Canada for Ottawa East division from 1933 to 1943.

== Biography ==
He was born in Ottawa in 1890 and studied at the University of Ottawa and Osgoode Hall. Côté married Stella, the daughter of judge Ernest Cimon and granddaughter of Hector-Louis Langevin, in 1922. He was a member of the Scott-Merchant-Côté Commission which recommended the creation of a bilingual school system for Franco-Ontarians.

Côté died of a heart attack at Ottawa's Union train station in 1943 while still serving as a senator.
