= Edmond Savard =

Canadian politician

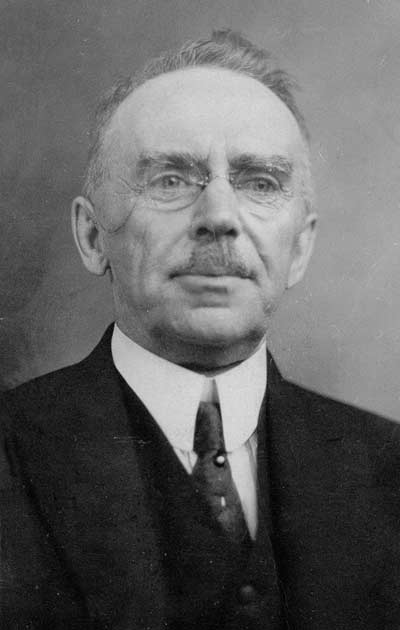
- Physician and political figure in Quebec

Member of the Canadian Parliament for Chicoutimi—Saguenay
- In office 1917–1925
- Preceded by: Joseph Girard
- Succeeded by: District was abolished in 1924

Personal details
- Born: October 26, 1862 Les Éboulements, Canada East
- Died: October 22, 1925 (aged 62)
- Party: Liberal
- Relations: Paul Vilmond Savard, brother

Edmond Savard (October 26, 1862 – October 22, 1925) was a physician and political figure in Quebec. He represented Chicoutimi—Saguenay in the House of Commons of Canada from 1917 to 1925 as a Liberal.

He was born in Les Éboulements, Canada East, the son of Idas Savard and Démérise Tremblay, and was educated at the Séminaire de Chicoutimi and the Université Laval. Savard practised medicine in Chicoutimi. In 1889, he married Éva Robitaille. He served with Les Voltigeurs de Québec during the North-West Rebellion. Savard was mayor of Chicoutimi from 1902 to 1906. He served as coroner for Chicoutimi from 1904 to 1908 and was sheriff from 1907 to 1917. Savard was defeated by Joseph Girard when he ran a seat in the House of Commons in 1904. He died in Chicoutimi at the age of 62 a week before the 1925 federal election.

His brother Paul Vilmond also served in the House of Commons.
