= Jean Alfred Gagné =

Canadian politician

The Honourable Jean-Alfred Gagné
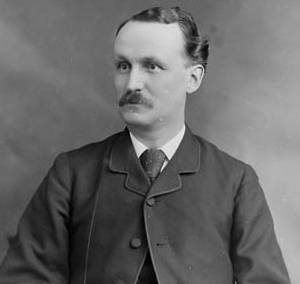

Member of the Canadian Parliament for Chicoutimi—Saguenay
- In office 1872–1887
- Preceded by: Ernest Cimon
- Succeeded by: Paul Couture

Personal details
- Born: April 17, 1842 Murray Bay, Canada East
- Died: August 8, 1910 (aged 68)
- Party: Conservative

Jean-Alfred Gagné (April 17, 1842 – August 8, 1910) was a lawyer, merchant, judge and political figure in Quebec. He represented Chicoutimi—Saguenay in the House of Commons of Canada from 1882 to 1887 as a Conservative member.

He was born in La Malbaie, Canada East, the son of Jean Gagné and Christine Blackburn and was educated at the Seminaire de Québec. Gagné was called to the Lower Canada bar in 1864 and set up practice in Chicoutimi. In 1864, he married Marie Emilie Louise Guay, the sister of Joseph-Dominique Guay. Gagné was an unsuccessful candidate in the 1872 and 1878 federal elections. He was defeated when he ran for reelection in 1887. In 1889, he was named a judge in the Quebec Superior Court for Chicoutimi district. He died in Quebec City at the age of 68.
