= Nepisiguit Falls =

Hydroelectric dam in New Brunswick, Canada

Nepisiguit (Grand) Falls Generating Station
- Interactive map of Nepisiguit (Grand) Falls Generating Station
- Country: Canada
- Location: Bathurst Parish, Gloucester County, New Brunswick
- Coordinates: 47.4054°N 65.7919°W
- Purpose: Hydroelectric power
- Status: Operational
- Construction began: 1924 (1.5 years construction time)
- Opening date: 1926
- Owner: NB Power corporation (since early 1950s)
- Operator: NB Power corporation

Dam and spillways
- Impounds: Nepisiguit River

Nepisiguit (Grand) Falls Generating Station
- Operator: NB Power corporation
- Commission date: 1926
- Type: Hydroelectric
- Turbines: 3
- Installed capacity: 11 megawatts (as of 2016)

The Nepisiguit (Grand) Falls generating station is a hydroelectric dam built in the Canadian province of New Brunswick and is operated by NB Power corporation. It was purchased by the NB Electric Power Commission in the early 1950s from the Bathurst Power and Paper Company.

== History ==
The hydroelectric power dam was constructed in a year and a half by 400 men. Its turbines were installed by 1926, the year of its commission to service.

It was first projected when the Great Falls Water Power and Boom Co. acquired the interests in the north-east bank of the river from the Dominion of Canada. In 1905, a rival power company, the Grand Falls Power Co. acquired the interests on the south-west bank from the province of New Brunswick.

Its power house has as of 2016 a capacity of 11 megawatts from its three turbines. It is located in Bathurst Parish, Gloucester County.
