= Pierre Desjardins =

Canadian gridiron football player (born 1941)

Profile
- Positions: Guard, Offensive tackle

Personal information
- Born: October 28, 1941 (age 85); Montreal, Quebec, Canada
- Listed height: 6 ft 0 in (1.83 m)
- Listed weight: 240 lb (109 kg)

Career information
- College: University of Wyoming

Career history
- 1966–1971: Montreal Alouettes

Awards and highlights
- Grey Cup champion (1970)

Pierre Desjardins (born October 28, 1941) is a Canadian former professional football player with the Canadian Football League's Montreal Alouettes. Desjardins was an offensive lineman at the guard and tackle positions during his six-year career (1966–1971) with the club. Desjardins' jersey #63 is one of seven retired by the Alouettes.

Desjardins is currently a Canadian businessman, previously serving on the board of directors for Canadian businesses such as Domtar, Labatt Brewing Company, and Imperial Tobacco.

== College career ==
Desjardins was born and raised in Montreal, and played amateur Canadian football for the Quebec Junior Football League Rosemont Bombers. He played collegiately at the University of Wyoming prior to joining the Als.

== Professional football career ==
Following his graduation from Wyoming, where he earned a business degree, Desjardins returned to Montreal and began his professional career with the CFL Alouettes in 1966. Desjardins was an offensive lineman at the guard and tackle positions during his six-year career (1966-1971) with the Als. Along with Pierre Dumont he was one of the first French-Canadians to play for the Larks.

Desjardins, as co-captain of the team (along with co-captain, Larry Fairholm), helped turn around a then-mediocre Alouettes team, eventually reaching and winning the Grey Cup in 1970. Desjardins retired following the Alouettes' 1971 CFL season.

== Post-football career ==
Following his playing days, Desjardins was a sportscaster with the Canadian Broadcasting Corporation. He also served as an executive with Canadian companies such as Domtar, Labatt Brewing Company, and Imperial Tobacco.
