= Louis de Gonzague Belley =

Canadian politician (1863–1930)

The Honourable Louis de Gonzague Belley PC, KC
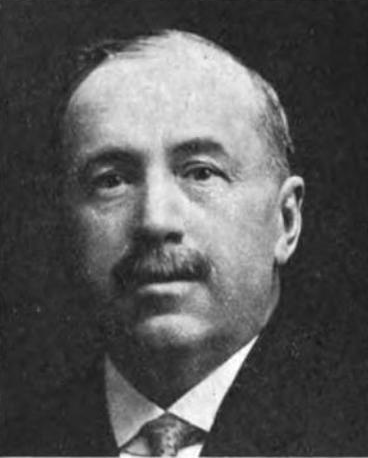

Member of the Canadian Parliament for Chicoutimi—Saguenay
- In office 1892–1896
- Preceded by: Paul Vilmond Savard
- Succeeded by: Paul Vilmond Savard

Personal details
- Born: February 3, 1863 St-Alexis de la Grande Baie, Canada East
- Died: July 9, 1930 (aged 67) Quebec City, Quebec
- Party: Conservative

Louis de Gonzague Belley, PC, KC (February 3, 1863 – July 9, 1930) was a Canadian politician.

Born in St-Alexis de la Grande Baie, Canada East, he was a lawyer before being acclaimed at the age of 29 to the House of Commons of Canada for the Quebec riding of Chicoutimi—Saguenay in an 1892 by-election. A Conservative, he was defeated in the 1896 election. In September 1921, he was appointed Postmaster General in the cabinet of Arthur Meighen. He was defeated in the 1921 federal election.

He died at his home in Quebec City on July 9, 1930.
