= Paul Vilmond Savard =

Canadian politician

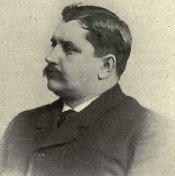

Member of the Canadian Parliament for Chicoutimi—Saguenay
- In office 1891–1892
- Preceded by: Paul Couture
- Succeeded by: Louis-de-Gonzague Belley
- In office 1896–1900
- Preceded by: Louis-de-Gonzague Belley
- Succeeded by: Joseph Girard

Personal details
- Born: July 28, 1864 Les Éboulements, Canada East
- Died: August 21, 1908 (aged 44) Chicoutimi, Quebec
- Party: Liberal
- Relations: Edmond Savard, brother

Paul Vilmond Savard (July 28, 1864 – August 21, 1908) was a Canadian politician.

Born in Les Éboulements, County of Charlevoix, Canada East, the son of Idas Savard and Démérise Tremblay, Savard received his early education at the Seminary of Chicoutimi. He also studied at the Université Laval, where he graduated in Law in 1886. Savard was called to the Quebec bar in 1886 and practised law in Chicoutimi. In 1889, he married Marie-Louise Dufresne. He was an unsuccessful candidate in the Legislative Assembly of Quebec at the general elections of 1890. He was first elected to the House of Commons of Canada for the electoral district of Chicoutimi—Saguenay in the general elections of 1891, but was unseated. A Liberal, he was re-elected in the general elections of 1896 and was defeated in 1900. He died in Chicoutimi at the age of 44.

His brother Edmond also served as a member of the House of Commons.
