= Joseph Girard (Canadian politician) =

Canadian politician

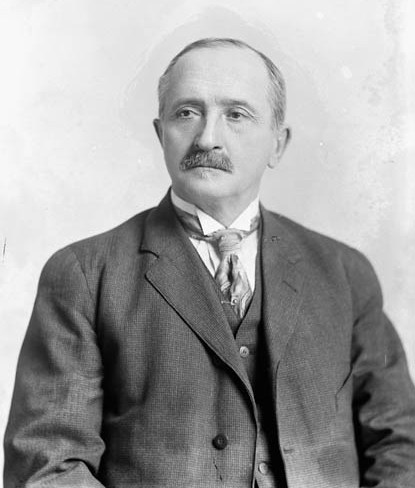

Member of the Canadian Parliament for Chicoutimi—Saguenay
- In office 1900–1911
- Preceded by: Paul Vilmond Savard
- Succeeded by: Edmond Savard

MLA for Lac-Saint-Jean
- In office 1892–1900
- Preceded by: Pierre-Léandre Marcotte
- Succeeded by: Georges Tanguay

Personal details
- Born: August 2, 1853 Saint-Urbain, Canada East
- Died: April 3, 1933 (aged 79) Saint-Gédéon, Quebec
- Party: Conservative
- Other political affiliations: Quebec Conservative Party

Joseph Girard (French pronunciation: [ʒozɛf ʒiʁaʁ]; August 2, 1853 – April 3, 1933) was a Canadian politician.

He was elected to the National Assembly of Quebec for Lac-Saint-Jean at the general elections of 1892 and re-elected in 1897. A Conservative, Girard was first elected in 1900 from the riding of Chicoutimi—Saguenay. He remained in parliament for seventeen years until his defeat in the Conscription crisis election of 1917 when he ran as a supporter of the Conservative-Unionist government's conscription policy.
