= Paul Couture (Canadian politician) =

Canadian politician (1833–1913)

Member of the Canadian Parliament for Chicoutimi—Saguenay
- In office 1887–1891
- Preceded by: Jean Alfred Gagné
- Succeeded by: Paul Vilmond Savard

Personal details
- Born: April 15, 1833 St-Charles, Lower Canada
- Died: November 30, 1913 (aged 80)
- Party: Independent

Paul Couture (April 15, 1833 – November 30, 1913) was a dairy farmer and political figure in Quebec. He represented Chicoutimi—Saguenay in the House of Commons of Canada from 1887 to 1891 as an Independent member.

He was born in Saint-Charles, Bellechasse County, Lower Canada. In 1857, he married Philomène Boulanger. He operated a butter and cheese factory at Laterrière; Couture established this facility in 1883 with his brother Octave as a model facility to educate others in the region in the production of butter. He was also involved in the production of wool.
