= William Price (merchant) =

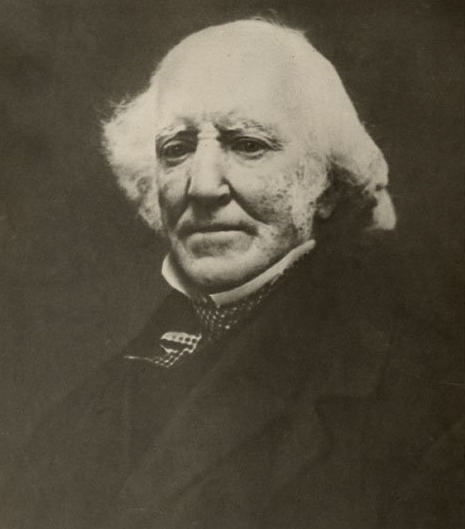
- Born: 17 September 1789; Hornsey, north London, England
- Died: 14 March 1867 (aged 77); Sillery, Canada East
- Resting place: Mount Hermon Cemetery
- Occupation: Timber merchant
- Known for: Founder of timber firm that later became Price Brothers
- Spouse: Jane Stewart
- Children: David Edward Price; William Evan Price; Evans John Price

William Price (17 September 1789 – 14 March 1867) was a Quebec lumber merchant and manufacturer.

Price was born at Hornsey, now in the London Borough of Haringey, England, to Richard Price and Mary Evans, a family that was originally from Wales in 1789. He studied law at the Inner Temple but found his way to Quebec in 1810 and served in the local militia during the War of 1812. Price took over a food supplier in 1815, and by 1820 formed the William Price Company as a produce shipping company and later into timber.

William Price and his wife, Jane Stewart, had 14 children, seven daughters and seven sons, three of whom included William Evan Price, David Edward Price, and Evans John Price. The family resided at the Wolfesfield (or Wolfe's Field) estate in Sillery, which Price had purchased in 1828.

Price founded a Quebec-based timber firm, William Price Company, which later would become Price Brothers Limited.

Price died at his Wolfesfield estate in 1867, and was buried at nearby Mount Hermon Cemetery.
