= Témiscaming =

- City
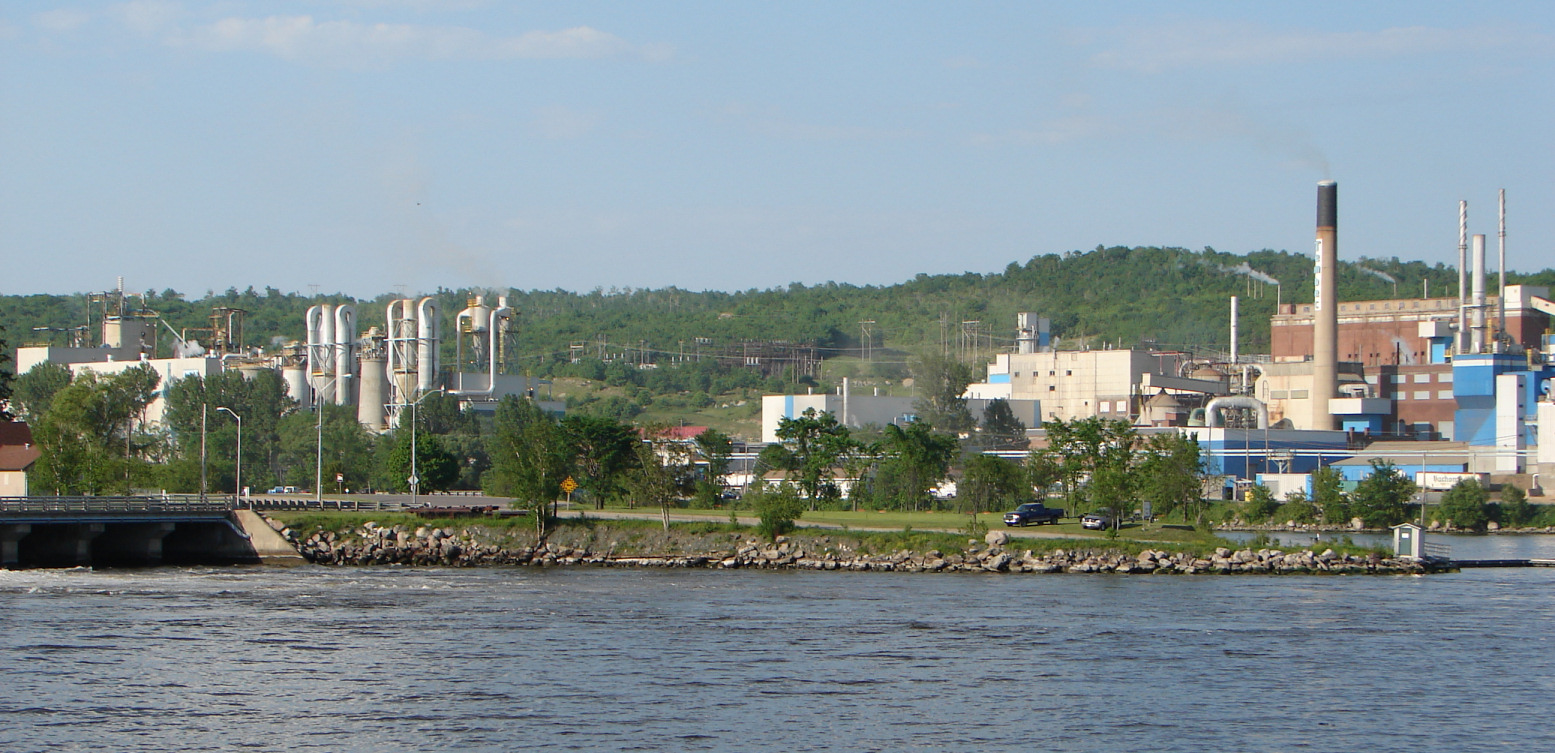
- The mill on the Ottawa River at Témiscaming
- Motto: Vive la Forêt ("Long Live the Forest")
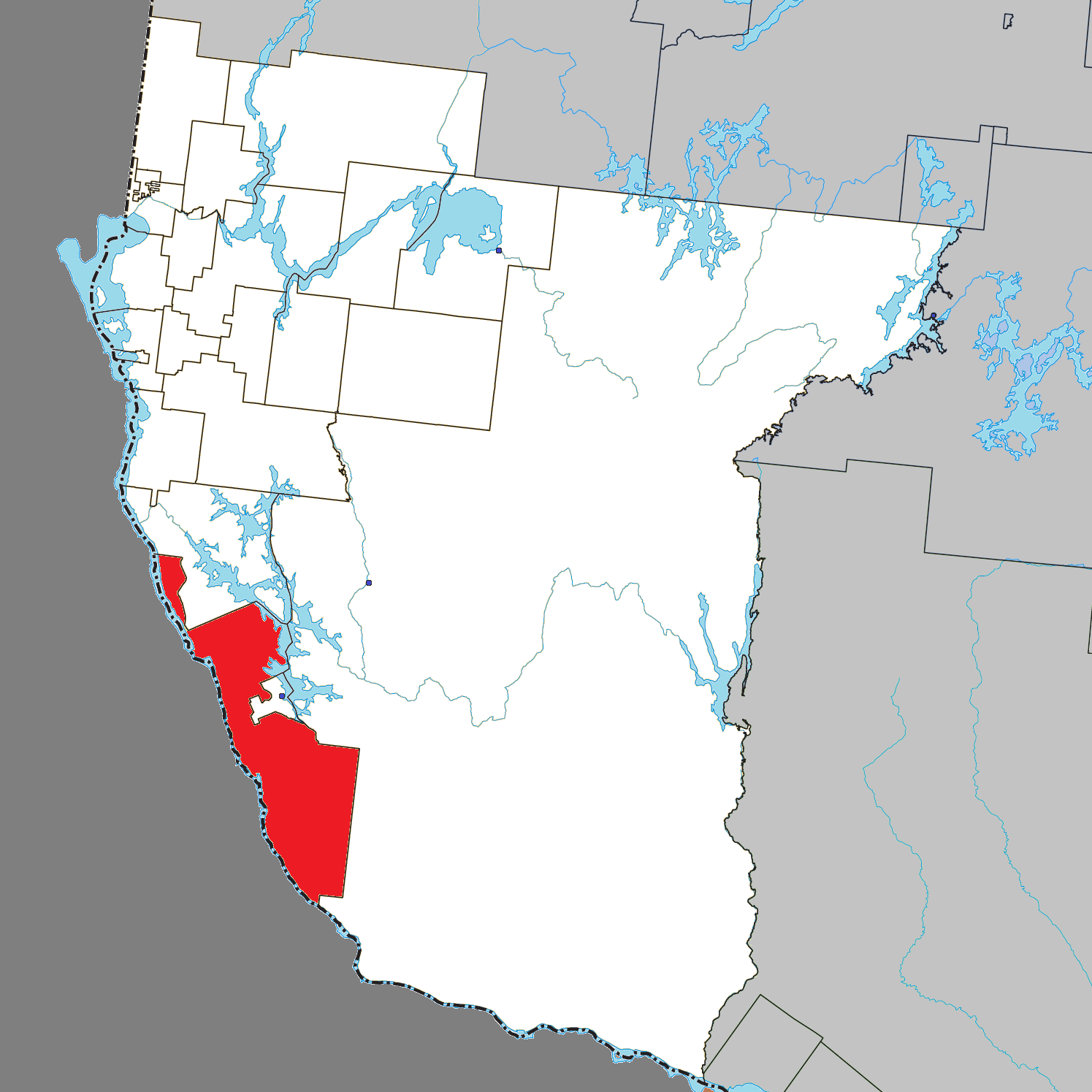
- Location within Témiscamingue RCM

- Location in western Quebec
- Coordinates: 46°43′N 79°06′W
- Country: Canada
- Province: Quebec
- Region: Abitibi-Témiscamingue
- RCM: Témiscamingue
- Settled: 1880
- Constituted: March 26, 1988

Government
  - Mayor: Alain Gauthier
  - Federal riding: Abitibi—Témiscamingue
  - Prov. riding: Rouyn-Noranda–Témiscamingue

Area
  - Total: 862.89 km^{2} (333.16 sq mi)
  - Land: 710.84 km^{2} (274.46 sq mi)
- Elevation: 240 m (790 ft)

Population (2021)
  - Total: 2,368
  - Density: 3.3/km^{2} (8.5/sq mi)
  - Pop (2016–21): ▼2.6%
  - Dwellings: 1,407
- Time zone: UTC−5 (EST)
  - Summer (DST): UTC−4 (EDT)
- Postal code(s): J0Z 3R0
- Area code: 819
- Highways: R-101
- Website: www.temiscaming.net

Témiscaming (French pronunciation: [temiskamɛ̃ɡ, -miŋ]) is a city located at the south end of Lac Témiscamingue on the upper Ottawa River in the Témiscamingue Regional County Municipality of western Quebec, Canada. Also nearby is Lake Kipawa.

It is the administrative headquarters of the Algonquin Nation Wolf Lake First Nations band government.

== History ==
The Ottawa River had long been used by Indigenous peoples, colonial explorers, coureurs des bois, and missionaries as transportation route through the region. Some of the notable travellers passing by Témiscaming were Radisson and des Groseilliers, Saint-Lusson, Charles le Moyne and Pierre Le Moyne, and Chevalier de Troyes. A small chapel had existed there for the trappers and fur traders en route to Ottawa.

The area began to be developed circa 1850 when forestry companies began logging the land. Some of these logging crews had brought their families, and together with some pioneer families, they had formed a settlement of about 13 families by 1880. It was originally called "Long Sault", taken from the name of the rapids on the Ottawa River at this place. From 1884 on, Long Sault became an important stopover for colonists travelling upstream to Lake Timiskaming, leading to the construction of a hotel, wharves, stores, and a railroad to Mattawa. On August 12, 1886, the first train arrived at Long Sault, also called Gordon's Creek by then.

In 1888, the Municipality of Témiscaming was officially incorporated. Its name, also spelled Témiskaming, was taken from Lake Timiskaming and in turn came from the Algonquin tim ("deep"), and kami ("open water"). In the fall of that same year, Alex Lumsden built a sawmill on Gordon Creek and the settlement came to be known as Lumsden's Mill. Around 1909 work began on the dam across the Ottawa River.

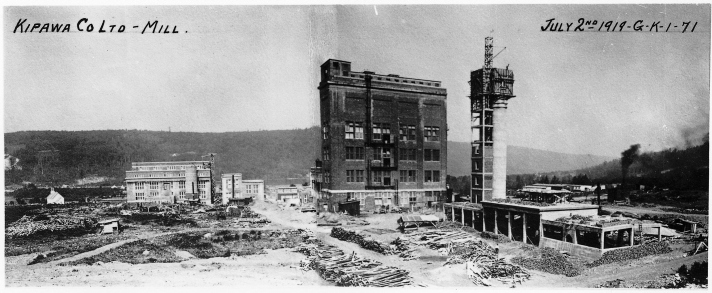
Construction of Kipawa Co. Ltd. mill, 1919

The place experienced major growth when the Riordon Pulp and Paper Company built the Kipawa Mills pulp and paper mill there in 1918. It bought the Lumsden Mill as well as all the property in Long Sault. For all the construction workers and mill employees, a new town was built, designed according to a Garden City plan by Scottish architect Thomas Adams.

In 1920, Témiscaming gained town status under the name "Kipawa" but the name was replaced by the original name the following year. On paper, there was a municipal council, but in reality, Témiscaming was a company town. The Canadian International Paper Company, that had bought out the Riordon Company in 1925, had total control by owning every property, appointing the mayor and council members, and even applying the law. No municipal elections were held for 35 years.

On November 1, 1935, a magnitude 6.1 earthquake had its epicentre approximately 10 km (6.2 mi) northeast of Témiscaming. In 1936, the road between North Bay and Témiscaming was completed. In 1956, the Canadian International Paper Company declared Témiscaming as an "open town" and sold all its infrastructure. W.N. Irwin became the town's first mayor elected in a municipal election. In 1972, when the company decided to close the mill, the employees formed Tembec to take over the operation of the mill.

In 1988, the Municipality of Letang (incorporated in 1980) was merged into Témiscaming.

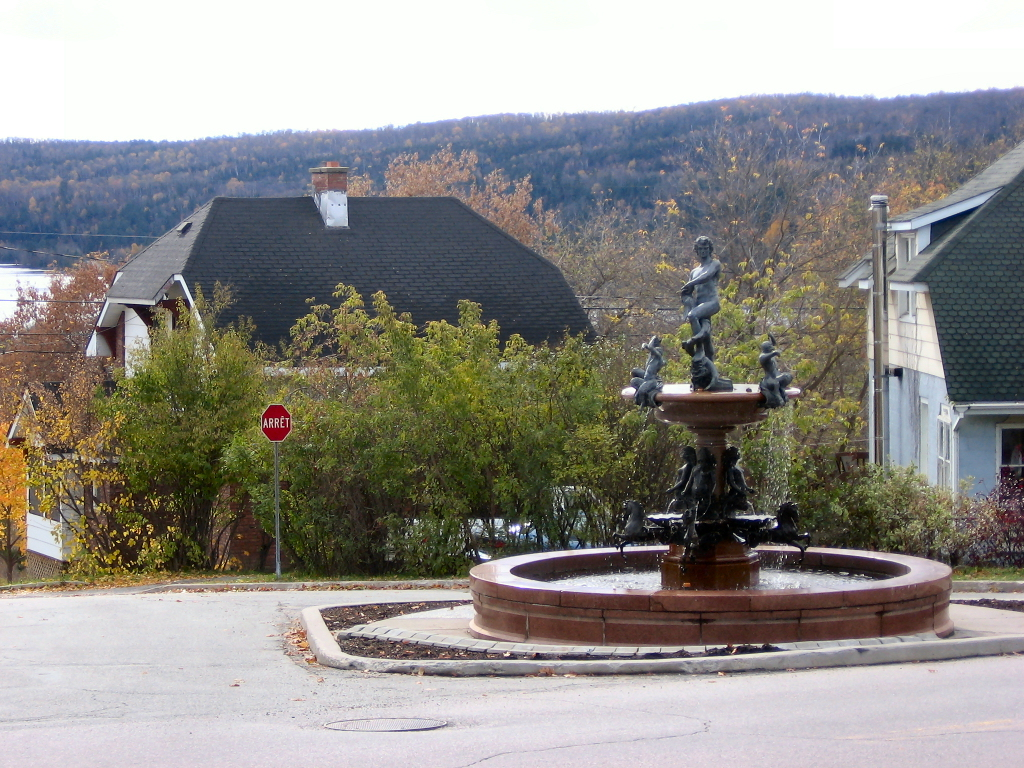
Italian fountain in downtown Temiscaming. It is one of several such features in the city erected by a former mill manager in 1930.

== Climate ==
Climate data for Témiscaming (1991−2020 normals, extremes 1910–present)
Month	Jan	Feb	Mar	Apr	May	Jun	Jul	Aug	Sep	Oct	Nov	Dec	Year
Record high °C (°F)	14.4 (57.9)	14.0 (57.2)	27.3 (81.1)	30.6 (87.1)	33.9 (93.0)	36.7 (98.1)	40.0 (104.0)	36.1 (97.0)	34.4 (93.9)	28.9 (84.0)	22.6 (72.7)	16.0 (60.8)	40.0 (104.0)
Mean daily maximum °C (°F)	−6.3 (20.7)	−4.3 (24.3)	1.9 (35.4)	9.3 (48.7)	17.8 (64.0)	22.9 (73.2)	25.5 (77.9)	24.1 (75.4)	19.4 (66.9)	11.6 (52.9)	4.0 (39.2)	−2.6 (27.3)	10.3 (50.5)
Daily mean °C (°F)	−11.2 (11.8)	−9.8 (14.4)	−4.0 (24.8)	3.7 (38.7)	10.9 (51.6)	16.5 (61.7)	19.6 (67.3)	18.7 (65.7)	14.2 (57.6)	7.5 (45.5)	0.5 (32.9)	−6.5 (20.3)	5.0 (41.0)
Mean daily minimum °C (°F)	−16.0 (3.2)	−15.2 (4.6)	−9.8 (14.4)	−2.1 (28.2)	3.9 (39.0)	10.1 (50.2)	13.6 (56.5)	13.2 (55.8)	9.0 (48.2)	3.4 (38.1)	−3.0 (26.6)	−10.2 (13.6)	−0.3 (31.5)
Record low °C (°F)	−40.0 (−40.0)	−43.9 (−47.0)	−36.1 (−33.0)	−24.4 (−11.9)	−8.9 (16.0)	−2.8 (27.0)	−1.1 (30.0)	−0.6 (30.9)	−5.6 (21.9)	−11.1 (12.0)	−23.3 (−9.9)	−39.4 (−38.9)	−43.9 (−47.0)
Average precipitation mm (inches)	62.7 (2.47)	47.5 (1.87)	64.5 (2.54)	65.9 (2.59)	72.8 (2.87)	93.0 (3.66)	103.4 (4.07)	96.8 (3.81)	100.0 (3.94)	82.0 (3.23)	79.3 (3.12)	69.0 (2.72)	937.0 (36.89)
Average rainfall mm (inches)	9.6 (0.38)	7.2 (0.28)	31.2 (1.23)	55.0 (2.17)	71.7 (2.82)	93.0 (3.66)	103.4 (4.07)	96.8 (3.81)	99.9 (3.93)	79.9 (3.15)	51.6 (2.03)	18.2 (0.72)	717.5 (28.25)
Average snowfall cm (inches)	53.1 (20.9)	40.3 (15.9)	33.3 (13.1)	10.9 (4.3)	1.2 (0.5)	0.0 (0.0)	0.0 (0.0)	0.0 (0.0)	0.0 (0.0)	2.1 (0.8)	27.3 (10.7)	51.0 (20.1)	219.3 (86.3)
Average precipitation days (≥ 0.2 mm)	17	13	14	12	13	14	14	14	15	15	17	19	177
Average rainy days (≥ 0.2 mm)	2	2	5	10	12	14	14	14	15	15	10	3	116
Average snowy days (≥ 0.2 cm)	16	12	10	4	0	0	0	0	0	0	9	16	68
Average relative humidity (%) (at 15:00 LST)	73.7	63.2	53.3	49.1	48.0	53.8	52.6	55.7	60.2	64.0	72.4	75.9	60.2
Mean monthly sunshine hours	81.9	108.3	147.2	176.1	255.6	207.1	250.1	226.9	141.2	100.2	59.8	65.6	1,790
Source: Environment and Climate Change Canada (precipitation/rain/snow 1961–1990, and sun 1951–1980)

== Demographics ==
In the 2021 Census of Population conducted by Statistics Canada, Témiscaming had a population of 2,368 living in 1,114 of its 1,407 total private dwellings, a change of −2.6% from its 2016 population of 2,431. With a land area of 710.84 km^{2} (274.46 sq mi), it had a population density of 3.3/km^{2} (8.6/sq mi) in 2021.

Mother tongue (according to the 2021 Canadian census):

- English as first language: 33.7%
- French as first language: 61.0%
- English and French as first language: 3.6%
- Other as first language: 1.5%

Historical census populations – Témiscaming

Year	Pop.	±%
1921	1,021	—
1931	1,855	+81.7%
1941	2,168	+16.9%
1951	2,787	+28.6%
1956	2,694	−3.3%
1961	2,517	−6.6%

Year	Pop.	±%
1966	2,799	+11.2%
1971	2,428	−13.3%
1976	2,165	−10.8%
1981	2,097	−3.1%
1986	2,071	−1.2%
1991	2,944	+42.2%

Year	Pop.	±%
1996	3,112	+5.7%
2001	2,903	−6.7%
2006	2,697	−7.1%
2011	2,385	−11.6%
2016	2,431	+1.9%
2021	2,368	−2.6%

Population counts are not adjusted for boundary changes.
Source: Statistics Canada

Historical census populations – Letang
Year	Pop.	±%
1976	487	—
1981	512	+5.1%
1986	475	−7.2%
In 1988, Letang was dissolved and merged into Temiscaming. Source: Statistics Canada

== Arts and culture ==
=== In popular culture ===
In 2014, on the American late-night talk show Conan, Canadian comedian Norm Macdonald told a fictional story about a person, Jacques de Gatineau (previously named Jacques de Gautier, until he "grew"), who was supposed to have come from Témiscaming, Quebec. The clip is uploaded to the official Conan O'Brien's "Team Coco" channel on YouTube as "The Most Convoluted Joke Ever", where it has been seen more than 7.2 million times, as of September 2026.

== Sports ==
From the 2007-2011, Témiscaming is the home of the Temiscaming Royals Junior "A" ice hockey team of the Ontario-based Northern Ontario Junior Hockey League.

Since 2011, the city of Témiscaming has a team called the Temiscaming Titans, a junior ice hockey team that are members of the Greater Metro Junior Hockey League.

== Government ==
List of former mayors:

- Philippe Barette (1993–2013)
- Nicole Rochon (2013–2017)
- Yves Ouellet (2017–2021)
- Pierre Gingras (2021–2025)

== Media ==
CKVM-FM, a community radio station based in Ville-Marie has a retransmitter in Témiscaming.

The Tem Times was the city's first newspaper (officially categorized as a country weekly) which ran from 1950 through to 1972. Produced on a Gestener by local townspeople who were members of the Temiskaming Debating Club, and subsidized by the CIP, the circulation at its height was estimated at 1,000. Gord McCulloch, who edited the paper for twenty-two years, went on to become a district editor and columnist for The North Bay Nugget.

== See also ==
- List of anglophone communities in Quebec
- List of cities in Quebec
