= William Evan Price =

Canadian politician

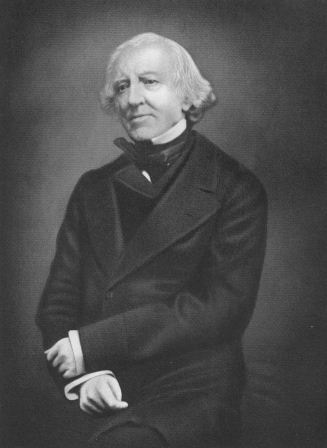

Member of the Canadian Parliament for Chicoutimi—Saguenay
- In office 1872–1874
- Preceded by: Pierre-Alexis Tremblay
- Succeeded by: Ernest Cimon

Member of the Legislative Assembly of Quebec for Chicoutimi-Saguenay
- In office 1875–1880
- Preceded by: Michel Guillaume Baby
- Succeeded by: Joseph-Élisée Beaudet

Personal details
- Born: November 17, 1827 Wolfesfield Estate, Sillery, Quebec, Lower Canada
- Died: June 12, 1880 (aged 52) Wolfesfield Estate, Sillery, Quebec, Canada
- Resting place: Mount Hermon Cemetery, Sillery, Quebec, Canada
- Party: Conservative
- Parent(s): William Price; Jane Stewart
- Relatives: Evans John Price (brother); David Edward Price (brother)

William Evan Price (November 17, 1827 – June 12, 1880) was a businessman and political figure in Quebec, Canada. He was a Conservative Member of Parliament representing Chicoutimi-Saguenay from 1872 to 1874.

== Biography ==
He was born at the Wolfesfield (or Wolfe's Field) Estate (domaine Wolfesfield) in Sillery, in 1827, the son of William Price, a timber baron in the Saguenay region. He joined his father's business, William Price and Company, in the Chicoutimi area. In 1867, with his brothers David Edward and Evans John, he started Price Brothers and Company, which took over the assets of his father's company. In 1872, he defeated Pierre-Alexis Tremblay for a seat in the House of Commons. Although Protestant, he supported the development of Catholic schools in the region. In 1875, he was elected to the Quebec National Assembly in the same riding. He was reelected in 1878 but resigned from his seat in February 1880 because of health problems.

He died at the family estate of Wolfesfield in Sillery, in 1880. Price was buried at Mount Hermon Cemetery in Sillery. A monument was built in his honour at Chicoutimi in 1882. The village of Price, Quebec is named after him.
