= Chicoutimi—Saguenay (federal electoral district) =

Former federal electoral district in Quebec, Canada

Coordinates: 48.418°N 71.080°W

Quebec electoral district

Defunct federal electoral district
- Legislature: House of Commons
- District created: 1867
- District abolished: 1924
- First contested: 1867
- Last contested: 1921

Chicoutimi—Saguenay was a federal electoral district in Quebec, Canada, that was represented in the House of Commons of Canada from 1867 to 1925.

It was created by the British North America Act, 1867, and was redistributed into the Chicoutimi, Charlevoix—Saguenay, and Lake St. John electoral districts in 1924.

== Members of Parliament ==
This riding elected the following members of Parliament:

Parliament	Years	Member	Party
Chicoutimi—Saguenay
1st	1867–1872	Pierre-Alexis Tremblay	Liberal
2nd	1872–1874	William Evan Price	Liberal
3rd	1874–1878	Ernest Cimon	Conservative
4th	1878–1882	Ernest Cimon	Conservative
5th	1882–1887	Jean Alfred Gagné	Conservative
6th	1887–1891	Paul Couture	Independent
7th	1891–1892	Paul Vilmond Savard	Liberal
7th	1892–1896	Louis de Gonzague Belley	Conservative
8th	1896–1900	Paul Vilmond Savard	Liberal
9th	1900–1904	Joseph Girard	Conservative
10th	1904–1908	Joseph Girard	Conservative
11th	1908–1911	Joseph Girard	Conservative
12th	1911–1917	Joseph Girard	Independent Conservative
13th	1917–1921	Edmond Savard	Opposition (Laurier Liberals)
14th	1921–1925	Edmond Savard	Liberal
Riding dissolved into Chicoutimi, Charlevoix—Saguenay and Lake St. John

== Election results ==
1867 Canadian federal election
Party	Candidate	Votes
Liberal	Pierre Alexis Tremblay	acclaimed

1872 Canadian federal election
Party	Candidate	Votes
Liberal	William Evan Price	955
Conservative	Jean Alfred Gagné	887

1874 Canadian federal election
Party	Candidate	Votes
Conservative	Ernest Cimon	1,145
Unknown	Mr. Hudon	743

1878 Canadian federal election
Party	Candidate	Votes
Conservative	Ernest Cimon	1,453
Conservative	Jean Alfred Gagné	1,158

1882 Canadian federal election
Party	Candidate	Votes
Conservative	Jean Alfred Gagné	1,773
Unknown	L.N. Catellier	657

1887 Canadian federal election
Party	Candidate	Votes
Independent	Paul Couture	1,209
Conservative	Jean Alfred Gagné	1,122
Nationalist	V.M. Martin	590

1891 Canadian federal election
Party	Candidate	Votes
Liberal	Paul Vilmond Savard	1,927
Conservative	Sir Adolphe-Philippe Caron	1,804

By-election: On Mr. Savard being unseated

By-election on 16 August 1892
Party	Candidate	Votes
Conservative	Louis de Gonzague Belley	acclaimed

1896 Canadian federal election
Party	Candidate	Votes
Liberal	Paul Vilmond Savard	3,059
Conservative	Louis de Gonzague Belley	1,973

1900 Canadian federal election
Party	Candidate	Votes
Conservative	Joseph Girard	3,130
Liberal	Paul Vilmond Savard	2,852

1904 Canadian federal election
Party	Candidate	Votes
Conservative	Joseph Girard	4,448
Independent	Edmond Savard	2,857

1908 Canadian federal election
Party	Candidate	Votes
Conservative	Joseph Girard	4,618
Unknown	Joseph Routhier	4,349

1911 Canadian federal election
Party	Candidate	Votes
Independent Conservative	Joseph Girard	3,798
Liberal	Benjamin Alexandre Scott	2,523
Independent	Elzéar Boivin	1,989
Independent	Elzéar Lévesque	1,531

1917 Canadian federal election
Party	Candidate	Votes
Opposition (Laurier Liberals)	Edmond Savard	11,002
Government (Unionist)	Joseph Girard	971

1921 Canadian federal election
Party	Candidate	Votes
Liberal	Edmond Savard	19,427
Conservative	Joseph Girard	4,728
Independent	Simon Lapointe	2,975

== See also ==
- List of Canadian electoral districts
- Historical federal electoral districts of Canada
