= Evan John Price =

Canadian politician

The Hon. Evan John Price
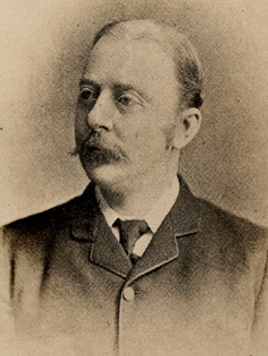

Senator for The Laurentides, Quebec
- In office December 1, 1888 – August 31, 1899
- Preceded by: James Gibb Ross
- Succeeded by: Joseph Shehyn

Personal details
- Born: May 8, 1840 Wolfesfield Estate, Sillery, Lower Canada
- Died: August 31, 1899 (aged 59) Wolfesfield Estate, Sillery, Canada
- Party: Conservative
- Parent(s): William Price; Jane Stewart
- Relatives: William Evan Price (brother); David Edward Price (brother)

Evan John Price (May 8, 1840 – August 31, 1899) was a Canadian lumber merchant and politician. Born at Wolfesfield (or Wolfe's Field) Estate in Sillery, the fourth son of William Price, a lumber merchant and Jane Stewart, he was educated in the UK. He was a partner in the lumbering, manufacturing and exporting company of Price Brothers and a Vice-President of the Union Bank of Canada. Price was appointed to the Senate representing the senatorial division of The Laurentides, Quebec on the advice of John Alexander Macdonald on December 1, 1888. A Conservative, he served almost 11 years until his death in 1899.
