= Donohue Inc. =

Donohue Incorporated
- Industry: pulp and paper
- Founded: 1920 as Murray River Power & Pulp Co. Ltd
- Defunct: 2000
- Successor: Abitibi-Consolidated Inc. (2000)
- Headquarters: Montreal, Canada
- Key people: Hubert T. Lacroix

Donohue Inc. was a Canadian company founded in 1920 as Murray River Power and Pulp Co. Limited and incorporated in Quebec. The company changed its name to Donohue Brothers Limited, in 1921, then to Donohue Company Limited, in 1970, and to Donohue Inc. in 1978. All shares were acquired by Abitibi-Consolidated Inc. in 2000 for $7.1 billion. The company was headquartered at 500 Sherbrooke Street West, Suite 800, Montreal, Quebec, Canada, H3A 3C6.
