= Tembec =

Canadian paper company

Tembec Industries Inc.
- Type: Public
- Traded as: TSX: TMB
- Industry: Paper and paper products
- Founder: Frank Dottori
- Defunct: 2017 (sold to Rayonier for 475,000,000 $CAD)
- Fate: Acquired by Rayonier Advanced Materials
- Headquarters: Montreal, Quebec, Canada
- Key people: James Lopez; Frank Dottori
- Number of employees: 3000 (2017)
- Website: www.tembec.com

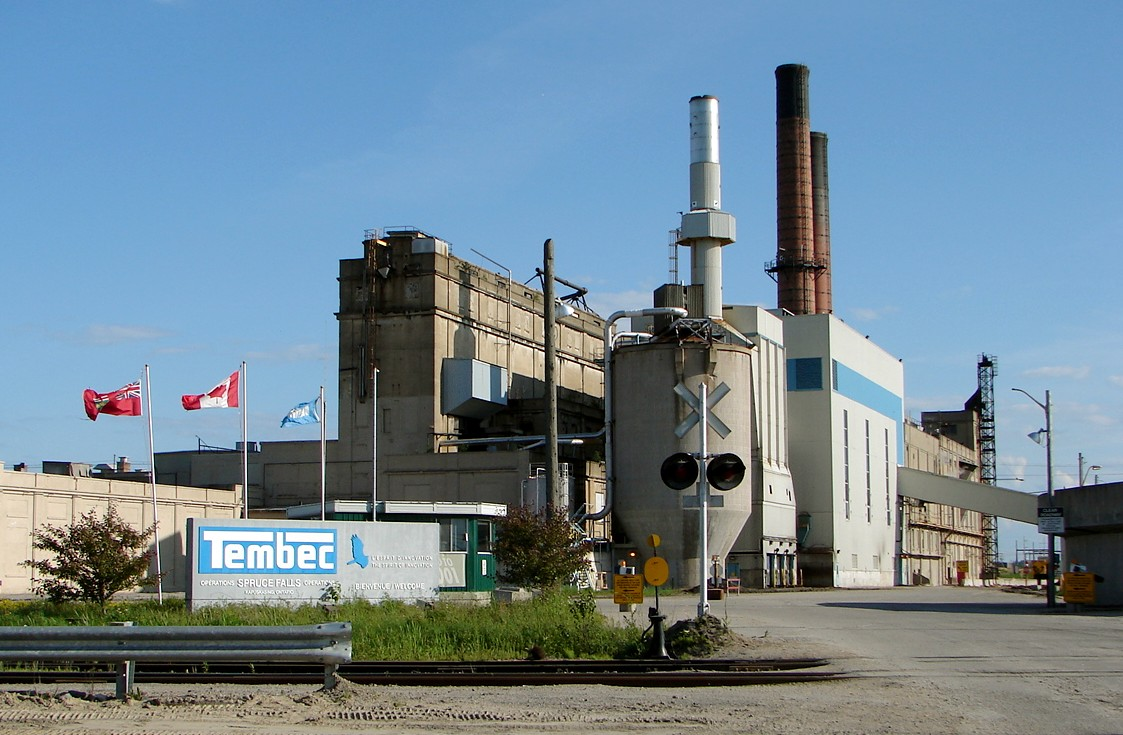
Tembec mill in Kapuskasing.

Tembec Industries Inc., known as Tembec, was a paper company in Canada, founded by Frank Dottori. In 2011, Tembec had approximately 3000 employees, with locations in Canada, United States, and France. Tembec's operating divisions included Forest Products, Pulp, Paper & Paperboard, and Chemicals.

== History ==
Tembec was founded in 1973 by Frank Dottori in the town of Témiscaming, Quebec, following efforts by former employees and Temiscaming residents to save their jobs and save their town's economy. They organized to create a company through an unprecedented relationship among entrepreneurs, unionized employees, the community and several levels of government. In 1973, the newly-founded company purchased the shuttered mill and Tembec was founded. A documentary covering the efforts of workers to form Tembec and reopen the mill, Témiskaming, Quebec, was created by Martin Duckworth and released by the National Film Board in 1975.

In May 2017, it was announced that Tembec had agreed to a takeover offer by Rayonier Advanced Materials for CAD $320 million. In July, Rayonier's offer was raised to CAD $475 million. The deal closed in November.

On 8 January 2020, the company was fined $250,000 for the 25 May 2018 death of a worker in Chapleau, to which it had pled guilty. The accident had occurred six days prior to when, according to court proceedings, "Rayonier acquired the mill from Tembec Industries Inc., which operated the mill under the name Ryam Lumber, on May 31, 2018."

== Operations ==
Tembec's Forest Products Group comprised 31 manufacturing operations producing softwood lumber, engineered wood products, and specialty wood products. The Pulp, Paper & Paperboard Group consisted of 9 pulp manufacturing plants, 5 paper manufacturing plants and 1 paperboard plant. The Chemicals group produced resins, ethanol lignin from the pulping discharge in five of its pulping plants.

== In popular culture ==
The town gained national attention and its efforts to save itself were chronicled in the documentary, A Town that Wouldn’t Die.
