= Domtar =

Diversified manufacturer of forest products

Domtar Corporation
- Type: Private
- Industry: Forest products industry
- Headquarters: Fort Mill, South Carolina; Montreal, Quebec
- Key people: Steve Henry (President, Paper and Packaging)
- Revenue: ▼US$7.154 billion (2024)
- Owner: Jackson Wijaya
- Number of employees: 14,000 (2025)
- Parent: Domtar
- Divisions: Paper and Packaging, Pulp and Tissue, Wood Products
- Website: www.domtar.com

Domtar Corporation is a North American manufacturer of pulp, paper, packaging, tissue and wood products, with operations across North America. The company employs approximately 14,000 people and operates more than 60 manufacturing and converting facilities in the United States and Canada. Domtar is owned by Jackson Wijaya.

== Corporate structure ==
Domtar operated as a publicly traded company on the Toronto and New York stock exchanges for several decades before being acquired by Paper Excellence Group in November 2021. Following the acquisition, the company operated as a subsidiary until 2024 when Paper Excellence consolidated its pulp, paper and forest businesses, including Paper Excellence Canada (formerly Catalyst Paper) and Resolute Forest Products, under the Domtar name.

As of 2024, the structure of Domtar reflects the consolidation formerly held by Domtar Corporation, Paper Excellence Canada Holdings Corporation, and Resolute Forest Products.

Domtar also owns and operates Ariva, a distribution network supplying paper, packaging and related products across North America, and EAM (Engineered Absorbent Materials).

== Post-Integration Corporate Structure ==
Following the acquisition by Paper Excellence in 2021, Domtar underwent strategic integration with other forest products businesses owned by Paper Excellence, including Resolute Forest Products and Paper Excellence Canada. The combined entity operates under the Domtar name with a unified corporate structure.

== Sustainability and Responsibility ==
Domtar has developed a global sustainability strategy aligned by three pillars: Environmental Stewardship, Our People and Communities, and Responsible Business. This strategy includes measurable goals related to emissions reduction, responsible fiber sourcing, water stewardship, biodiversity protection, and workplace safety. Sustainability reporting is published periodically to track progress toward the objectives.

In 2025, Domtar released a post-integration sustainability report documenting progress toward its 2030 sustainability goals, bringing together legacy business reporting frameworks under a unified strategy.

The company also participates in third-party environmental disclosure programs and publishes governance-related reporting on topics such as climate risk, forest certification standards, and supply chain due diligence. 100 percent of Domtar's fiber is sourced in accordance with third-party fiber sourcing standards.

== Products and Brands ==
Domtar's product portfolio includes:

- Uncoated freesheet and specialty papers, including Cougar®, Lynx®, Husky®, EarthChoice®, Xerox®, Clarion™ brands;
- Papergrade pulp and fluff pulp;
- Airlaid nonwovens;
- 100% recycled container board and packaging medium;
- Tissue products for retail and away-from-home channels, including Harmony® toilet tissue and paper towels, and Revo® tissue and towel dispensers;
- Lumber and remanufactured wood products;
- Distribution services via Ariva.

== History ==
=== Origins in Britain ===
Domtar's origins track back to 1848, when Henry Potter Burt founded Burt, Boulton Holdings Ltd. in England, a company that specialized in treating timber against with creosote to extend its durability. The company expanded internationally and established operations in Canada in the late 19th century.

In 1903, the Dominion Tar and Chemical Company, Limited was formed in Canada, with its first plant in Sydney, Nova Scotia. The company grew rapidly by supplying treated wood and processing coal tar products, securing major industrial contracts and expanding across the country.

=== Incorporation in Canada ===
In 1929, Dominion Tar and Chemical Company Ltd. was incorporated as a Canadian entity and listed on the Montreal and Toronto stock exchanges. Despite the economic challenges of the Great Depression, the company expanded its operations and diversified into industrial materials, including salt production under the Sifto brand.

During the 1950s, Dominion Tar experienced significant growth through acquisitions and investments, including a strategic move into the pulp and paper industry with the acquisition of Howard Smith Paper Mills. Over time, the company began focusing more heavily on paper manufacturing.

=== Creation of Domtar ===
In 1961, Dominion Tar merged with several companies, including Howard Smith Paper, St. Lawrence Corporation Limited, and Hinde & Dauch Limited. In 1965, the company was renamed Domtar Ltd. (later changed to Domtar Inc.) and reorganized into multiple operating divisions.

During the following years, Domtar consolidated its pulp and paper operations and gradually shifted its strategic focus toward becoming a paper manufacturing company.

=== Acquisitions and rationalizations ===
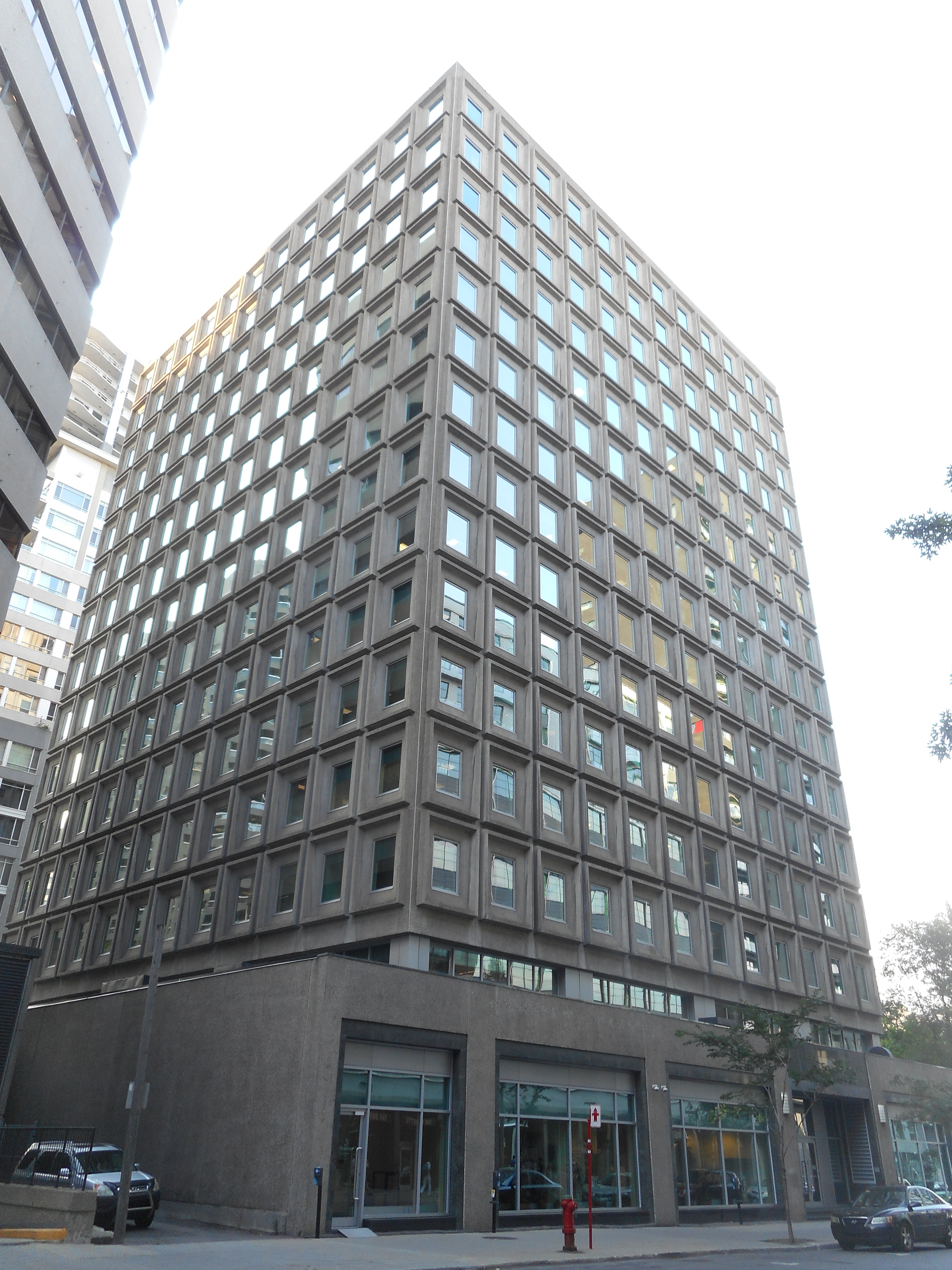
Domtar House, the company's headquarters in Montreal at 395 boulevard de Maisonneuve, opened in November 1968. It was designed by Reuben Fisher for Maxwell Cummings & Sons, and called the President Kennedy Building originally.

Throughout the 1970s and 1980s, Domtar expanded its operations through acquisitions and investments in paper manufacturing, distribution, and forestry activities. At the same time, the company divested several non-core businesses, including consumer products and industrial materials, to focus on paper and packaging.

In 1997, Domtar formed a joint venture with Cascades Inc. called Norampac, a major North American container board and packaging producer. The company continued do grow through acquisitions, including E. B. Eddy Company in 1998 and Ris Paper Company Inc. in 2000.

In 2001, Domtar acquired several paper mills from Georgia-Pacific Corporation, significantly expanding its presence in the North American paper market and becoming one of the largest producers of uncoated freesheet paper in the region.

=== Merger with Weyerhaeuser ===
Logo used until 2024.

In 2007, Domtar merge with the fine paper business of Weyerhaeuser, creating one of the largest uncoated frees paper manufacturers in North America..

In 2011, Domtar expanded into personal care products through acquisition of Attends Healthcare, a manufacturer of incontinence products. In 2013, the company acquired Xerox's paper businesses in the United States and Canada, becoming the exclusive distributor of Xerox-branded paper products in those markets.

=== Acquisition by Paper Excellence ===
On May 11, 2021, Paper Excellence announced the acquisition of Domtar Corporation for US$2.8-billion. The transaction marked a significant shift in ownership, transitioning the company from a publicly traded entity to a privately held subsidiary.

Following the acquisition, Domtar was integrated with other forest products businesses owned by Paper Excellence, including Resolute Forest Products, forming a larger, vertically integrated forest products company operating across North America.

== Governance and Reporting ==
Domtar maintains corporate governance and sustainability reporting aligned with regulatory frameworks and voluntary disclosure standards. The company publishes governance and sustainability disclosures on its corporate website.

In 2026, Domtar received updated CDP scores reflecting their first disclosure as an integrated company. The company earned an A− score in Forests, a B in Climate Change, a B in Water Security, and an A in Commodities (Timber).

=== Awards and Recognition ===
In 2025, Domtar's Kingsport, Tennessee mill received the Fred Schmitt Award for Outstanding Corporate Leadership from the National Recycling Coalition in recognition of its leadership in recycling and sustainable manufacturing practices.

Domtar was also recognized by Crayola with the 2025 CARE Award for sustainability collaboration, acknowledging its support in providing environmental performance data and advancing sustainability initiatives within the supply chain.

=== Community and Environmental Partnerships ===
Domtar has reported engagement in community-based environmental and educational initiatives across its operation regions in Canada and the United States. The company has described partnerships supporting conservation programs, employee volunteerism, and education outreach efforts in local communities near its manufacturing facilities.

In addition, Domtar has participated in industry and stakeholder advisory initiatives focused on sustainable forestry practices and responsible land management.

== Environmental issues ==
=== Nova Scotia ===
The company was originally known as the Dominion Tar and Chemical Company, Limited. Its first plant was located in Cape Breton, Nova Scotia.

Dominion Tar and Chemical Company Ltd (Domtar) operated a coal tar refining plant and a coal tar storage facility in Sydney from 1903 to 1962. This facility was situated directly adjacent to and north of the coke oven operations. It diverted coal tar from the coke ovens, refined it, moved it through pipes, and stored it in tanks for shipping elsewhere. Domtar ceased operations in Sydney in 1962 abandoning its storage tanks, waste disposal lagoons, pipes, buildings and equipment. Domtar conducted little or no clean up of the site. A large tank, referred to as the "Domtar tank", remained in place adjacent to the coke ovens site into the 2000s, measuring 28 m (92 ft.) in diameter and 6 m (20 ft.) high. It contained materials abandoned by Domtar and other materials added in the years since the facility's abandonment.

This site, which is located adjacent to the former Sydney Steel plant, is included in a $400 million government sponsored cleanup of what is referred to as the Sydney Tar Ponds.

In 2008 Domtar partnered with WWF as a part of an ongoing effort to help them source their materials responsibly. They are also a long-time member of the Two Sides initiative.

=== Cornwall ===
Domtar operated a paper mill in Cornwall, Ontario until 2006. The original mill was built by the Toronto Manufacturing Company in 1881 and purchased by Howard Smith Paper Mills in 1919.

In the early 1970s, Domtar persuaded the City of Cornwall to permit the dumping of its paper mill waste (sludge, bark and lime dregs) behind a shopping mall in the middle of the city. Part of the dump was sodded over while dumping continued, and Domtar funded a "bunny" ski hill there, known as "Big Ben".

By the late 1980s, Domtar was pumping "an average of 102 million litres of waste water into the St. Lawrence River every day". In May 1988, Greenpeace hung a banner from the company's smokestacks demanding: 'Zero discharge now', referring to discharges of heavy metals, PCBs, phenols, and dioxins. Domtar was "fighting efforts to make it clean up" and it was listed as one of the worst polluters in Ontario in 1989.

By the mid-1990s this Domtar landfill was rapidly filling up with sludge, bark, and lime dregs from the Cornwall kraft and fine paper mill. The problem was exacerbated when new waste water regulations required the Cornwall mill to also remove lignin and starch—formerly discharged into the St. Lawrence River—from its waste water. In response, Domtar began selling dewatered mill waste to Cornwall and area residents labeled as "Soil Conditioner".

For some five years—until high levels of fecal coliforms and fecal streptococcus were discovered in the waste—this "Soil Conditioner" was sold for home garden use and was used by local farmers as fertilizer. Domtar at first claimed that their process could not have contributed e-coli and fecal coli from human feces. The company later revealed to the Ontario Ministry of the Environment (MOE) that some toilets and urinals at the mill connected with the mill's waste water treatment process, rather than with the city's sanitary sewers. Moreover, a stormwater system also emptied into the sludge generating system.

The paper mill site (now a brownfield) was sold to Paris Holdings of Cornwall in 2006 with undisclosed terms and covenants relating to liability and clean up of soil and water affected, for over 120 years, by mill and human waste. Domtar still maintains control of the adjacent dump which is the source of a leachate plume polluting ground water between it and the St. Lawrence River (with the City of Cornwall Water Purification Plant in between). The dump which is officially named, the "Big Ben Landfill And Recreation Area", currently receives demolition waste and asbestos from the decommissioned paper mill.

In 2007, Domtar Corporation made a request to the MOE to additionally allow the dumping of soil at "Big Ben", contaminated with coal tar and bitumen waste, from another Dominion Tar and Chemical Co. Limited site in Cornwall. This manufacturing facility at 7th St. W. and Cumberland Street in Cornwall produced "bituminous fibre" pipe, from 1929 to 1976 known variously as; Cornwall "Standard" Fibre Conduit (1929–38), Cornwall Nocrete Conduit (1938–44), and finally No-co-rode Co. Ltd. – Fibre Conduit Division (1944–76).

In September 2008, over public opposition and in spite of MOE reports indicating off-site leachate impact from the dump and the likelihood of runoff to the St. Lawrence River, the MOE permitted dumping at the "Big Ben" site of contaminated soils from Domtar's former No-co-rode Ltd. site.

Domtar has not remediated its former lands in Cornwall including; its paper mill site, its sludge and bark dump, and its coal tar pipe lands.

=== Western Canada ===
Domtar also operated a wood treatment facility in Cochrane, Alberta, treating railroad ties. This ceased operation about 1982, leaving significantly contaminated land. The latest of several clean-up operations is attempting to prevent the underground migration of the main contaminant plume. Building of non-residential structures is now in progress on part of the land.

The company once operated a wood treatment facility in the Transcona section of Winnipeg, Manitoba. The facility has been dismantled, and a residential development was created adjacent to the site in the early 1980s. The site itself remained largely vacant. In the late 1990s, years of debate and scientific study culminated with the re-detoxification. Many properties adjacent to the site were excavated to remove contaminated earth. Dozens of homes had their backyards completely dug up, and a handful also had parts of their homes removed and rebuilt—all at the company's expense. The site itself, was converted to a wildlife sanctuary with a nature path.

Domtar operated a wood treatment plant in northeast Edmonton from 1924 to 1987. The 37-hectare property in question served as a Domtar Inc. wood-treatment operation from 1924 to 1987. Cherokee bought the land in 2010 to build a residential subdivision. Between 1924 and 1987, Domtar used this area to treat wood with creosote and other chemicals. Until 1972, the company simply dumped its untreated waste into a drainage ditch. When the plant went out of business, the soil and groundwater were left contaminated. In 1991, the Edmonton Board of Health issued warning letters, telling Hermitage neighbours to keep their children away from that area.

But Domtar and a Toronto-based brownfield specialist, Cherokee, carried out extensive remediation of the site. Eventually, Cherokee bought the whole 37-hectare parcel for $1.8 million. Parts of the property were more polluted than others.

=== Other locations ===
Other Domtar sites contaminated by creosote and coal tar by products include; "Sunalta" in Calgary, Alberta; Truro, Nova Scotia; Newcastle, New Brunswick; and New Westminster, British Columbia. Domtar also operated a tie treating plant in Trenton, Ontario for many years.

Domtar operated a paper mill in Toronto from 1961 to late 1980s and is now site of Crothers Woods.

As of 2019, amongst the COVID-19 outbreak, Domtar announced a temporary reduction at its paper-making capacity at its Kingsport Mill, Tennessee due to decreased demand during the pandemic. The Kingsport Mill was then converted to the company's first 100 percent recycled containerboard manufacturing facility, which opened in May 2023. Domtar is the second-largest recycler in the state of Tennessee.

Permanent paper machine closures were completed at the Ashdown, Arkansas pulp and paper mill, and the Port Huron, Michigan paper mill.

== Leadership ==
This list includes only leaders of Domtar and its predecessor companies. It does not include leaders from Resolute Forest Products of Paper Excellence Canada.

=== President ===
1. Lionel Oscar Percy Walsh, 1929–1946
2. Arthur Osborne Ponder, 1946–1950
3. Arthur Herbert Martin, 1950–1954
4. Edward Plunket Taylor, 1954–1957
5. Wilfred Newman Hall, 1957–1966
6. Thomas Norbert Beaupré, 1966–1974
7. Alexander Daniel Hamilton, 1974–1981
8. James Hamilton Smith, 1981–1990
9. Pierre Desjardins, 1990–1994
10. Stephen C. Larson, 1994–1996
11. Raymond Royer, 1996–2008
12. John David Williams, 2009–2023

=== Chairman of the Board ===
1. Lionel Oscar Percy Walsh, 1946–1951
2. Edward Plunket Taylor, 1951–1966
3. Thomas Norbert Beaupré, 1966–1974
4. Maxwell Charles Gordon Meighen, 1974–1978
5. Alex Ethelred Barron, 1978–1981
6. Alexander Daniel Hamilton, 1981–1982
7. Yves Pratte, 1982–1988
8. James Hamilton Smith, 1989–1990
9. Jean Campeau, 1990–1992
10. Robert Després, 1992–1993
11. Paul Gobeil, 1993–1994
12. Gilles Blondeau, 1994–1996
13. Jacques Girard, 1996–2004
14. Brian Michael Levitt, 2004–2007
15. Harold Hugh MacKay, 2007– 2014
16. Robert Joseph Steacy, 2014–2017
17. Robert Ernest Apple Jr., 2017–2021
18. John David Williams, 2021–2025

In 2022, Domtar become a privately owned entity and dissolved its Board of Directors.

=== Owner ===
- Jackson Wijaya, 2021-present

=== Non-executive Chair ===
1. John D. Wiliams, 2023-2025
2. Alf Barrios, 2025-present

=== Vice chair ===
- Hoany (Wawa) Muljadi, 2025-present

=== Advisory Board ===
- Alf Barrios, 2026-present
- Wawa Muljadi, 2026-present
- Lito Camacho, 2026-present
- Pierre Fitzgibbon, 2026-present
- Lin Piao Goh, 2026-present

=== Executive Committee ===
- Steve Henry, CEO, Paper and Packaging and President, United States
- Luc Theriault, CEO, Pulp and Wood Products and President, Canada
- Claudio Cotrim, Chief Corporate Officer
- Wawa Muljadi, Interim CEO, Tissue
- Joe Ragan, Chief Financial Officer
- Sebastien Richard, Interim Chief Human Resources Officer

== See also ==
- List of paper mills
- Pulp and paper industry in Canada
