= Bathurst Power and Paper Company =

Canadian pulp and paper company (1928–1988)

Coordinates: 47.6128°N 65.6431°W

- Founded: 3 February 1928
- Defunct: 30 December 1988
- Fate: Dissolved after the sale of Consolidated-Bathurst to the Stone Container Corporation
- Headquarters: Montreal, Quebec
- Parent: Consolidated-Bathurst (1967–1988)

Bathurst Power and Paper Company Limited, and from 1965 onwards Bathurst Paper Limited, was a combined logging, lumber mill and wood-pulp paper company that supplied its own electric power from Nepisiguit Grand Falls. Its operations were centred at Bathurst, New Brunswick. In 1967, the Consolidated Paper Corporation acquired Bathurst outright, and that year Consolidated changed its name to Consolidated-Bathurst Limited, while Bathurst Paper became a subsidiary. In 1988, Consolidated-Bathurst was acquired by the Stone Container Corporation, and that year, Bathurst was disestablished. In 1989, Consolidated-Bathurst merged with Stone to form Stone-Consolidated Inc.

After changing hands several times over the course of a century, Smurfit-Stone closed the mill located in East Bathurst in 2006, and sold the site to a redevelopment firm. The redeveloper, which was already defunct by January 2016, was fined $150,000 in July 2016 under the New Brunswick Clean Environment Act.

== History ==
After the death of Senator Kennedy Francis Burns twinned with the disestablishment of Novelli & Company in March 1894, the St. Lawrence Lumber Company, which owned most of the mills of Bathurst and was presided by Burns, foundered. The Courrier des Provinces Maritimes reported 19 September 1895 that the Sumner Company from Moncton had purchased the SLLC from the receivers but two weeks later the same newspaper reported that the English shareholders had rejected the offer of $29,000, in favour of Adams & Co. of New York. Burns' brother-in-law Samuel Adams had combined with his own brother, Thomas D., Patrick J. Burns, Theobald M. Burns and John Flanigan to re-form Adams, Burns and Company (ABC). By November 1895 the assets in the county had been settled, and work advanced as planned over the winter of 1895.

The Courrier reported in April 1897 that the ABC was in the sawmill to install electric lighting so as to operate on a 24-hour day. By 1898, the ABC possessed or licensed from the Crown 250 square miles (64,750ha) of forest.

In 1899, the ABC proposed to enter the wood pulp business, and received from the County Council a 20-year exemption from the taxes it controlled, however, the proposal did not advance at this time.

On 25 October 1900, the Courrier reported that the mill at Burnsville, New Brunswick (which by K.F. Burns in 1890 had been amalgamated with the mill in Bathurst) had been sold to Georges I. Theriault and Co.

In 1907 the newly incorporated Bathurst Lumber Company purchased the interests of the Sumner Company.

On 6 October 1909, the ABC divested itself of the East Bathurst Mill. The new owners, who were from New York state, formed the Nepisiguit Lumber Company (NLC). Also in 1909, the NLC purchased the shingle mill (near the mouth of Carter's Brook on the Bathurst harbour) of the O.F. Stacy Company, which had been in operation since 1885. The NLC had control of 650 square miles of Crown timber; with this plant the NLC proposed to produce wood pulp but in two years' time, the NLC would enter receivership and the assets reverted to the ABC.

The next year, 1912, the ABC sold the whole to the Bathurst Lumber Company.

In 1914, due to the diminishing supply of large trees on the North Shore, a kraft pulp mill and a sulphite pulp mill were built on the west bank of the Nepisiguit, close to town in the old Cunard farm property. The new mills each produced daily about 50 tons.

Angus L. McLean joined the firm in 1915, and brought with him the rights for timber on the Gaspé, Quebec side of Chaleur Bay. He would eventually become the General Manager and public persona of the firm; about 1925 he erected a "palatial home", that in 1938 was purchased by the new See of Bathurst.

In 1919, the Bathurst Lumber Company bought out the Bathurst Electric and Water Power Company, which had been formed in 1904 by Act of Assembly to exploit the Tetagouche River, and in 1912 had installed a hydroelectric plant at Tetagouche Falls, about eight miles from Bathurst.

In 1920, the firm purchased the Cascapedia Manufacturing and Trading Company.

In 1921, the amalgamated company started to build the hydroelectric plant at Nepisiguit Grand Falls. In the same year, under a Dominion charter, the Bathurst firm was renamed the Bathurst Company Limited. The firm soon began construction of a groundwood mill and the installation of a fourdrinier machine which in 1923 produced New Brunswick's first newsprint.

The hydroelectric power dam at Nepisiguit Grand Falls was completed in 1926 at a cost to the private owners of over $3 million. The falls drop over 100 feet through a canyon of solid granite. The 400-man project of dam construction lasted a year and a half and ended in 1921.

About the end of 1927, control of the firm passed to the Newsprint Bond and Share Corporation and in 1928 the Bathurst Power and Paper Company was formed by them. The local newspaper reported that $20 million had changed hands. Sir James Dunn filed suit with Angus McLean over stock options in the firm that he claimed he had been denied.

The Bathurst Lumber Company No. 2 Mill (in East Bathurst) was decommissioned and dismantled in January 1928, although this NLC-vintage mill had not been in operation for a number of years prior to this date.

Majority control of the company was obtained in 1936 by Arthur J. Nesbitt and his partner Peter A. T. Thomson in Nesbitt, Thomson and Company through their holding company, Power Corporation of Canada. Their first project was the construction of a pulp drying machine for the manufacture of boxboard.

In 1939, the firm purchased the John Fenderson Company, which held the Jacquet River timber concessions from the Crown, and the Jacquet River Boom Company.

The firm invented Bathurst Corrugating Medium (BCM) in 1950. This product is manufactured from hardwoods by means of a continuous semi-chemical process, and allowed the firm to utilize a greater fraction of the timber; in other words, less waste was generated by its activities.

In the early 1950s, control of the hydroelectric plant at Grand Falls was ceded by the BPPC to a provincial Crown corporation which was named at the time the New Brunswick Electric Power Commission.

On 1 June 1959 a second boxboard was commissioned.

In the early 1960s, Power Corporation bought the Consolidated Paper Company. When Paul Desmarais acquired control of Power Corporation in 1968, the two companies were merged to become Consolidated-Bathurst Inc. By far the largest private employer in the city for many years, Consolidated-Bathurst in 1977 employed 586 people. In 1989, the company was sold to Stone Container Corporation of Chicago, Illinois who renamed it Stone Consolidated Inc.

Stone shuttered it in 2005 because of global overcapacity in the pulp and paper business. The Bathurst plant had at the time capacity for 243,000 tons per annum of corrugated medium. The closure was brought on by the post-millennial trend towards overseas manufacture. The chairman, president and CEO of Smurfit-Stone, Patrick J. Moore, stated:

We are in a mature industry that [recently] has struggled to achieve adequate returns. We have been unable to pass along inflationary costs, such as energy and fiber, to our customers. In addition, the manufacturing exodus overseas has had a strong impact on containerboard demand throughout North America.

== Notes ==
=== Bibliography ===
- MacMillan, Gail (1978). An Outline of the History of Bathurst. Sackville, NB: The Tribune Press.
- McCarthy, Aloysius James (1999). Historic Bathurst on the Bay of Chaleur. Halifax, NS: Nimbus Publishing. ISBN 9781551093031.
- O'Connell, Rod. "Bathurst Lumber Company Sawmill No. 2". One Hundred Years of the Pulp and Paper Industry in Bathurst. Nepisiguit Centennial Museum & Cultural Centre.
