= Bowater =

Former pulp and paper company

Bowater Inc.
- Type: Public
- Industry: Pulp and paper, wood products
- Founded: 1984
- Founder: William Vansittart Bowater
- Defunct: 2007
- Successor: Resolute Forest Products
- Headquarters: Greenville, South Carolina, United States
- Area served: North America
- Products: Newsprint, uncoated groundwood, wood products, recycling services, lumber

Bowater Inc. was a paper and pulp business headquartered in Greenville, South Carolina. It merged with Abitibi-Consolidated in 2007, and the combined company went on to become Resolute Forest Products.

== History ==
The North American assets of Bowater plc were built up in the 1970s, becoming known as Bowater Inc., headquartered in Greenville, South Carolina. The company demerged from Bowater plc in 1984.

The company acquired additional Canadian interests in the late 1990s, when it bought Avenor (formerly Canadian Pacific Forest Products). By the mid-2000s, Bowater Inc had 10,000 employees across 12 pulp and paper mills in the United States, Canada and South Korea, along with 13 North American sawmills. On 29 January 2007, Bowater Inc and Abitibi-Consolidated announced they would be merging to create AbitibiBowater. The merger created the third largest pulp and paper company in North America, and the eighth largest in the world. On 1 July 2012, the company name changed to Resolute Forest Products.
