= List of people from Bathurst, New Brunswick =

This is a list of notable people from Bathurst, New Brunswick. Although not everyone in this list was born in Bathurst, they all live or have lived in Bathurst and have had significant connections to the community.

This article does not include the List of people from Gloucester County, New Brunswick as they have their own section.

== Mayors of Bathurst ==
This list of mayors of Bathurst may be found in MacMillan (reference below, to 1983) or at the City Hall where the mayoral photographic portrait array is to the left of chambers.

Name	Yr in	Mo in	Yr out	Mo out
P.J. Burns	1912	October	1915	April
J.N. Michaud, MD	1915	April	1917	April
W.H. Coffyn	1917	April	1919	April
T.M. Burns	1919	April	1921	April
J.B. Hachey	1921	April	1923	April
W.J. Kent	1923	April	1925	April
J.L. Ryan, QC	1925	April	1927	April
A. Landry	1927	April	1929	April
G. Gilbert, KC	1929	April	1931	April
J.E. Connolly	1931	April	1933	April
C.I. Veniot, MD	1933	April	1935	April
R.G. Duncan, MD	1935	April	1937	April
J.E. Connolly	1937	April	1939	April
M.H. Poirier	1939	April	1941	April
E.H. Chalmers	1941	April	1943	April
J.E. Connolly	1943	April	1945	April
A.M. Robichaud, QC	1945	April	1947	April
G.A. MacDonald	1947	April	1949	April
E.G. Byrne, KC	1949	April	1951	April
S.L. Frenette, MD	1951	April	1953	February
M. Smith	1953	February	1955	February
L.G. Riordon	1955	February	1957	February
R.J. Cormier	1957	February	1959	February
G.A. MacDonald	1959	February	1961	February
V.J. Whelton	1961	February	1963	February
G. Vantassel	1963	?	1965	?
D. Young	1965		1967	
J.A. Picot	1967		1969	
H. Ferguson	1969		1971	
W.B. Orser, MD	1971		1974	
J.A. Duffy	1974		1980	
R. Clinch	1980		1983	
P. McLaughlin	1983		?	

== Federal Parliament representation ==
=== Members of Parliament for Gloucester County ===
- Timothy Warren Anglin 1867–1882
  - Speaker of the House March 26, 1874 – February 12, 1879
- Kennedy Francis Burns 1882–1893

=== Senators from the Bathurst subdivision ===
- John Ferguson 1867–1888
- Kennedy Francis Burns 1893–1895

== Other people from Bathurst ==
Name	Known for	Birth	Death	Other
David Branch	ice hockey	1948	2026	commissioner of the Canadian Hockey League and Ontario Hockey League
Charlie Chamberlain	entertainer	1911	1972	a featured entertainer on Don Messer's Jubilee on CBC Television, 1957–1969
Jodi Cooke	journalist	1979		NTV Sunday Evening News Hour anchor
Sean Couturier	ice hockey	1992		NHL hockey player currently with the Philadelphia Flyers
Joe De Grasse	film director	1873	1940	pioneer Hollywood film director
Sam De Grasse	actor	1875	1953	known primarily for playing crafty and villainous film roles
Lyse Doucet	journalist	1958		BBC journalist
James Dunn	industrialist	1874	1956	banker, art collector, industrialist, philanthropist
Robert Frigault	author	1971		author, publisher, activist
Herman James Good	soldier	1887	1969	Bathurst-born recipient of the Victoria Cross for actions during the Battle of Amiens in the First World War
Bill Hatanaka	Canadian football	1954		chair of the Ontario Health agency's board of directors
W.J. Kent	businessman	1860	1943	founding alderman in Bathurst's first town council, mayor of Bathurst for two terms
Felix Roland "Rollie" Rossignol	ice hockey	1921	1981	former NHL forward and local businessman
Scott Smith	ice hockey	1966		president of Hockey Canada
Natasha St-Pier	singer	1981		francophone chart-topping singer

== See also ==
- List of people from New Brunswick
- Boys in Red Tragedy
