= Connolly's quarry =

Disused Canadian granite quarry in New Brunswick

Connolly's quarry, now closed, was located five miles south of Bathurst, New Brunswick, in Canada. The quarry was the source of the distinctive pink-grey granite employed in various prominent government and institutional buildings of the late Victorian, Edwardian and Georgian eras throughout Gloucester County. Bridge piers for much of the Intercolonial Railway were constructed with the quarry's stone.

== History ==
Quarrying at the site was begun by Hannah (née Hussey) Connolly's father William Hussey, some time around 1870. The quarry was later deeded to her, likely as a dowry. She and her husband, who worked in the quarry himself, passed it down through the family tree to her sons, Daniel P and Joseph E, who took it over as a business partnership early in the 20th century.

Stone from this quarry was used to construct bridges for the Moncton-to-Campbellton section on the Intercolonial Railway.

The stone first came to public prominence in 1886 through the agency of Fathers James Rogers and Thomas F. Barry, who specified its use in the Roman Catholic Sacred Heart church, now cathedral. Many people did volunteer work during the construction of the church, and this secured them a pew seat in the church for many years.

In the early years of the 20th century, the Connolly brothers specialised in wharf and bridge pier work; their crews were seen to work along the entire St Lawrence coast of New Brunswick. The RCAF bases at Chatham, New Brunswick and Mont Joli, Quebec, were built by them during World War II. After 1950 the Connolly brothers also exploited Antinouri Lake, which has a similar pink granite.

Joseph eventually would serve three two-year terms as mayor of Bathurst, and in 1961 was awarded the title Freeman of the City.

The partnership between Joseph and Daniel Connolly was replaced in 1955 with Connolly Construction Limited, when the next generation grew into the quarry business. In the William C Connolly era, the corporation employed as many as 200 local men – all of whom had been trained in house – at peak construction times.

In the last half of the 20th century, ownership turned to marketing the stone for retail purposes under the name "Bathurst-Gray".

== Constructions ==
- 1886 Sacred Heart church, since 1938 cathedral at Bathurst
- 1900 Glos County Courthouse at Bathurst
- 1924 Sacred Heart School on St Andrew, now NB Public Health
- 1926 Bathurst High School
- 1976 Angus L. Macdonald Bridge which links the Halifax Peninsula to Dartmouth (piers)
