= Theobald M. Burns =

Canadian politician

Theobald Matthew Burns (June 1862 – February 21, 1926) was a lumber merchant and political figure in New Brunswick, Canada. He represented Gloucester County in the Legislative Assembly of New Brunswick from 1899 to 1908 as a Conservative member.

He was born of Irish parents and educated in Chatham, New Brunswick. Burns ran unsuccessfully in the federal Gloucester riding in 1908 and 1911, losing to Onésiphore Turgeon each time. In 1912, he married Ethel White.

Burns was in 1895 a principal of the re-formed Adams, Burns and Company, a successor upon bankruptcy of the St. Lawrence Lumber Company.

Over the period from April 1919 to April 1921 he was Mayor of Bathurst, New Brunswick.
