= Samuel Napier =

Samuel Napier may refer to:

- Samuel Napier (Canadian politician), member of the Legislative Assembly of New Brunswick
- Samuel Napier (Northern Irish politician)
- Sam Napier (footballer), Irish footballer
