= Hugh Munro (disambiguation) =

Sir Hugh Munro, 4th Baronet (1856–1919) was a mountaineer who listed Scotland's mountains over 3,000 feet.

Hugh Munro may also refer to:

- Hugh Munro, 9th Baron of Foulis (died 1425), Scottish soldier
- Hugh Andrew Johnstone Munro of Novar (1797–1864), art collector and patron of J.M.W. Turner
- Hugh Andrew Johnstone Munro (1819–1885), British classical scholar
- Hugh Munro (trainer) (1858–1925), Australian racehorse trainer
- Hugh Munro (Canadian politician) (1854–1939)
- Hugh Munro (New Brunswick settler) (1764–1846)
- Sir Hugh Munro, 8th Baronet (1763–1848)
- Hugh Munro-Lucas-Tooth (1903–1985), British Conservative politician

== See also ==
- Clan Munro, for less notable persons named Hugh Munro
