= List of people from Gloucester County, New Brunswick =

This is a list of notable people from Gloucester County, New Brunswick. Although not everyone in this list was born in Gloucester County, they all live or have lived in Gloucester County and have had significant connections to the communities.

This article does not include people from Bathurst as they have their own wiki page.

== Members of the House of Assembly of New Brunswick ==
The House of Assembly of New Brunswick was, between 1784 and 1968, founded on a representative democracy based on a county system. This list, from MacMillan (reference below), is of Members elected in Gloucester County, New Brunswick, which was originated in 1827 on the partition of Northumberland County, New Brunswick. Cabinet members seem to be indicated in MacMillan's list by the prenominal Honourable.

Surname	Given name	Year in	Year out	Birth	Death
Alexandre	Joshua	1842	1846		
Blanchard (Esq.)	T.	1870	1874 (?)		
Burns	Kennedy Francis	1874	1878		
Boudreau	J. Omer	1963			
Burns	Theobald Matthew	1899	1908		
Byrne (Hon.)	James Paul	1908	1912		
Coffyn, MD	Wesley Hervert (sic)	1931	1935		
Connolly	Joseph Edward	1940	1960		
Doucet (Hon.)	Joseph Andre	1923	1956		
End	William	1830	1850		
End	William	1854	1861		
Ferguson	Adjutor Arthur	1967			
Fournier (Hon.)	Joseph Michel	1945	1963		
Gordon, MD	Robert	1850	1854		
Hachey	Joseph Bennett	1912	1917		
Hachey	Gerard	1966			
Jean (Hon.)	Bernard Alfred	1960			
Lordon	John Paul	1925	1930		
Leger	Seraphin R.	1908	1912		
Losier	William Arthur	1935	1944		
McManus	Francis James	1878	1886		
MacNaughton	Patrick	1864 (sic)	1856		
MacNaughton	Patrick	1856	1857		
Meahan	John	1861	1870		
Munro	Hugh	1827	1830		
Napier	Samuel Hawkins	1870	1874		
Paulin	Prospere Elise	1895	1899		
Poirier	Joseph	1890	1892		
Poirier	Joseph	1898	1908		
Rand (Hon.)	Ivan Cleveland	1925	1925		
Reade	Joseph	1890	1892		
Richard (Hon.)	Clovis Thomas	1926	1945		
Richard (Hon.)	Rheal Ernest	1948			
Robichaud	John George	1917	1923		
Robichaud	Martin Jean	1912	1917		
Ryan (Hon.)	Patrick George	1875	1892		
Savoie	Joseph Vincent Claude	1956	1967		

== Other people from Gloucester County ==
Full Name	Community	Famous for	Birth	Death	Other
Renée Blanchar	Caraquet	Filmmaker	1964		
Luc Bourdon	Shippagan	Athlete	1987	2008	NHL player
Jean-François Breau	Tracadie	Musician	1978		Acadian singer
Edith Butler	Hautes-Terres	Musician	1942		Acadian singer
Herménégilde Chiasson	Saint-Simon	Poet	1946		29th Lieutenant Governor of New Brunswick
Tom Culligan	Belledune	Businessman	1945		co-founder of the Second Cup franchise company
Mathieu Duguay	Lamèque	Musician	1937		Founder and longtime artistic director of the Lamèque International Baroque Music Festival
Jason Godin	Maisonnette	Politics	1993		Mayor of Maisonnette since 2012 and NDP candidate for the riding of Acadie-Bathurst in 2015 federal election
Wilfred LeBouthillier	Tracadie	Musician	1978		Acadian singer and 2003 winner of Star Academie (a Quebec reality show for aspiring singers)
Denis Losier	Tracadie	Politician	1952		New Brunswick Liberal MLA (Tracadie) and Minister from 1988 to 1994
Rose-Marie Losier-Cool	Tracadie	Politician	1937		Senator 1995–2012
Serge Rousselle	Tracadie	Politics	19xx		New Brunswick Attorney General; Minister of Education and Early Childhood Development; Liberal MLA for the riding of Tracadie-Sheila
Doug Young	Tracadie	Politician	1940		New Brunswick MLA from 1978–1983, New Brunswick Minister of Fisheries in 1987, Liberal MP and Minister from 1993–1997
Robert Young	Caraquet	Politician	1834	1904	great-uncle of Doug Young

== See also ==
- List of people from New Brunswick
