= Edward Gerald Byrne =

Canadian lawyer and politician (1912–2003)

Edward Gerald Byrne OC (23 July 1912 – 14 May 2003) was a New Brunswick lawyer and politician, who was made King's Counsel and Member of the Order of Canada.

== Biography ==
Byrne was born to medical doctor Thomas Ives and Rita Ross in Chatham, New Brunswick on 23 July 1912.

Already a practicing lawyer, Byrne rose to the rank of Flight Commander in the RCAF during his two years' service in the Second World War. Later, on 27 June 1946, he married another veteran, Ruth Ann Corr. For one year prior to his election in 1949 as Mayor of Bathurst, Byrne was President of his local chapter of the Rotary Club.

Byrne appeared in many, if not most, of the important trials that related to business in Gloucester County during his 34-year career there.

Byrne chaired the New Brunswick Royal Commission on Finance and Municipal Taxation whose 1,000-page report, tabled in November 1963, was instrumental in the development of the Université de Moncton, and led to the adoption of the province's Equal Opportunity Programme, which revolutionised the financial and social policies of the province:

It advocated tax reform, the end of county governments, central responsibility for education, health, hospitals, social welfare and justice, and the trimming of school districts from 422 to 60. Nothing, however, argued the case more poignantly than word from Gloucester County that, after mailing teachers salary cheques totaling $135,000, officials were out of money.

When the Byrne Commission was established in 1962, three New Brunswick counties were on the brink of bankruptcy. The report provided for equalization grants to municipalities that could not afford to provide a standard level of service.

Premier Bernard Lord said in his condolences that:

Byrne will go down in history as one of the architects of modern New Brunswick.

An earlier writer considered the Report and Programme as hauling

New Brunswick society kicking and screaming into the twentieth century.

Byrne was at one point or another appointed a director of the Bank of Canada, Consolidated Bathurst Pulp and Paper Ltd., Gotaas Larsen Shipping, Brunswick Mines and Noranda, among others.

Byrne was recognized by the Ecole de Sacre Coeur, Bathurst, St. Thomas University, St. Francis Xavier University, University of New Brunswick and Dalhousie University, which all awarded him Doctor Honoris Causa.

Byrne passed away in Halifax, Nova Scotia on 14 May 2003 at 90 years of age. A Roman Catholic, he was predeceased by his wife of 55 years, Ruth Ann Corr, and survived by his twins, Joseph Ross and Anne.

== Elimination of tax concessions in New Brunswick ==
Buried in the Byrne Commission report was a recommendation to abolish municipal tax concessions. Section 3 of Bill 118, which was to become the Assessment Act, read:

... all provincial, municipal or local taxes or rates on real estate property shall be calculated and levied upon the whole of the assessment or assessments made under this Act.

This sparked many lawsuits, including some that went to the Supreme Court of Canada, over what was meant by "real estate property": see Bathurst Paper Limited v. Minister of Municipal Affairs of NB (1971), Minister of Municipal Affairs (N.B.) v Canaport Ltd (1975) and Irving Oil Co v Minister of Municipal Affairs of NB (1975).

== Notes ==
=== Bibliography ===
- Hunt, Russell (1973). K.C. Irving - The Art of the Industrialist. Toronto: McClelland & Stewart. ISBN 9780771042874.
- MacMillan, Gail (1978). An Outline of the History of Bathurst. Sackville, NB: The Tribune Press.
