= John Ferguson (New Brunswick politician) =

Canadian politician

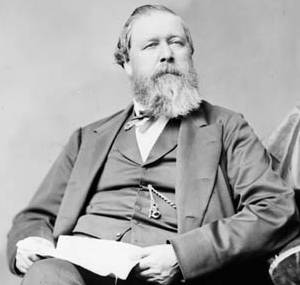
John Ferguson Source: Library and Archives Canada

John Ferguson (November 20, 1813 – August 21, 1888) was a timber merchant and political figure in New Brunswick, Canada. He was a member of the Legislative Council of New Brunswick from 1864 to 1867. Ferguson was called to the Senate of Canada for the Bathurst, New Brunswick division in 1867 and served until his death in 1888.

== Biography ==
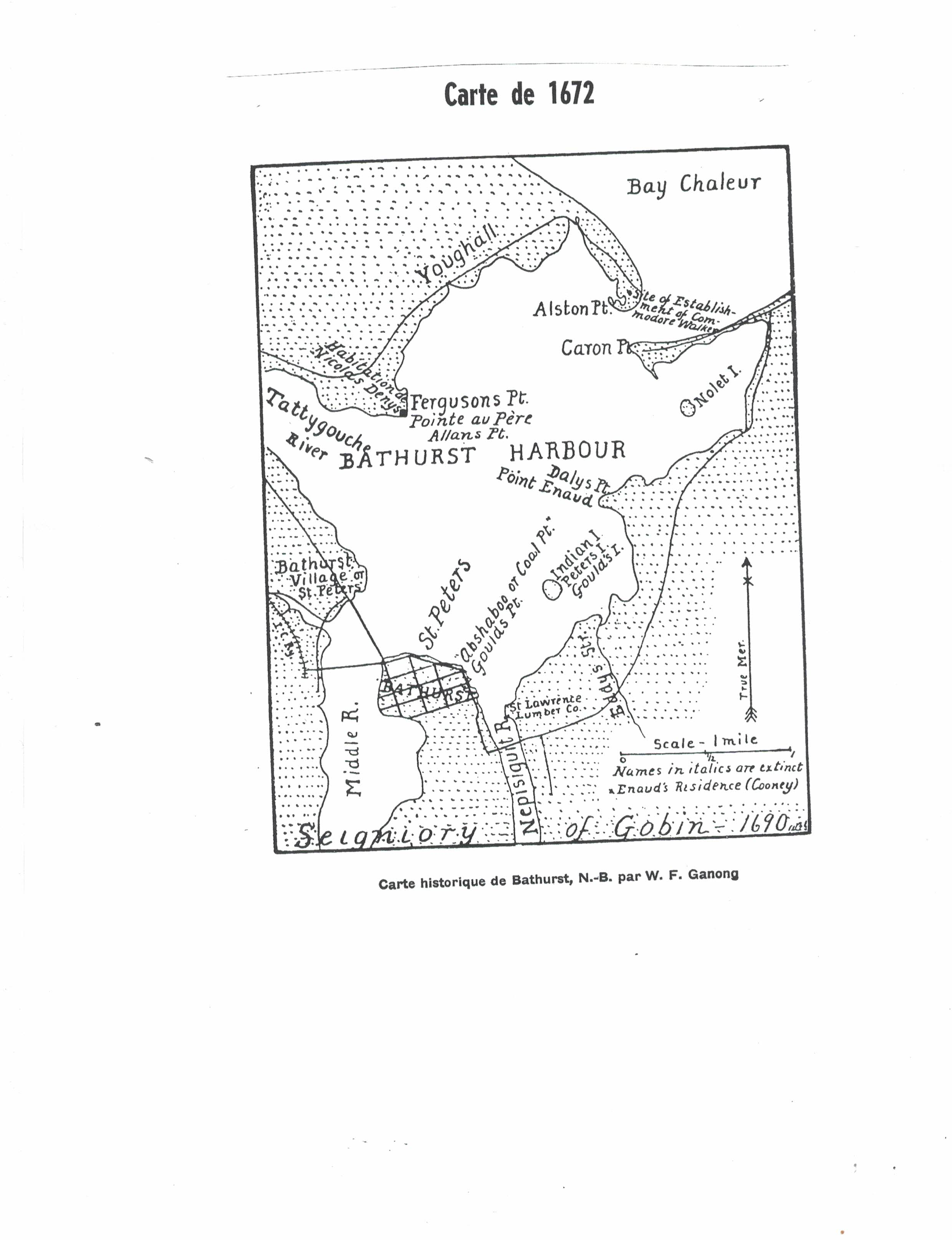
Map of Bathurst Harbour prior to 1900, drawn by W. F. Ganong. Ferguson's Point can be seen at centre-left, at the estuary of the 'Tattygouche River'.

Ferguson was born the son of Robert (1772–1851) and his wife Agnes Logan in Old Hull, Dunlop, Ayrshire, Scotland, where he was educated and grew into manhood. He emigrated at the age of 19 to Newcastle, New Brunswick in 1832, in order to work for Gilmour, Rankin and Company and came north to Bathurst in 1836 to establish a branch plant, which was named Ferguson, Rankin and Co. He continued in this way his association with the Liverpool-based Rankin, Gilmour and Company.

In 1847, Ferguson married Mary Munro, the youngest daughter of Hugh Munro. They would come to live at the mouth of the Tetagouche River on Bathurst Harbour, in an estate they called Gowan Brae. One of their housekeepers was a destitute young widow named Eliza Dunn, mother to James Hamet Dunn; in this way, Mrs. Dunn was allowed to provide for her son at the Ferguson family home. The son would later grow to become a formidable entrepreneur in the pattern of his benefactor.

Ferguson commanded the Gloucester County militia from the position of lieutenant-colonel for a number of years. He was also a board member of the Dominion Rifle Association.

Ferguson lies buried in the old Presbyterian cemetery in West Bathurst.
