= Patrick J. Burns =

- Born: c.1845 County Tipperary, Ireland
- Died: 23 February 1915 (aged 70); Bathurst, New Brunswick
- Known for: inaugural Mayor of Bathurst, New Brunswick
- Spouse: Elizabeth White
- Children: 1 son, 2 daughters

Patrick J. Burns (c. 1845 – 23 February 1915) was the inaugural Mayor of Bathurst, New Brunswick, from the foundation of the Town in October 1912 until his death in office of heart disease on 23 February 1915.

Burns was in 1895 a principal of the re-formed Adams, Burns and Company, a successor upon bankruptcy of the St. Lawrence Lumber Company.

Burns was born in County Tipperary, Ireland; a Catholic, he lived until 70 years of age. He fathered with wife Elizabeth White one son, Kennedy Francis, and two daughters, firstborn Mary Agnes and youngest Monique Vincent.
