= Sacred Heart Cathedral (Bathurst, New Brunswick) =

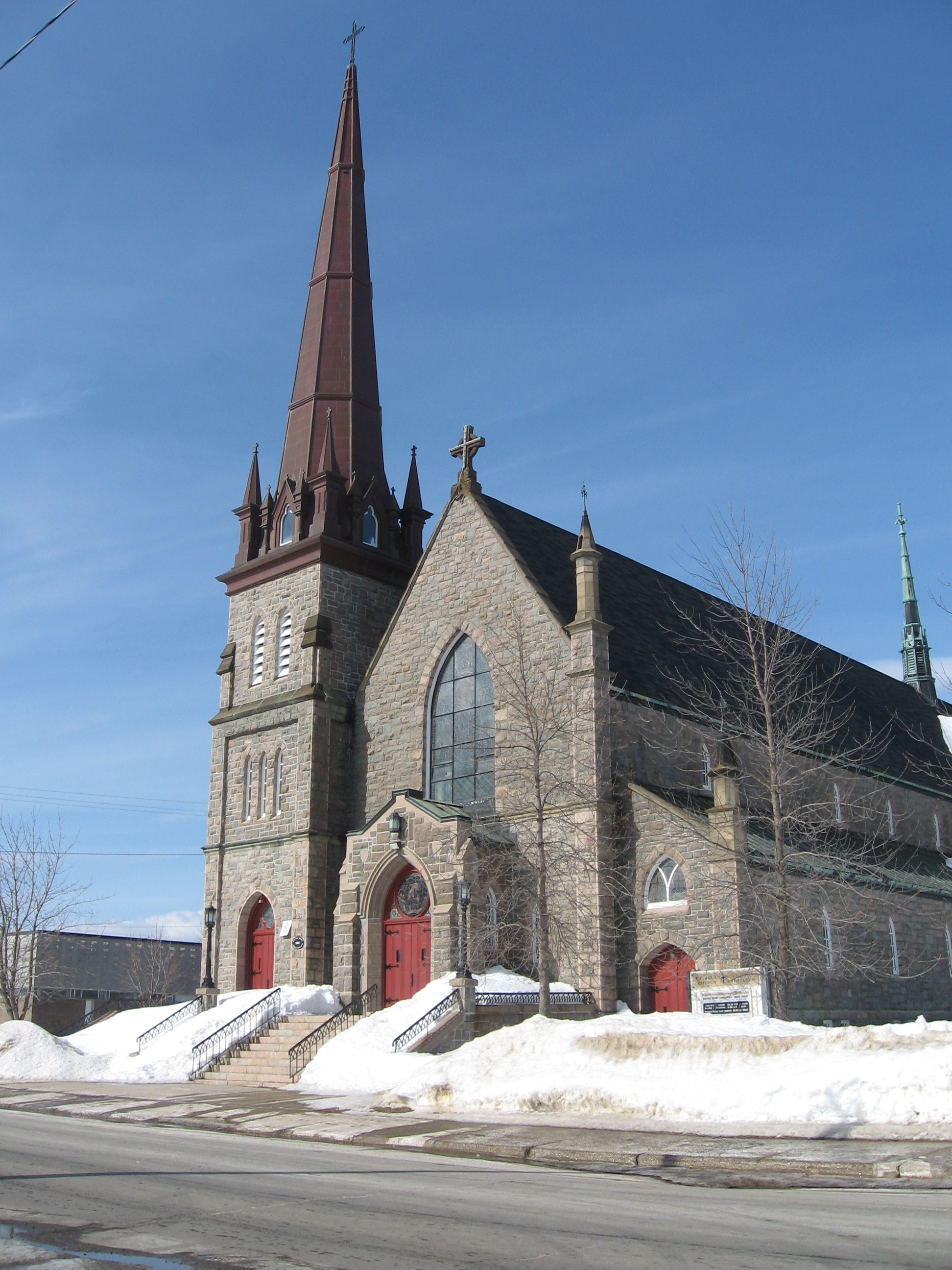
- Sacred Heart Cathedral
- Sacred Heart Cathedral
- 47.6178°N 65.6554°W
- Location: Bathurst, New Brunswick
- Country: Canada
- Denomination: Roman Catholic

History
- Status: Cathedral

Architecture
- Functional status: Active
- Architectural type: Norman-Gothic

Sacred Heart Cathedral is a Roman Catholic cathedral in Bathurst, New Brunswick, Canada.

The parish was founded in 1881. It became a cathedral in 1938 when the Diocese of Chatham was moved to Bathurst.
