= Hugh Munro (New Brunswick settler) =

Canadian politician

Hugh Munro was a merchant, justice of the peace, judge, politician, office holder, farmer, and agriculturalist.

== Biography ==
Munro was born 1764 in Ross-shire, Scotland. He wed Martha and was the father of three sons and three daughters, the youngest of whom married John Ferguson.

Munro arrived at what would later become Bathurst, New Brunswick in 1794 and who around 1800 was the founder of "the first and most ancient establishment" in the timber trade of Nepisiguit Bay. In 1807 Munro was appointed a justice of the peace and judge of the Inferior Court of Common Pleas for Northumberland County, He was first elected as one of the members of the Legislative Assembly for Northumberland County at the general election of 1820, and maintained that office until the dissolution of that body in 1827. In 1828 he was elected to sit in the 9th New Brunswick Legislature when the county of Gloucester was given its first representative. Munro was also registrar of wills and deeds, and trustee of the grammar school, when it was established about 1836.

Munro was granted 500 acres on the banks of the Tetagouche River and named his residence Somerset Vale; part of his estate is now the location of the local hospital. He was a successful agriculturalist, and organized and was the first president of the Gloucester County Agricultural Society, formed in 1828.

Munro died on 25 September 1846 in Bathurst, and is buried downtown at the old Church of England cemetery.
