= W. J. Kent =

Canadian politician (1860–1943)

W.J. Kent
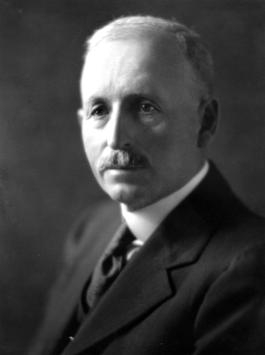
- Born: December 24, 1860; Tetagouche, New Brunswick
- Died: September 8, 1943 (aged 82); Bathurst, New Brunswick
- Occupations: Merchant, Bathurst Mayor
- Spouse: Christina Dutch Kent
- Children: Morley, J. Harold, George, Margaret, Adelaide, Elizabeth, J. Harper

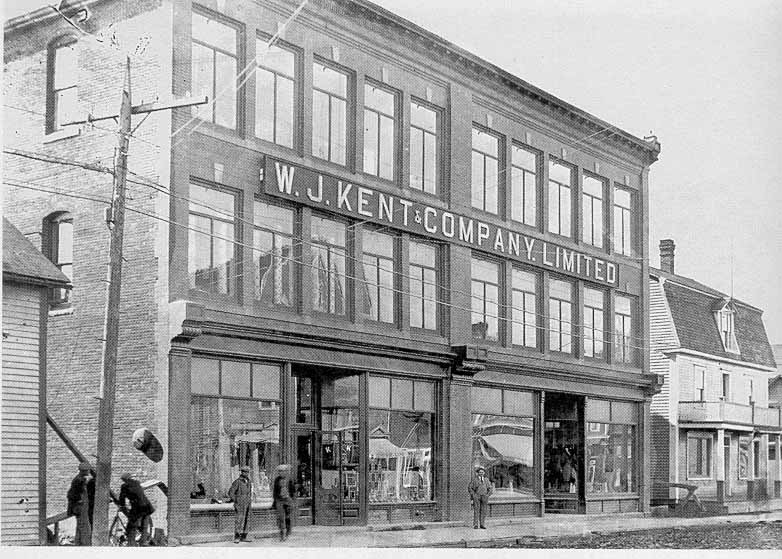
W.J. Kent & Company store circa 1920

William Joseph Kent (December 24, 1860 – September 8, 1943) was a business and political leader in Bathurst, New Brunswick in Canada. Kent's business enterprises were significant in the economic development of the region, and Kent was a founding alderman in Bathurst's first town council for sixteen years before serving as mayor of Bathurst for two terms.

== Family background ==
Kent was born to Hannah Branch and Joseph Kent. His grandfather (also named Joseph Kent) was an immigrant from Cornwall, England and was a pioneer in the development of the mining industry in New Brunswick. However, having not found sufficient success in mining, in 1842 the elder Joseph Kent bought land near Tetagouche and prospered as a farmer and blacksmith. The younger Joseph Kent bought his own farm near Bathurst in 1873. The Joseph Kent Farm, where W.J. Kent lived as a child, is now on the Canadian Register of Historic Places.

== W.J. Kent & Company, Ltd. ==
=== Kent's department store ===
In the early 1880s, W.J. Kent worked in the company store of the West Bathurst lumber firm of R.A. and J. Stewart. Wanting to open his own store, Kent went to Saint John to study at Kerr's Business College. In 1884, at the age of 23, Kent opened a small wood-frame store in downtown Bathurst and organized W.J. Kent & Company, Ltd. Catering primarily to the local farming community, it was the first general goods store in the area that was not owned by one of the large mining or lumber companies. The store proved popular, and in 1901, Kent built a larger brick building at 150 Main Street to house his growing enterprise. In 1914, the store was expanded again, and a third story was added to the complex creating what was then the largest department store in New Brunswick.

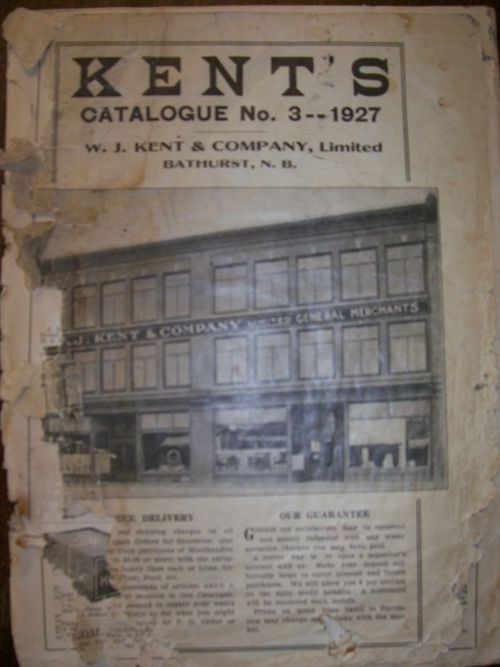
1927 catalogue

Founded by Kent's son, J. Harold Kent, Kent's department store ran a successful catalogue business that rivaled Eaton's at its peak. The products offered for sale ranged from flour and animal feed to automobiles. In the 1950s and 1960s Kent's catalogue became nationally known as a supplier of mining equipment and supplies. A copy of the 1927 catalogue is in the collection of the Nepisiquit Centennial Museum.

In 1953, the company opened the first large supermarket in Bathurst next door to the department store on Main Street. It remained in operation until 1974.

Kent's department store was a fixture of downtown Bathurst and was well known for its use of a pneumatic tube cash system that was among the last to be used in Canada. Rather than having a cash register at every counter, all transactions were handled by a central cashier who took payments and returned change through a tube system that connected to all the departments on all three floors.

Kent's department store closed in September, 1990 after being in business for 106 years. The main building was subsequently torn down, but one of the warehouses continued to be used by the Bathurst Farmers Market.

=== Other business interests ===
W.J. Kent & Company founded or owned many other Bathurst area businesses in addition to the department store. They included the Gloucester Hotel, Carleton Hotel, Kent Motel, Gloucester Dry Cleaning and Laundry, Bathurst Laundromat, Kent Sales, Northern Storage, Bathurst Propane, Miramichi Propane, Bathurst Ready Mix, Kent Farms, Kent Trailer Park, Capital Lanes Bowling Alley, Kent Lodge Resort, Chaleur Beach Picnic Site and Trailer Park, Kent Shoes, Bay-View Trailer Park, Bay-View Drive-In Theater, and Kent Theater.

== Witness to the Great Fire of 1892 ==
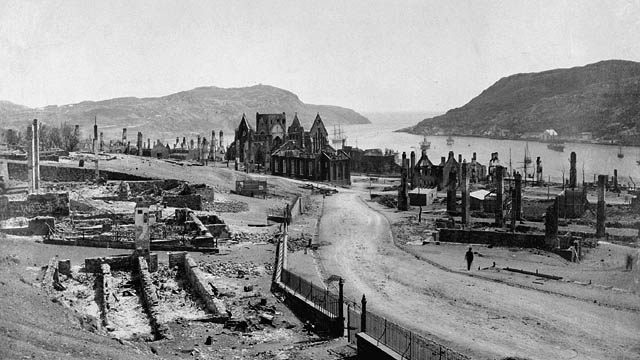
St. John's after the fire

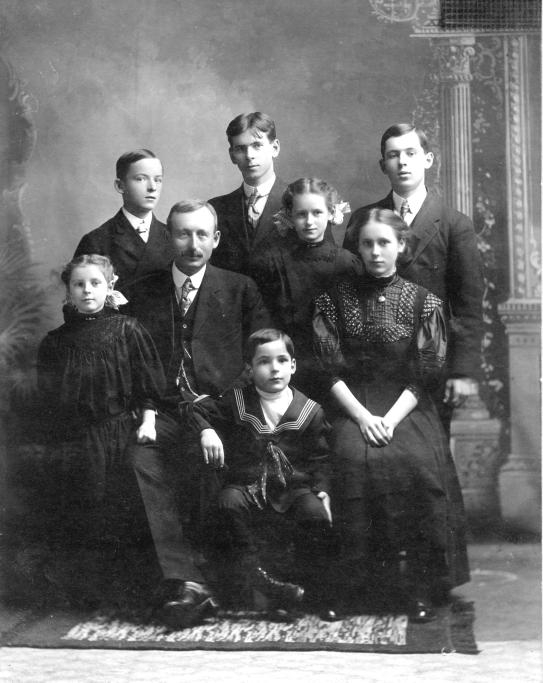
Kent family portrait circa 1908

Kent was visiting St. John's, Newfoundland when he bore witness to the Great Fire of 1892. He authored a book about the event titled, A Directory Containing Names and Present Addresses of Professional Men, Merchants and Shopkeepers, Burnt out by the General Conflagration of July 8th, 1892; A Full Account of the Great Fire, the Customs' Tariff and Other Matter of General Information. Published in 1892, Kent's book came to be recognized as the definitive account of the disaster.

== Legacy ==
Kent had seven children with his wife Christina Dutch Kent, but three of his four sons died at young ages. Morley Kent was killed in action over Belgium in 1918 while with the Royal Flying Corps in World War I. His oldest son, J. Harold Kent, survived combat duty in France during the war. He married Marjorie Young, the daughter of Frederick T. B. Young, and had two children. Harold, who managed the department store and who founded its catalogue business, was W.J. Kent's heir apparent until he died unexpectedly of pneumonia in 1928. George Kent, who then was being groomed to lead the business, died in 1942.

Upon W.J. Kent's death in 1943, he was survived by his three daughters (Margaret, Adelaide, and Elizabeth) but management of all of Kent's business interests fell to his youngest son, J. Harper Kent. Harper Kent managed W.J. Kent & Company until his death in 1987. The W.J. Kent fortune was largely distributed to charity by Harper Kent and his wife Gwendolyn. One of the recipients, the J. Harper Kent Charitable Foundation, is active in providing college scholarships to high school graduates from the Bathurst area.

The W.J. Kent archives are housed at the Bathurst Museum, now known as the Nepisiquit Centennial Museum and Cultural Centre.
