= Northern New Brunswick and Seaboard Railway =

The Northern New Brunswick and Seaboard Railway is often cited as having operated the shortest length of standard-gauge track of any railway company. In 1904, the province authorized the railway to construct a 26-kilometre line between Nepisiguit Junction and Grand Falls to serve the Drummond Iron Mines, which had been discovered in 1897 by William Hussey. By 1903, the Austin Brook Iron Mine had been established and operated under the name Drummond until its closure in 1913.

The mine entered receivership for a brief period before the Dominion Steel and Coal Company acquired the operating rights from Canadian Iron Industries, which held the lease.

Between 1920 and 1926, construction of the Nepisiguit Falls hydroelectric dam and generating station required twice-daily return trips by steam locomotive. After construction was completed, transportation was provided by a gasoline-powered jitney, trolley, or steel-wheeled automobile, until renewed interest in the area emerged in the early 1950s following the development of the Brunswick Mine..

In 1955, a highway was constructed to the mine site, and two years later the railway rails were sold for scrap.
