= Samuel Napier (Canadian politician) =

Canadian politician

Samuel Hawkins Napier (c. 1837 – June 1902) was a Scottish-born prospector and political figure in New Brunswick. He represented Gloucester in the Legislative Assembly of New Brunswick from 1870 to 1874.

He came to Bonaventure, Province of Canada with his family while still young, soon afterwards moving to Bathurst, where he grew up. In 1857, Napier worked his way to the gold fields of Australia aboard the New Brunswick clipper Marco Polo. With his brother Charles, he discovered the largest recorded gold nugget ever discovered at that time, with a weight of 54 kilograms. Napier returned to Bathurst but spent his share of the profits. He later moved to Ottawa and worked with a timber company operating on the Gatineau River. He later died in a cabin deep in the woods of the upper Ottawa Valley.
