= Bathurst, New Brunswick =

City in New Brunswick, Canada

Bathurst
- City
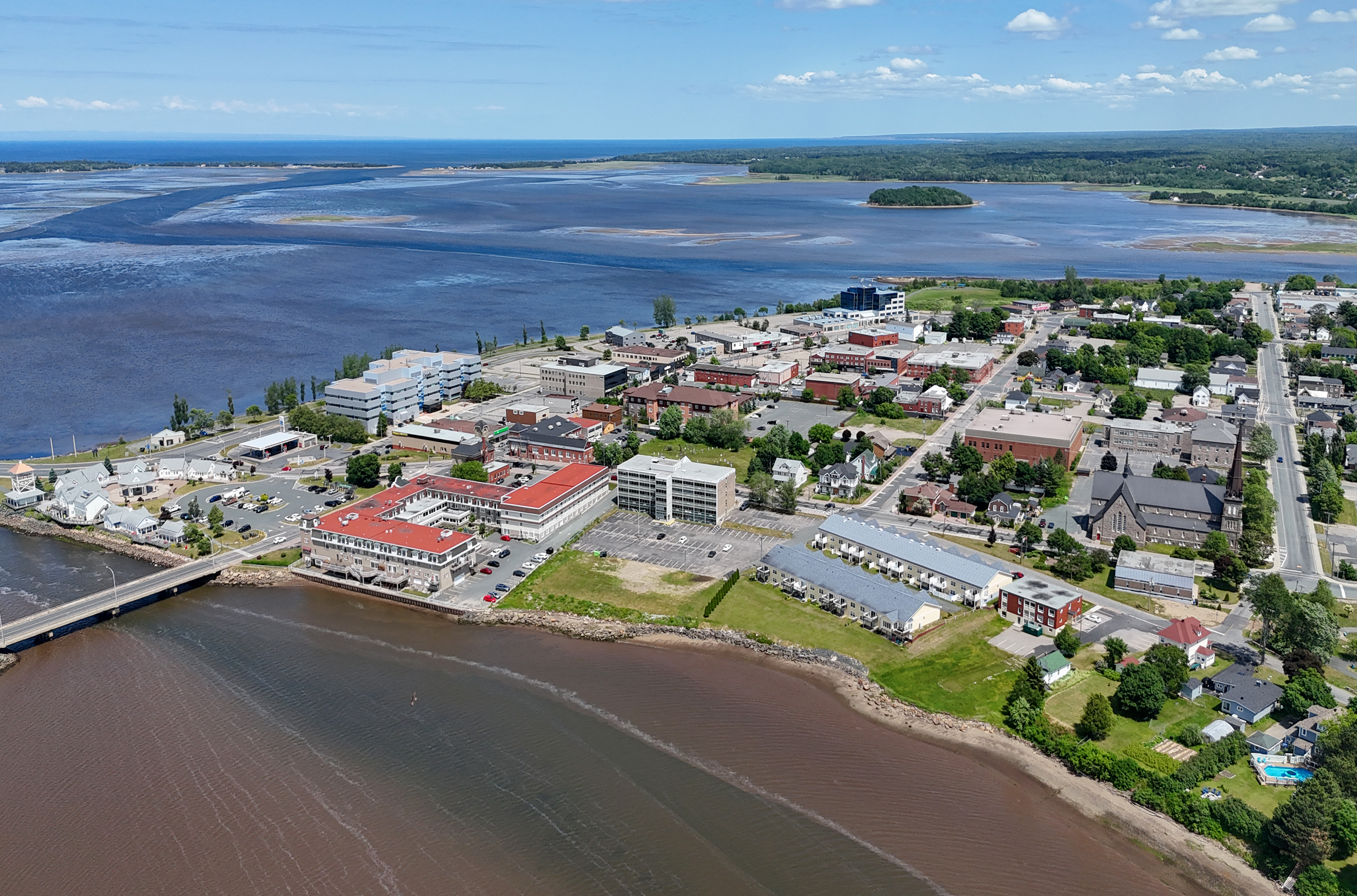
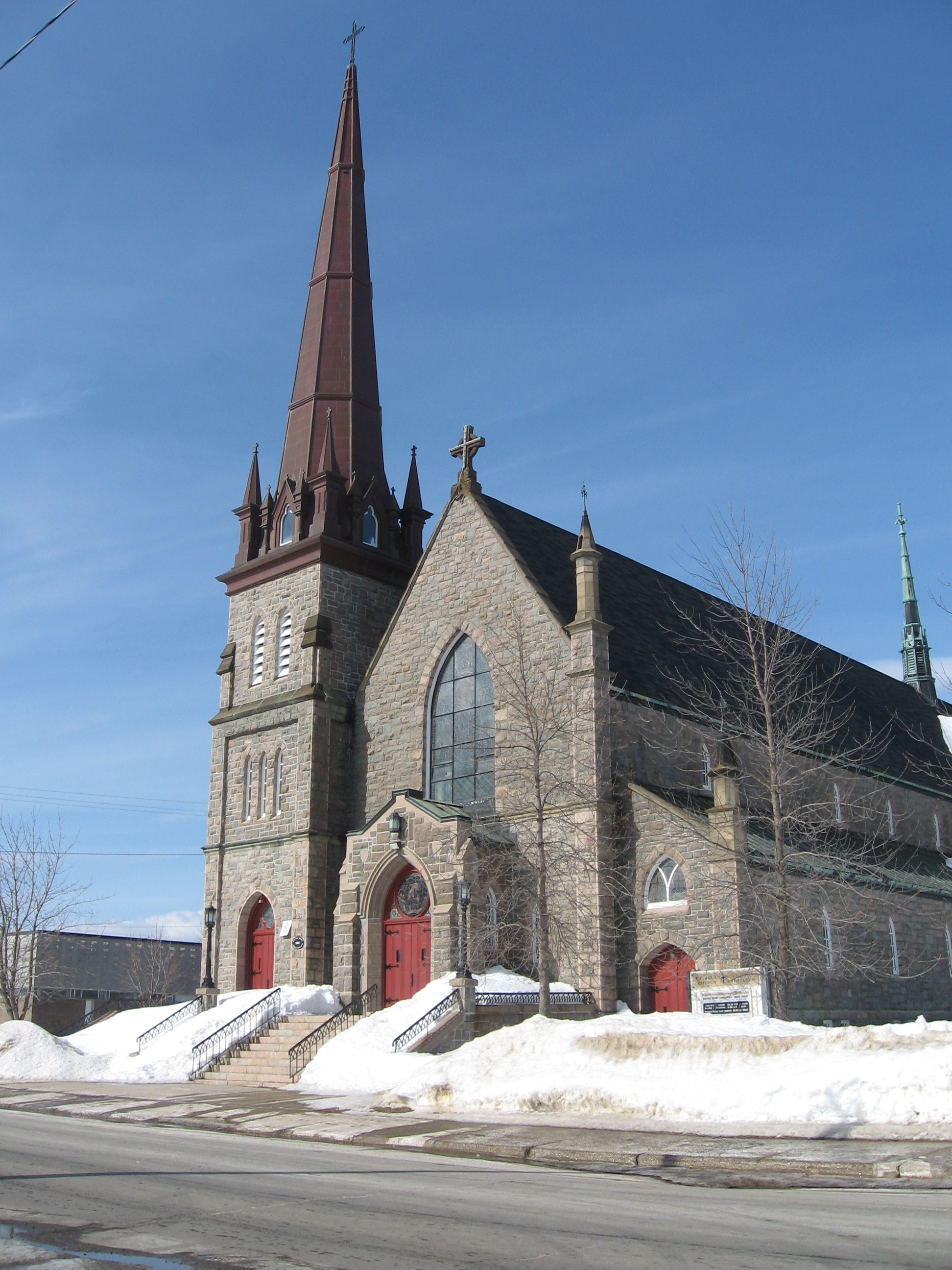
- Downtown Sacred Heart Cathedral Welcome sign

- Coat of arms
- Motto: See What Awaits You
- Location within New Brunswick.
- Coordinates: 47.62°N 65.65°W
- Country: Canada
- Province: New Brunswick
- County: Gloucester
- Parish: Bathurst
- Settled: 1600s
- Town: 1912
- City: 1966
- Electoral Districts Federal: Acadie—Bathurst
- Provincial: Bathurst East-Nepisiguit-Saint-Isidore; Bathurst West-Beresford

Government
  - Type: City Council
  - Mayor: Kim Chamberlain
  - Councillors: List of Members: Stephen J. Brunet; Dale Knowles; Jean-François Leblanc; Rickey Hondas; Michael Willett; Penny Anderson; Stephen Legacy; Mike Skerry; Darryl Branch

Area
  - Land: 91.62 km^{2} (35.37 sq mi)
  - Urban: 69.85 km^{2} (26.97 sq mi)
  - Metro: 2,087.97 km^{2} (806.17 sq mi)
- Highest elevation: 62 m (203 ft)
- Lowest elevation: 0 m (0 ft)

Population (2021)
  - City: 12,157
  - Density: 132.7/km^{2} (344/sq mi)
  - Urban: 18,154
  - Urban density: 260/km^{2} (670/sq mi)
  - Metro: 30,424
  - Metro density: 15/km^{2} (39/sq mi)
  - Change 2016-2021: ▲2.2%
  - Dwellings: 6,445
- Time zone: UTC−4 (AST)
  - Summer (DST): UTC−3 (ADT)
- Postal code(s): E2A
- Area codes: 506: Area exchanges: 226 252 254 255 265 350 416 480 496 498 499 500 513 527 543 544 545 546 547 548 549 655 828 881 984 989
- Highways Route 8 Route 11 Route 134 Route 180: Route 315; Route 322; Route 430
- NTS Map: 21P12 Bathurst
- GNBC Code: DAFQX
- Website: bathurst.ca

Bathurst (/ˈbætərst/) is a city in northern New Brunswick with a population of 12,157 and the 4th largest metropolitan area in New Brunswick as defined by Census Canada with a population of 31,387 as of 2021. The City of Bathurst overlooks Nepisiguit Bay, which is part of Chaleur Bay, and is at the estuary of the Nepisiguit River.

== Geography ==
A map of Bathurst.

Bathurst is on Nepisiguit Bay, which is part of Chaleur Bay, at the mouth of four rivers: the Nepisiguit River, Middle River, Little River, and the Tetagouche River. Two spits of land, Carron Point and Alston Point, form the enclosure for the harbour. Youghall Beach Park lies to the north of town. Bathurst is located 90 km (56 mi) southeast of Dalhousie, and 75 km (47 mi) north of Miramichi.

Bathurst's waste management facility is located south of the city, in Allardville. The city's sewage treatment plant is located within the harbor, at the northern end of Riverside Drive, behind the Canadian Tire. City water comes from Middle River.

Several of the salt marshes around Bathurst Harbour play host to a Chaleur Bay-specific butterfly: the Maritime Ringlet, which flies late July to late August.

== Attractions ==
- La Promenade Waterfront is cluster of shops, art, boutiques, a visitor information centre, and an outdoor pavilion that hosts a variety of activities throughout the year. There are boardwalks with views of the Nepisiguit Bay.
- Youghall Beach Park offers swimming, volleyball, and windsurfing. The Bathurst Marina is also located next to the beach.
- Bathurst has two golf courses; Gowan Brae and Squire Green.
- Bathurst Hospitality Days is a week-long festival with many activities for the young and old. It includes four nights of concerts, featuring a mix of classic rock, Acadian and maritime music.
- Bathurst Chamber Music Festival is an annual week-long classical music festival which features over 30 emerging musicians and composers from around Canada and abroad. It was created to help build appreciation, as well as to create a necessity for classical music within the community.

== Government and politics ==
Bathurst has a Mayor–council form of government, with seven at-large councillors. Elections are held quadrennially in May, as are all since 2004 local governments in New Brunswick. Mayor Fongemie won over a field of four candidates with 3,064 votes; the next candidate garnered 1,831 votes. In 2016, 21 candidates put their names on the ballot. The minimum number of votes needed for election was 2,347. Councillor Stever won more votes than the Mayor.

At the 2014 New Brunswick general election, 4,367 residents of Bathurst West-Beresford elected Brian Kenny, while 4,431 residents in Bathurst East-Nepisiguit-Saint-Isidore chose Denis Landry. Both are member of the New Brunswick Liberal Association, and both are cabinet ministers in the Brian Gallant government.

Bathurst is a part of the Acadie—Bathurst federal riding, and represented since 2015 in the House of Commons of Canada by Liberal Party of Canada member Serge Cormier.

Bathurst is the county seat of Gloucester County, New Brunswick. As such it is home to the county court house and houses much of the province's regional administration.

== Education ==
=== Primary ===
- École Place-des-Jeunes (6 - 8)
- Superior Middle School (6 - 8)
- Académie Assomption (K - 5)
- École Cité-de-l'Amitié (K - 5)
- Terry Fox Elementary School (K - 5)
- Parkwood Heights Elementary School (K - 5)

=== Secondary ===
- Bathurst High School (BHS): in English, grades 9 - 12 are taught at BHS. The school district is known administratively as "Anglophone North Subdistrict 3", and Sheila Rogers was acclaimed to it in May 2016.
- École Secondaire Népisiguit (ESN): in French, grades 9 - 12 are taught at ESN. The school district is known administratively as "Francophone Nord-est - Subdistrict 4", and Danny Comeau was acclaimed to it in May 2016.

=== Post-secondary ===
French-language postsecondary studies are offered at the Bathurst campuses of College communautaire du Nouveau-Brunswick (CCNB-NBCC). Many Anglophones study elsewhere; the nearest English NBCC campus is roughly 90 km (56 mi) south in Miramichi.

== Health sector ==
Chaleur Regional Hospital looks after the needs of the community at 1750 Sunset Drive Bathurst, E2A 4L7, in the north of town. It was given in 2013 a rating of 'A+' by the CBC's The Fifth Estate programme in a national survey of 66 hospitals.

== Demographics ==
In the 2021 Census of Population conducted by Statistics Canada, Bathurst had a population of 12,157 living in 5,824 of its 6,445 total private dwellings, a change of 2.2% from its 2016 population of 11,897. With a land area of 91.62 km^{2} (35.37 sq mi), it had a population density of 132.7/km^{2} (343.7/sq mi) in 2021.

Canada census – Bathurst community profile

	2021	2016	2011
Population	12,157 (+2.2% from 2016)	11,897 (-3.1% from 2011)	12,275 (-3.5% from 2006)
Land area	91.62 km^{2} (35.37 sq mi)	92.04 km^{2} (35.54 sq mi)	91.86 km^{2} (35.47 sq mi)
Population density	132.7/km^{2} (344/sq mi)	129.3/km^{2} (335/sq mi)	133.6/km^{2} (346/sq mi)
Median age	53.2 (M: 51.2, F: 55.2)	52.5 (M: 51.2, F: 53.7)	48.9 (M: 47.5, F: 50.1)
Private dwellings	6,445 (total) 5,824 (occupied)	6,317 (total)	6,257 (total)
Median household income	$54,800	$46,379	$44,167

References: 2021 2016 2011

>Historical Census Data - Bathurst, New Brunswick

Year	Pop.	±%
1871	600	—
1901	1,044	+74.0%
1911	960	−8.0%
1921	3,327	+246.6%
1931	3,300	−0.8%
1941	3,554	+7.7%

Year	Pop.	±%
1951	4,453	+25.3%
1961	5,494	+23.4%
1971	16,674	+203.5%
1981	15,705	−5.8%
1986	14,683	−6.5%
1991	14,409	−1.9%

Year	Pop.	±%
1996	13,815	−4.1%
2001	12,924	−6.4%
2006	12,714	−1.6%
2011	12,275	−3.5%
2016	11,897	−3.1%
2021	12,157	+2.2%

=== Language ===
Bathurst is officially bilingual, (English and French) with English, French, Irish and Scottish heritage. The city is also home to Míkmaq natives, with the Pabineau First Nations (Kekwapskuk) community on the outskirts of the city.

Canada Census Mother Tongue - Bathurst, New Brunswick
Census	Total	French			English			French & English			Other		
Year	Responses	Count	Trend	Pop %	Count	Trend	Pop %	Count	Trend	Pop %	Count	Trend	Pop %
2021	11,740	5,520	▼1.69%	47.01%	5,470	▲3.11%	46.59%	410	▲60.78%	3.49%	330	▲3.49%	2.81%
2016	11,470	5,615	▼4.18%	48.95%	5,305	▼1.05%	46.25%	255	▲10.87%	2.22%	290	▲52.63%	2.52%
2011	11,865	5,860	▼6.5%	49.39%	5,585	▼2.6%	47.07%	230	▼4.2%	1.94%	190	▲31.0%	1.60%
2006	12,385	6,265	▲1.0%	50.58%	5,735	▼4.7%	46.31%	240	▼28.4%	1.94%	145	▲107.1%	1.17%
2001	12,625	6,205	▼6.3%	49.15%	6,015	▼8.7%	47.64%	335	▲19.6%	2.65%	70	▼12.5%	0.55%
1996	13,570	6,625	n/a	48.82%	6,585	n/a	48.53%	280	n/a	2.06%	80	n/a	0.59%

== Community organizations and churches ==
Bathurst has many community-based organisations, including:

- Synergies Chaleur
- Royal Canadian Legion, Branch No. 18
- New Brunswick Association for Community Living
- Maison Doucet Hennessy House (an architectural heritage project)
- St. George's Anglican Church
- Holy Family Catholic Church
- Bathurst Pastoral Charge First United Church
- Evangel Bathurst Church

== Legend of the Phantom Ship ==
The Bay of Chaleur is known for its phantom ship legend, which dates back more than two centuries. The story claims that a sail ship burned in the waters north of the city - possibly from the Battle of the Restigouche - and that the ghost of the vessel and its crew is visible on the water in certain weather and light conditions to this day. Though some believe it is a ghost ship from the Battle of the Restigouche, others believe it is merely caused by heat waves, reflections, or hallucinations. A drawing of a ghost wielding an anchor and two menacing sailors could be seen on the city's old welcome sign.

== Climate ==
In spite of its coastal position, Bathurst experiences a humid continental climate (Köppen climate classification Dfb) with vast seasonal differences in temperature. Summers are warm and humid. Winters are often cold, windy and snowy. Spring and Fall bring chilly to warm temperatures. In fall, late heat waves known as "Indian summer" are a common occurrence.

During winter, snow generally stays on the ground from December until April.

The highest temperature ever recorded in Bathurst was 37.6 °C (99.7 °F) on 19 June 2024, which is also the warmest June temperature ever recorded in the province of New Brunswick. The coldest temperature ever recorded was −37.2 °C (−35 °F) on 9 January 1887 and 19 January 1925.

Climate data for Bathurst Airport, 1991−2020 normals, extremes 1872−present (Note: Climate data was recorded in the area of downtown Bathurst from July 1872 to June 1992 and at Bathurst Airport from July 1992 to present.)
Month	Jan	Feb	Mar	Apr	May	Jun	Jul	Aug	Sep	Oct	Nov	Dec	Year
Record high humidex	15.6	14.0	25.3	26.9	40.5	45.0	43.3	42.8	40.6	32.5	26.0	18.0	45.0
Record high °C (°F)	13.5 (56.3)	14.5 (58.1)	24.5 (76.1)	29.4 (84.9)	33.7 (92.7)	37.6 (99.7)	37.2 (99.0)	37.2 (99.0)	35.4 (95.7)	30.0 (86.0)	24.4 (75.9)	15.0 (59.0)	37.6 (99.7)
Mean maximum °C (°F)	7.0 (44.6)	6.1 (43.0)	11.5 (52.7)	19.7 (67.5)	27.3 (81.1)	31.4 (88.5)	32.2 (90.0)	31.8 (89.2)	28.8 (83.8)	22.4 (72.3)	16.0 (60.8)	8.9 (48.0)	33.7 (92.7)
Mean daily maximum °C (°F)	−5.2 (22.6)	−3.7 (25.3)	1.6 (34.9)	8.2 (46.8)	15.8 (60.4)	21.8 (71.2)	25.1 (77.2)	24.4 (75.9)	19.7 (67.5)	12.0 (53.6)	4.8 (40.6)	−1.5 (29.3)	10.2 (50.4)
Daily mean °C (°F)	−10.6 (12.9)	−9.5 (14.9)	−3.8 (25.2)	3.1 (37.6)	9.7 (49.5)	15.5 (59.9)	19.1 (66.4)	18.3 (64.9)	13.5 (56.3)	6.9 (44.4)	0.6 (33.1)	−6.1 (21.0)	4.7 (40.5)
Mean daily minimum °C (°F)	−16 (3)	−15.1 (4.8)	−9.3 (15.3)	−2 (28)	3.5 (38.3)	9.2 (48.6)	13.1 (55.6)	12.2 (54.0)	7.3 (45.1)	1.8 (35.2)	−3.6 (25.5)	−10.6 (12.9)	−0.8 (30.6)
Mean minimum °C (°F)	−28.4 (−19.1)	−28.0 (−18.4)	−23.6 (−10.5)	−10.3 (13.5)	−2.9 (26.8)	1.4 (34.5)	7.0 (44.6)	5.4 (41.7)	−0.4 (31.3)	−5.4 (22.3)	−13.8 (7.2)	−22.8 (−9.0)	−30.3 (−22.5)
Record low °C (°F)	−37.2 (−35.0)	−34.4 (−29.9)	−33.5 (−28.3)	−21.7 (−7.1)	−9.4 (15.1)	−2.2 (28.0)	0.0 (32.0)	−3.3 (26.1)	−7.8 (18.0)	−17.8 (0.0)	−25 (−13)	−33.9 (−29.0)	−37.2 (−35.0)
Record low wind chill	−42.4	−42.7	−34.4	−25.2	−7.9	−3.4	0.0	0.0	−6.4	−12.4	−26.2	−38.0	−42.7
Average precipitation mm (inches)	81.8 (3.22)	72.1 (2.84)	87.0 (3.43)	78.1 (3.07)	108.2 (4.26)	98.9 (3.89)	99.3 (3.91)	87.5 (3.44)	88.3 (3.48)	119.6 (4.71)	97.2 (3.83)	99.8 (3.93)	1,117.7 (44.00)
Average rainfall mm (inches)	18.1 (0.71)	9.9 (0.39)	21.3 (0.84)	47.5 (1.87)	106.5 (4.19)	98.9 (3.89)	99.3 (3.91)	87.5 (3.44)	88.3 (3.48)	113.3 (4.46)	75.9 (2.99)	34.6 (1.36)	801.0 (31.54)
Average snowfall cm (inches)	71.1 (28.0)	69.4 (27.3)	67.6 (26.6)	30.2 (11.9)	1.7 (0.7)	0.0 (0.0)	0.0 (0.0)	0.0 (0.0)	0.0 (0.0)	6.4 (2.5)	22.4 (8.8)	68.3 (26.9)	337.1 (132.7)
Average precipitation days (≥ 0.2 mm)	12.9	10.4	12.1	13.2	15.3	13.1	14.7	13.5	12.0	14.0	13.0	14.1	158.1
Average rainy days (≥ 0.2 mm)	3.2	2.2	4.7	10.2	15.3	13.1	14.7	13.5	12.0	13.8	9.6	5.6	117.7
Average snowy days (≥ 0.2 cm)	11.8	9.7	9.9	5.7	0.40	0.0	0.0	0.0	0.0	0.85	5.5	11.0	54.7
Average relative humidity (%)	68.6	62.9	61.2	57.3	54.8	56.2	59.1	57.9	59.2	62.6	68.0	72.6	61.7
Average dew point °C (°F)	−13.5 (7.7)	−13.2 (8.2)	−8.5 (16.7)	−3.0 (26.6)	3.7 (38.7)	9.7 (49.5)	14.1 (57.4)	13.3 (55.9)	9.3 (48.7)	3.0 (37.4)	−2.9 (26.8)	−8.9 (16.0)	0.3 (32.5)
Source 1: Environment Canada
Source 2: weatherstats.ca (for dewpoint and monthly&yearly average absolute maximum&minimum temperature)

== History ==
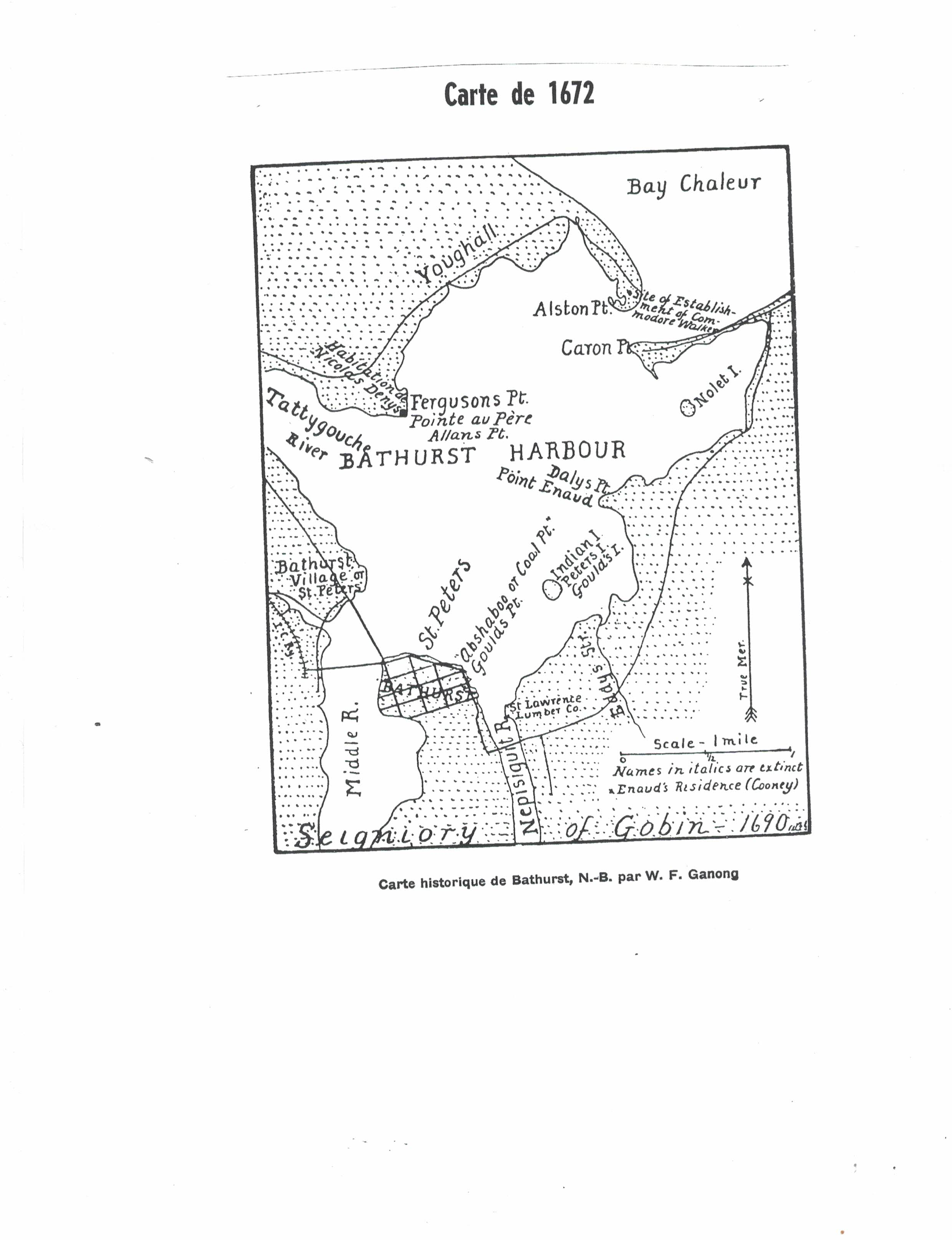
Map of Bathurst Harbour prior to 1900, drawn by W. F. Ganong.

Bathurst had been the location of the annual Mi'kmaq summer coastal community of Nepisiguit prior to European settlement. Europeans first reached the shores of the Baie des Chaleurs when in 1534 it was named by Jacques Cartier. Early settlers from France came to the area in the 17th century in what became part of the colony of Acadia. In 1607 Samuel de Champlain sailed into the Miramichi, and in 1636, Nicolas Denys was granted a seignory by the French crown, apparently the third grant in the colony of Acadie. Jean Jacques Enaud, who hailed from the French Basque Country, was granted in 1638 the seignory at the southeastern gap of the harbor later named Alston Point. Remark is made on William Francis Ganong's map of Bathurst Harbour, depicted here at left, of the residence of Nicolas Denys and the seignory of Gobin.

Little is known about the region between the death of Nicholas Denys in 1688 and the Treaty of Utrecht (1713), whereby Louis XIV ceded the territory of Acadia to Anne, Queen of Great Britain. Although it was marked as an inlet, the Nepisiguit river was not noted in a British map dated 1744, although by 1755 Thomas Jefferys illustrates the "Nipisiki River" and "Nipisighit Bay". Historians remark the Battle of the Restigouche in June 1760 (one of the final events in the Seven Years' War) in the Baie des Chaleurs, and various other incidents as the colony of Nouvelle France expired.

According to Gamaliel Smethurst, a trader who supposedly was permitted there by Governor Murray, the British attempted to remove the remaining scattered Acadians from the Nepisiguit basin and Caraquet in late October 1761. Following the formal fall of this part of Acadia to British control in 1763 by the Treaty of Paris, the region saw the arrival of numerous English and Scottish settlers, eager to exploit the region's natural resources. Some grants were rewards for good and loyal service with the King's arms: for example, Captain Arthur Goold of the Royal Marines was granted 2,000 acres on both sides of the Nepisiguit River mouth on 9 September 1784 in what is now known as East Bathurst.

=== 1800s ===
One of the Scotsmen was Hugh Munro, who arrived in 1794. By 1800, he was the founder of "the first and most ancient establishment" in the timber trade of Nepisiguit Bay. In 1807 Munro was appointed a justice of the peace and judge of the Inferior Court of Common Pleas for Northumberland County, He was first elected as one of the members of the Legislative Assembly for Northumberland County at the general election of 1820, and maintained that office until the dissolution of that body in 1827. In 1828 he was elected to sit in the 9th New Brunswick Legislature when the county of Gloucester was given its first representative.

It seems that the great 1825 Miramichi Fire had a significant impact on the fortunes of Bathurst, for the devastation of 6,000 acres forced northwards many displaced people. This incident was the reason for the subdivision of two new counties, Kent and Gloucester, out of what had been Northumberland County, and in 1826, St. Peter's harbour was renamed in honour of the Colonial Secretary, Lord Bathurst.

The first St. George's Anglican Church was built in 1825 and consecrated as a place of worship in 1836. The Anglican burial ground near the old post office dates to 1823. The more recent St. George's church, which was built in 1864, on King avenue below St. Andrew Street is a nice example of Carpenter Gothic architecture.

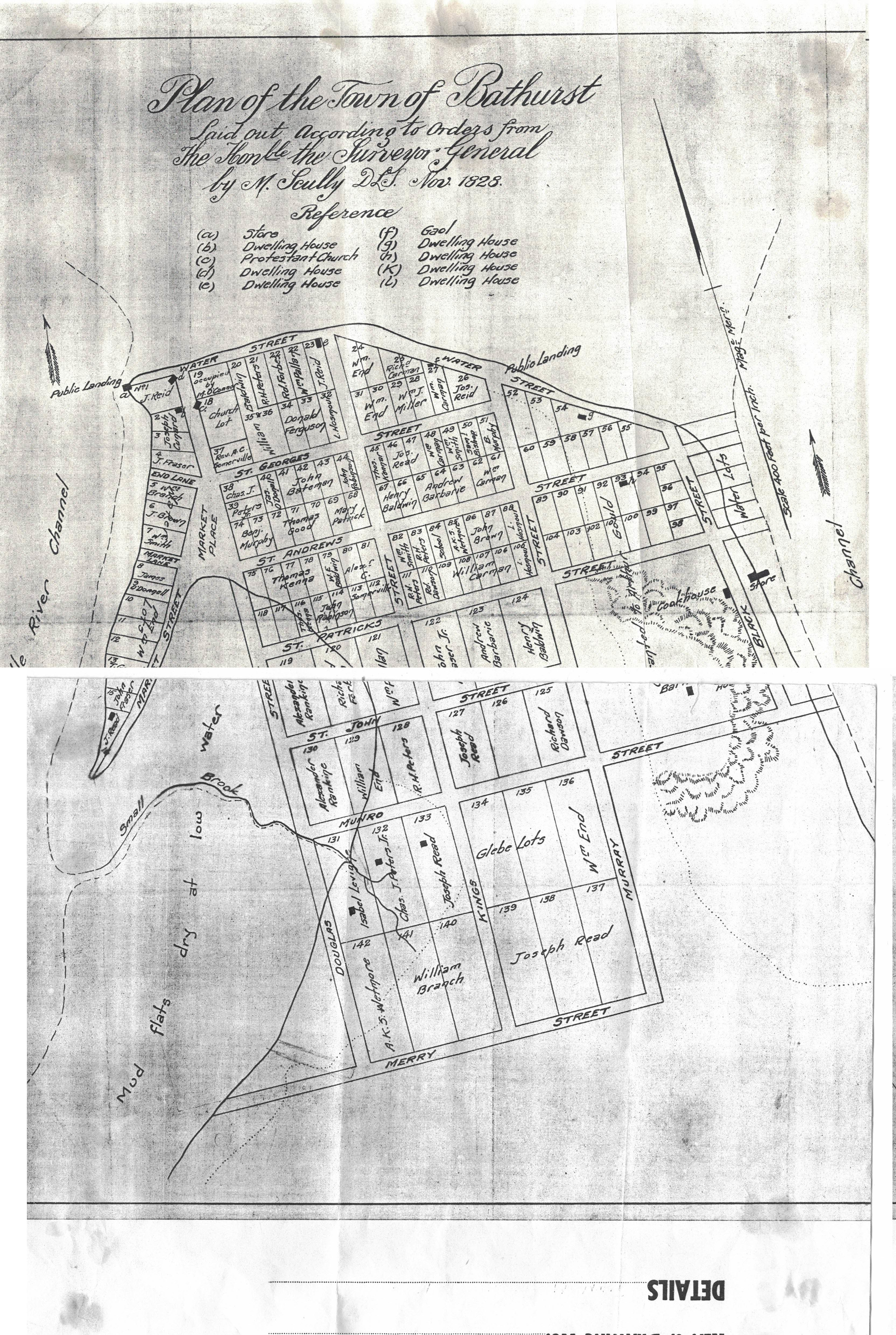
Plan of the Town of Bathurst, New Brunswick as it appeared in November 1828. The Nepisiguit River mouth is off to the right.

The community, which up to 1828 had been named St. Peters, was renamed by the governor, Sir Howard Douglas (1823–1831), in honor of Henry Bathurst, 3rd Earl Bathurst (1762–1834), Secretary of State for the Colonies of the British government.

A man named Cooney wrote in May 1832 that in 1828, Bathurst only contained a few houses, but that four years' hence it had sprouted a brick courthouse roofed with slate, a jail, a post office, a few mercantile establishments, and more than 30 homes. What we now know as Riverside Drive was populated by several Francophone families (who are assumed to be the remnants of Captain MacKenzie's evacuation) and their "neat little Chapel... and two or three rustic windmills", presumably for grinding grain. He estimated the population of Bathurst and its harbor area to be more than 600 souls. Economic activities included farming, lumbering, and fishing.

Joseph Cunard, attracted by the county's timber resources, set up a branch of his family's shipbuilding firm here at some time after the great fire in Miramichi of 1825. By 1828, he was elected to the Legislative Assembly of New Brunswick as representative for Northumberland County, and was variously a justice of the peace and served on the board of health. Joseph's brother Samuel Cunard was also a landowner in Bathurst. Cunard purchased the Gould grant in 1837 and his production of ships in Bathurst harbor began in earnest. The age of timber ships began its decline in 1848 with the 1848 launch of Brunel's SS Great Britain, the revolutionary iron-hulled steamship. This event caused Joseph's shipbuilding firm to founder, and with it went New Brunswick's economy. Samuel went on to manage the Cunard Line. A shipbuilder who followed in Cunard's wake by the name of John O'Brien built more than 60 ships from 1858 to 1877. Ship's carpenters, spar and mast makers, adzemen and other tradesmen were paid up to five dollars per day. It was not unusual during the heyday of Bathurst shipbuilding to see anywhere from five to fifteen ships in various stages of construction along the waterfront.

A stagecoach service between Bathurst and Chatham was launched by James Foran in 1832. Others, like James Waitt, James MacBeath, William Branch and John Rennie soon opened competition.

"Delirium tremens occasioned by the abuse of ardent spirits" caused at least one untimely death in 1831. So it was in 1832 that a Temperance Society was organized in New Bandon, a small town east of Bathurst. Upwards of 50 persons attended.

The first full-time local doctor, Sam Bishop, arrived in 1833; a contemporary of his was known as Robert Gordon. Bishop and Gordon would conduct vaccination clinics throughout the county in 1841 when an epidemic of small pox struck. The third doctor to set up a local practice (but not until 1871) was Gideon Mitchell Duncan.

The Gloucester County Grammar School, later known as the Bathurst Grammar School, opened its doors on 1 October 1835 under the direction of Charles Lloyd. He provided room and board for 24 pounds per annum if the student was under 10 years of age; older students were charged two pounds more. At least two private schools were active elsewhere in the county during the same era.

The town map of 1836 shows "public landing" government docks at the water end of the four downtown streets, Douglas, King, Murray, and Black (now Main), as well as the western end of Water (now Main) Street. The town extends as far south as Munro Street; glebe lots were located between King and Murray, south of Munro.

In the mid-19th century Gloucester County, settlers who petitioned the province for 50 or 100-acre parcels of land were required in order to obtain their grant: to homestead this land for three years, that is, to build a house on it and eventually to cultivate four acres on it.

Charles Lanman wrote in 1856 of fly fishing for salmon in the Nepisiguit that "It has not its superior in the world. It is a marvelous river." The hire in that era of a river guide with expert local knowledge cost one dollar a day. For this sum, the employers would be transported with their bags to the salmon pools, would have their meals cooked for them, flies tied for them, rods repaired for them, and clothes washed for them. Presumably, their tents would be pitched for them as well.

Samuel Napier, who had grown up in Bathurst, discovered on 14 August 1857 the 145-pound gold "Napier Nugget" somewhere in the Australian state of Victoria. He later represented Gloucester County in the Legislative Assembly of New Brunswick from 1870 to 1874, replacing shipbuilder John Meahan.

The estimated population of the Parish of Bathurst in 1847, the year before the bankruptcy of Joseph Cunard, was 2,605. By 1871 it had apparently shrunk to 600.

One report from 1851 states that 2,000 tons of hay; 3,500 bushels of wheat; 1,500 bushels of barley; 16,700 bushels of oats, 700 bushels of buckwheat; and 10 bushels of Indian corn were produced in the area.

It appears that electors from Bathurst and the wider Gloucester County were not in favour of Confederation. Residents of a harbour that in addition thrived as a shipbuilding center could see little advantage in tying themselves to the anchor that was at the time the United Provinces of Canada. They were instead focused on trade with the United Kingdom and its Atlantic colonies, in addition to any nation which had an Atlantic seaport, including especially the American seaboard states; shipments of lumber, deals or laths were common enough to Manhattan NY.

In the 19th century, men were eager to fell trees in the forest around Bathurst all winter long from sunup to sundown (Sundays excepted) for eight to ten dollars a month. Timber camps typically housed 50 men, who were each employed in one of several job descriptions. The telephone was but a distant dream, and weekends were spent at the camp. Spare time was kept to a minimum, but fiddlers and other musicians developed nonetheless by dint of isolation.

The population of the Parish of Bathurst in 1861 was 3,771 souls, of whom 292 were farmers, and 1,071 were children between the ages of six and sixteen. Eighty years before the introduction of mandatory attendance, only 483 of these attended school. Agriculture was the primary occupation of the denizens, and potatoes were the crop of choice. There were one hydraulic grist mill, and one saw mill. The Anglican faith counted 569 devotees, the Presbyterian 573, the Methodist 241, and the Roman Catholic 2,371.

The Annual Report of the Department of Fisheries for 1868 lists a so-called "Marine Hospital" in Bathurst, and the place of work for a Fisheries Officer. Bathurst once had a fish processing plant. Navigation in this County consisted of the carrying of wood, fish and grindstones from Bathurst to Britain, ports of the Dominion, Newfoundland, Miquelon, the United States, South America and Italy. In the wood trade, Bathurst employed in 1868 vessels of from 50 to 1,200 tons. The beacons at that time were unlit, a cause of some concern.

In 1871 Bathurst had a population of 600.

On 14 December 1872, Justice William End was assassinated, likely by a ruffian whom he had earlier jailed for four months. The suspect left Bathurst soon afterwards and was never apprehended.

Bathurst Grammar School became graded in 1874.

Hollywood film actor Sam de Grasse was born here in 1875.

The opening of the Intercolonial Railway of Canada in 1876 (shown at the left hand side in the Ganong map) provided a fast connection from the port of Bathurst to the rest of North America which was essential for developing the region's principal industries in forestry and zinc mining. For example, the St. Lawrence Lumber Co., which is depicted in the Ganong map at the mouth of the Nepisiguit River, was managed in the late 19th century by Kennedy Francis Burns of Miramichi.

W.J. Kent opened his eponymous department store in 1884 on Main Street.

In 1886, after a fire had destroyed its Temperance Hall, the Roman Catholic Church began construction of what is now known as the Sacré-Coeur Cathedral. The diocese of Chatham was removed to Bathurst in 1938, and what had been up til then a church now became a cathedral.

=== 1900s ===
Even as late as 1900, the Sacred Heart Academy had outdoor toilets; modern water facilities from Carter's Brook to a 200 ft AMSL tank on Murray Avenue were provided to the newly formed Town only after August 1916; a sewer system was installed at the same time, although the date of sanitary service installation at the Academy is unknown.

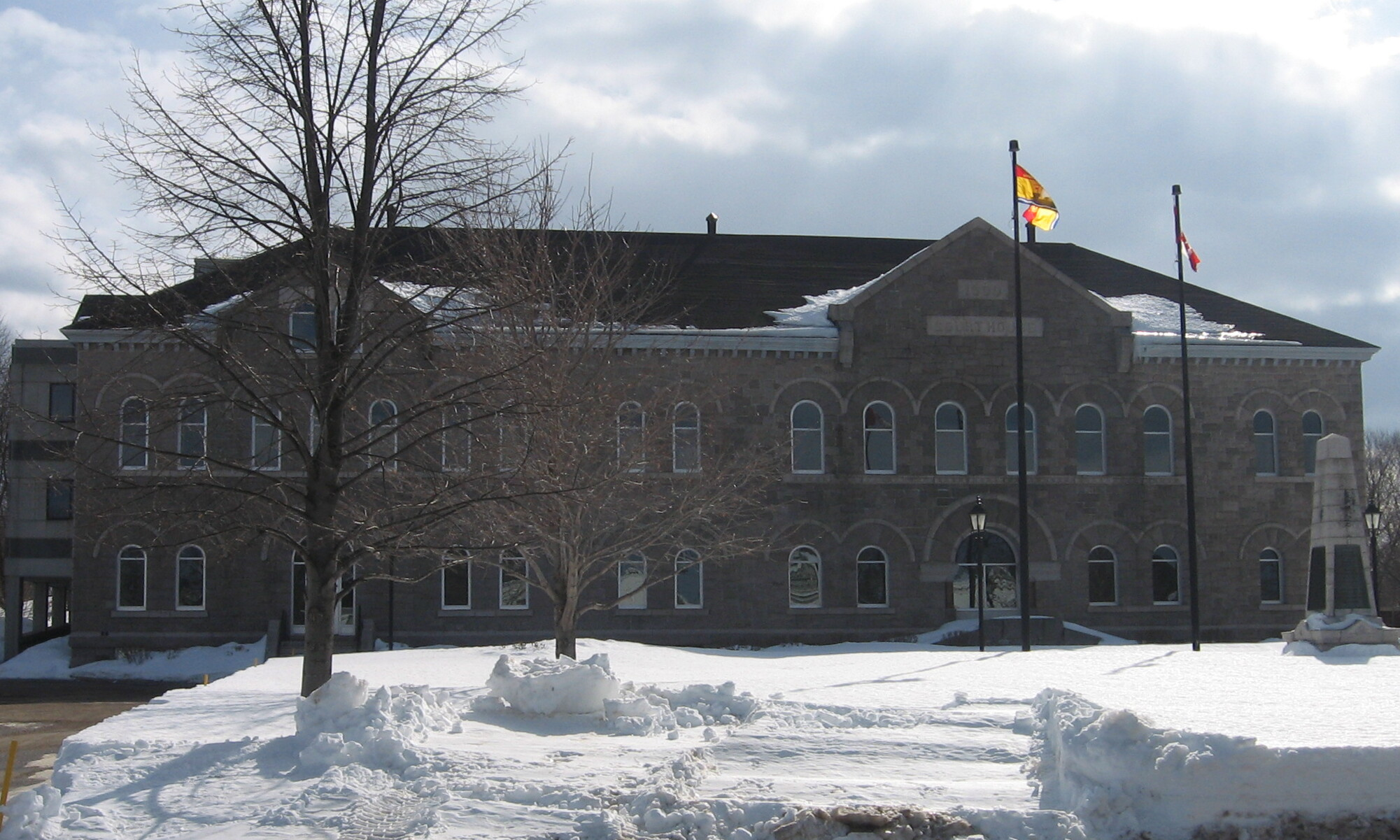
The county courthouse at Bathurst.

The imposing county courthouse and jail at St. Patrick Street—built from the same Connolly (Nepisiquit) quarry granite as other official buildings of the period—dates from 1900. This replaced an earlier, and more modest, wood-frame building. The jail function has been decommissioned for some years, in favour of the provincial facility at Dalhousie.

The Town of Bathurst, 1860

In 1904 Bathurst was a seaport, a port of entry on the Intercolonial Railway and the Caraquet and Gulf Shore Railway and a town with a post office, 35 stores, six hotels, a steam sawmill, a shingle mill, a flour mill, three fish freezers, two carriage factories, a printing shop, three churches and a population of 3,000. A boy of fifteen, fresh out of school, could earn $18.00 per month "to work in the woods". That year, John P. Leger formed a private venture called the Bathurst Electric and Water Power Company, with aim to erect and operate at Tetagouche River Falls a hydro-electric plant. Electricity had arrived in Bathurst, twenty-two years after the Pearl Street Station had illuminated New York.

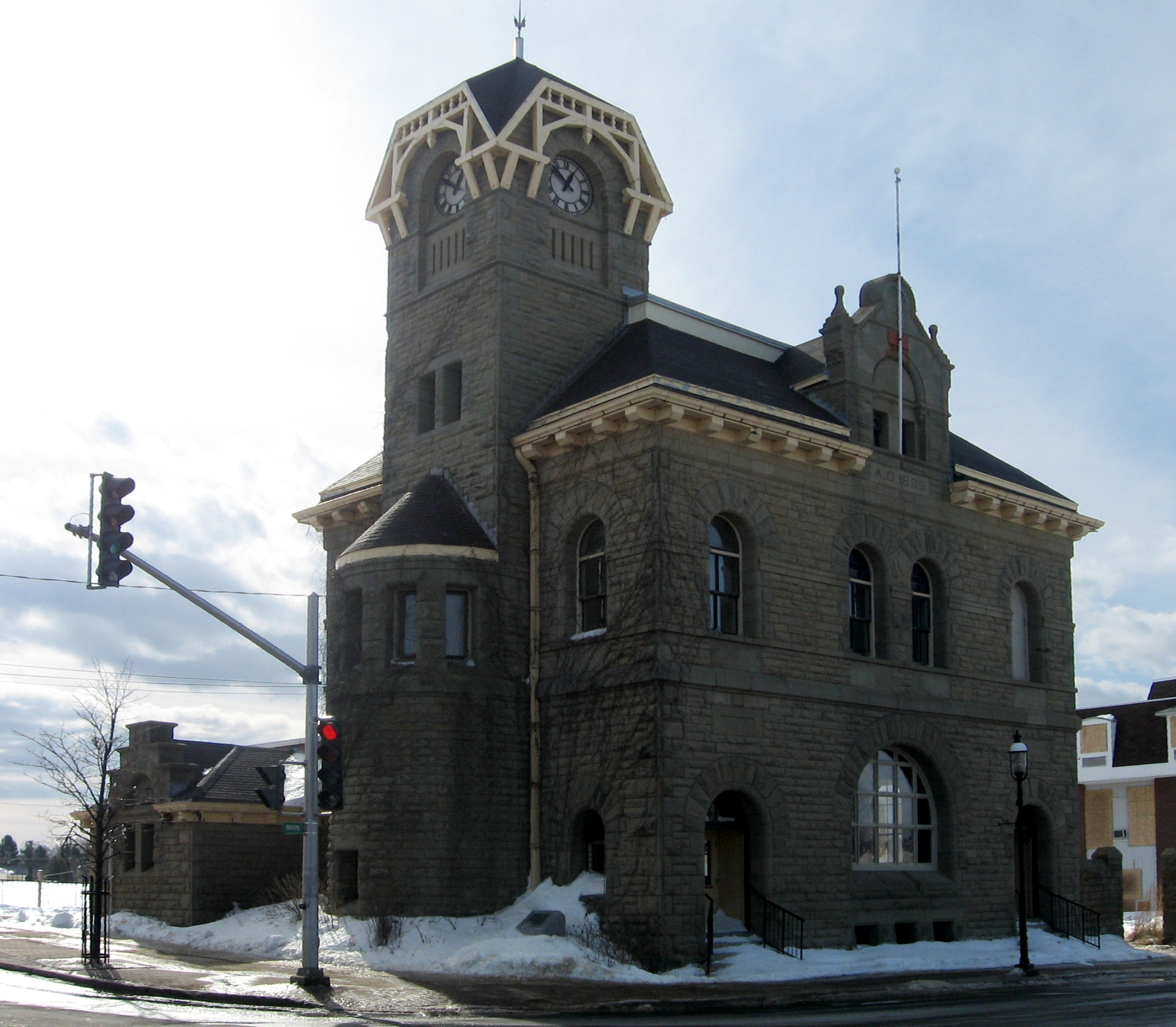
Bathurst's former post office and customs house, designed in 1884 by Thomas Fuller

The Northern New Brunswick and Seaboard Railway can lay claim to be the railway company with the fewest miles of standard gauge track in history. The province empowered it in 1904 to lay track between Nepisiguit Junction and Grand Falls, a distance of 16 miles, to serve the short-lived Drummond Iron Mines. It would serve, for several years from 1920, to ferry construction materials to the (Nepisiguit) Grand Falls hydroelectric power dam.

The Annie R. plied her trade between Bathurst, Carron Point and Youghall Beach early in the 20th century (before private motorized transport became the norm) under the command of Jack Stever. The return fare from Bathurst to either of the points was a quarter. She was equipped with a steam boiler, was 36 feet long with a beam of eight feet and built in Bathurst. Owned by John Rennie, then foreman of the Caraquet Railway, the boat was built in George Eddy's mill by Joe Stackhouse of Saint John while he was engaged in the construction of the Nepisiguit Lumber Co. sawmill.

In 1911, James Hamet Dunn, who was born in West Bathurst in 1874, returned to Bathurst to endow its first hospital, on the Riverside Drive grounds of what was once a Doctor's office. It burned to the ground in 1917, and an expanded 35-bed structure was rebuilt in its place. The hospital eventually would grow to 60 bed capacity, and house a school of nursing. Damaged by fire in January 1951, the Dunn Hospital would pass into collective memory.

Bathurst was incorporated as a town in 1912, following a poll of ratepayers and property holders conducted on 30 May that year in which a majority vote of 195 to 54 determined the outcome. The first election occurred on 11 September, and the budget for the first year was fixed at $8 million. The town of Bathurst's first mayor was Patrick J. Burns, who has a street (along Coronation Park) named after him.

The civic expansion happened just prior to the closure in 1913 of the decade-old Drummond Mines Limited iron mine at the Bathurst Mining Camp. The arrival of water and sewer service to individual residences occurred in 1915, too late for the blaze on 28 April 1914 that consumed 35 buildings. Most of downtown was a blackened disaster zone. The Drummond Mine property was eventually acquired by the Dominion Steel and Coal Company, who operated it more successfully.

The Bathurst Power and Paper Company Ltd. built a mill in Bathurst, New Brunswick in 1914. Majority control of the company was obtained in the late 1930s by Arthur J. Nesbitt and his partner Peter A. T. Thomson through their holding company, Power Corporation of Canada. In the early 1960s, Power Corporation bought the Consolidated Paper Company. When Paul Desmarais acquired control of Power Corporation in 1968, the two companies were merged to become Consolidated-Bathurst Inc. By far the largest private employer in the city for many years, Consolidated-Bathurst in 1977 employed 586 people. In 1989, the company was sold to Stone Container Corporation of Chicago, Illinois who renamed it Stone Consolidated Inc.

Herman Good, by then a corporal in the Royal Highlanders, earned a Victoria Cross in the Battle of Amiens on 8 August 1918.

A man employed by the Bathurst Company Limited to saw shingles could earn $1 an hour during the 1920s. By the height of the depression in 1933 a project to pave Main Street paid the same worker $2 a day.

Peter Veniot, the owner since 1891 of Bathurst's French-language newspaper was the first Acadian premier of the province of New Brunswick. He succeeded upon resignation Walter Foster as Premier in 1923, after a varied career in provincial government and as a civil servant. As Minister of Public Works in the Foster cabinet, Veniot was responsible for the creation of the New Brunswick Electric Power Commission, latterly NB Power. He was a supporter of the Maritime Rights Movement, which advocated more power for the Maritime provinces in Canadian confederation. His government was defeated in the 1925 provincial election, and he went on to become a Minister in the cabinet of Mackenzie King. All that remains of the newspaper which for a time he owned—the Courier des Provinces Maritimes—is a nameplate on its building at 174 St. Andrew Street, which was latterly converted to a rooming house.

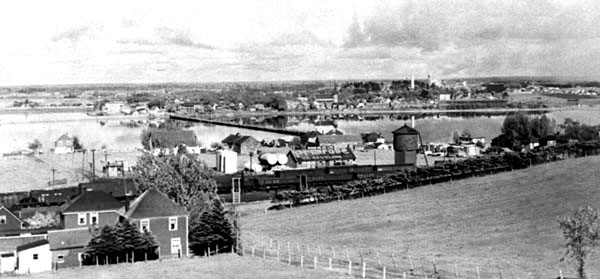
1930s bird's eye view of Bathurst, likely taken from College Sacre-Coeur. Looking east at railway in foreground, harbour and city in background.

In 1921 the College Sacre-Coeur, a Roman Catholic residential high school for Acadians, was relocated to Bathurst from its previous home in Caraquet. The anglophone Bathurst High School was founded in 1926, with the closure of the Grammar School which had outgrown its premises on St. Andrew Street.

Bathurst Harbour was a busy place early in the Twentieth century. One might find schooners or ships in port, likely as not to board grindstones from the Reid firm, or milled lumber. Tugboats were employed to haul quarried limestone, or timber, which floated behind them between booms, from the Gaspé Peninsula. A steel tug, the Ste. Anne, in one trip could haul as many as 6,000 cords to its home at the pulp mill. She measured 135 feet with a beam of 29 feet and a draft of 16 feet making 465 tons. She was powered by a 1,200 horsepower coal-fired steam engine. The Francis Huntley, a wooden tug, was owned by a partnership between the Gloucester Lumber Company and White & Rogers Co, and was used to boom timber from the mouth of the Bass River to a mill at White's Wharf.

A sanatorium for the care of tuberculosis patients was opened in May 1931. Named Our Lady of Lourdes of the Lady Dunn Institution, it was endowed by Sir James Dunn (as he then was called) and his wife. It was entrusted by deed to the Religious Hospitallers of St. Joseph, and located at Vallee Lourdes just north of the town on a 1,000 acre farm which today houses the Chaleur Regional Hospital.

The village bridge, which was badly in need of repair, was reconstructed at the height of Great Depression by the province.

Sail power was employed for commercial purposes even as late as the 1930s for shipments whose origin was Bathurst, such as lumber.

On 27 September 1943, German spy Wolfgang Heyda, who had been interned in Bowmanville, Ontario, evaded capture in Montreal and Bathurst, but finally was caught in Grande-Anse. He had been scheduled to rendez-vous at the Maisonette lighthouse with a German U-boat, but the plan was foiled by the military, whose intelligence services had alerted them to the German plan. In the end, the U-boat got away.

For several years during the 1940s, Bathurst was home to Louis Robichaud, while he studied at the College Sacre-Coeur, in order to study for the Juvénat Saint-Jean-Eudes. He demurred from the priestly vocation and, after a period at Laval University, instead studied law by correspondence at UNB while he articled at a Bathurst law firm. He met the woman who later became his wife in 1950 here at a wedding.

Princess Elizabeth, as she then was, visited Bathurst on her cross-Canada tour in 1951. The same year saw the installation of an artificial ice surface at the hockey barn near the paper mill: a levy was voted for this purpose at the special meeting of Town Council on 11 September, which followed a plebiscite on the issue.

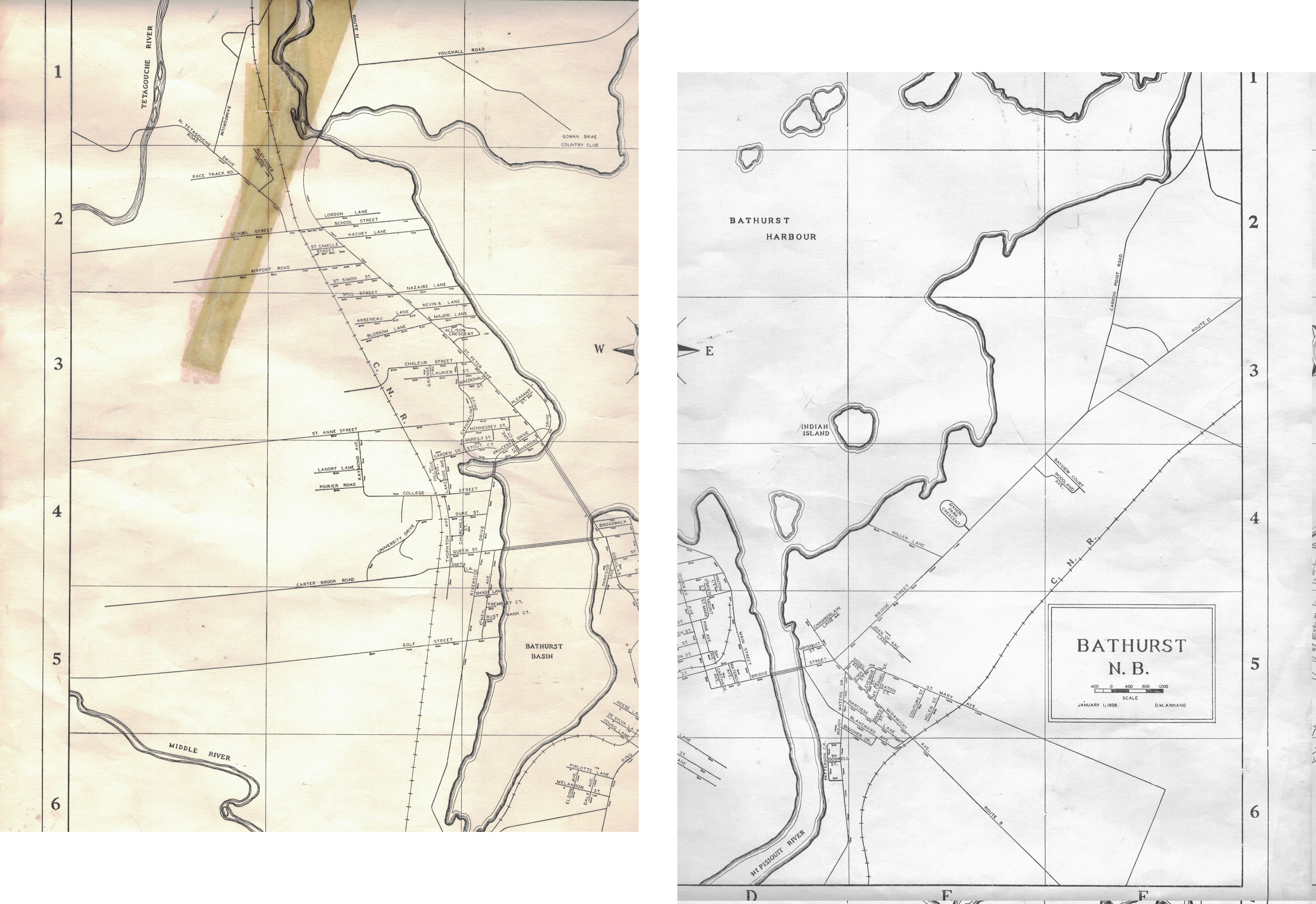
Plan of the Town and Region of Bathurst, New Brunswick in 1958.

In April 1954, a new 80-foot antenna broadcast CHSJ signals to Bathurst from New Brunswick's only television station in Saint John. From 1958 onwards, the francophone CHAU station would broadcast on Channel 5 from its transmitter on Mount St. Joseph near Carleton, Quebec. Radio came to Bathurst in 1955, on CKBC run by the Bathurst Broadcasting Company.

Sacred Heart University awarded "local boy made good" Sir James Dunn an honorary Social Science doctorate in May 1954. The institution had been granted the power to confer degrees by a 1940 Act of Parliament, which lasted until in 1974 the Board of Directors transferred control to the provincial government of Richard Bennett Hatfield, and it became known as the Bathurst Community College. Immature students and malcontented professors had in effect forced this change on the Board.

The fill for the Queen street causeway was obtained from the excavations of the lower reservoir. The Town of Bathurst provided one third of the funds, while the government of Hugh John Fleming provided the other two thirds. The project, which begun in 1955, took two years to complete.

Edward Byrne, KC, who had been Mayor of Bathurst from April 1949 to April 1951, was asked to chair the Royal Commission on Finance and Municipal Taxation in New Brunswick in 1960 by Robichaud, who then was Premier. He completed his report on November 4, 1963, and Robichaud later used his work to justify monumental changes in how the province is run.

A petition was presented to the provincial government on 15 March 1960 to request the transformation of the town into a city, after an affirmative vote was produced by ratepayers within the town and outlying districts.

CN rail fares, 1966
Year	Pop.
Halifax	$7.40
Saint John	$5.00
Montreal	$11.00
Toronto	$15.50
Winnipeg	$30.00
Vancouver	$53.00
Source: 2016 Northern Light calendar

Construction of the present airport near South Tetagouche was begun in 1964 as a project funded by the Town of Bathurst and Gloucester county municipalities. Lights were installed along the 4,000 by 75 foot paved runway in 1968. Bathurst was meanwhile incorporated as a city, the province's sixth, in 1966; hunters were dismayed because the increased size of the city meant, ipso facto, that they were expropriated.

In 1972, the Bathurst Alpine Papermakers won the Hardy Cup, defeating The Rosetown Red Wings 3–0 at the old Bathurst Arena. The Hardy cup was the Canadian national Intermediate "A" ice hockey championship from 1967 until 1984.

The area of the City in 1978 was 23,150 acres (9,370 ha), while the taxable area was 15,600 acres (6,300 ha); the city counted 154 people as employees. The mill rate was 1.0123, the number of water meters was 2,480, and the population was 16,301. The city in 1978 had about 178,000 feet (54,000 m) of pipe in its water network. Storm and sanitary sewers were, at the time, combined in some areas. Septic tanks were, and are still, used in some outlying areas.

In 1998, the decrepit 1920s-vintage hockey barn near the pulp mill was torn down, and replaced by a modern facility named the K. C. Irving Centre. Laval Titan QMJHL franchise relocated to Bathurst, taking the name Acadie–Bathurst Titan.

=== 2000s ===
The Nepisiguit Centennial Museum/Cultural Centre (established 1967) was designated in October 2005 a local historic place under the provincial Community Planning Act. The Herman J. Good V.C Branch No.18 Royal Canadian Legion War Museum (established 1956) was designated in December 2005 a local historic place.

On the evening of 27 March 2015, the Munro St. home of the Bathurst Agricultural Society—which had celebrated its 125th anniversary the previous year—was destroyed by fire. The society had been formed on 3 May 1853 to assist farmers by providing education, seeds and purebred livestock, and in as of 2014 sold a variety of agricultural-related products including livestock feed. The Bathurst Farmer's Market, which had been housed in the same building, eventually moved to near the old Post Office building on Main St. The Society was quickly re-housed in the former location of Save Easy on Rough Waters Drive.

On the evening of 27 November 2015, a fire destroyed four historic commercial buildings at the corner of Main Street and King Avenue. Fifty people in apartments above the stores lost everything and prominent office space was destroyed, including buildings that housed Birds Eye View pet store, Au Cafe Gourmet, local fabric store Christie's, the old stone-faced Bank of Montreal, and a wine bar. All the animals in the pet store perished, and electricity service was temporarily suspended to about 450 NB Power customers in the area. Mayor Stephen Brunet said it was a busy and successful corner: "Every building was part of the history of downtown and there for many, many years. It's going to be a big hole in downtown." The previous week, an abandoned building down the street on King Avenue was destroyed by fire, causing Mayor Brunet concerns. The Downtown Bathurst Revitalization Corporation and the local chapter of the Canadian Red Cross were active in the efforts to support the afflicted. The fire was believed to have started at the back of the pet shop. On 5 August 2016, 53-year-old Perry Kinsman was arrested and charged with one count of arson after over nine months of investigation.

On January 1, 2023, Bathurst annexed parts of the local service districts of the parish of Bathurst, Big River, New Bandon-Salmon Beach, (Note: Properties along Currie Street, most of which don't have street numbers. The white paper proposing the 2023 governance changes based its percentage figures on the population of LSDs rather than their land area, which implies that the NB-SB area was omitted from the boundary description because the area has no permanent residents.) and North Tetagouche. The names of communities in the annexed areas remain in use for address purposes.

== Economy ==
The Bathurst Mining Camp provided for almost 50 years a lot of jobs to the regional economy. The Brunswick Mine facility closed in April 2013. Unemployment hit over 20% in northern New Brunswick in March 2013 as a result.

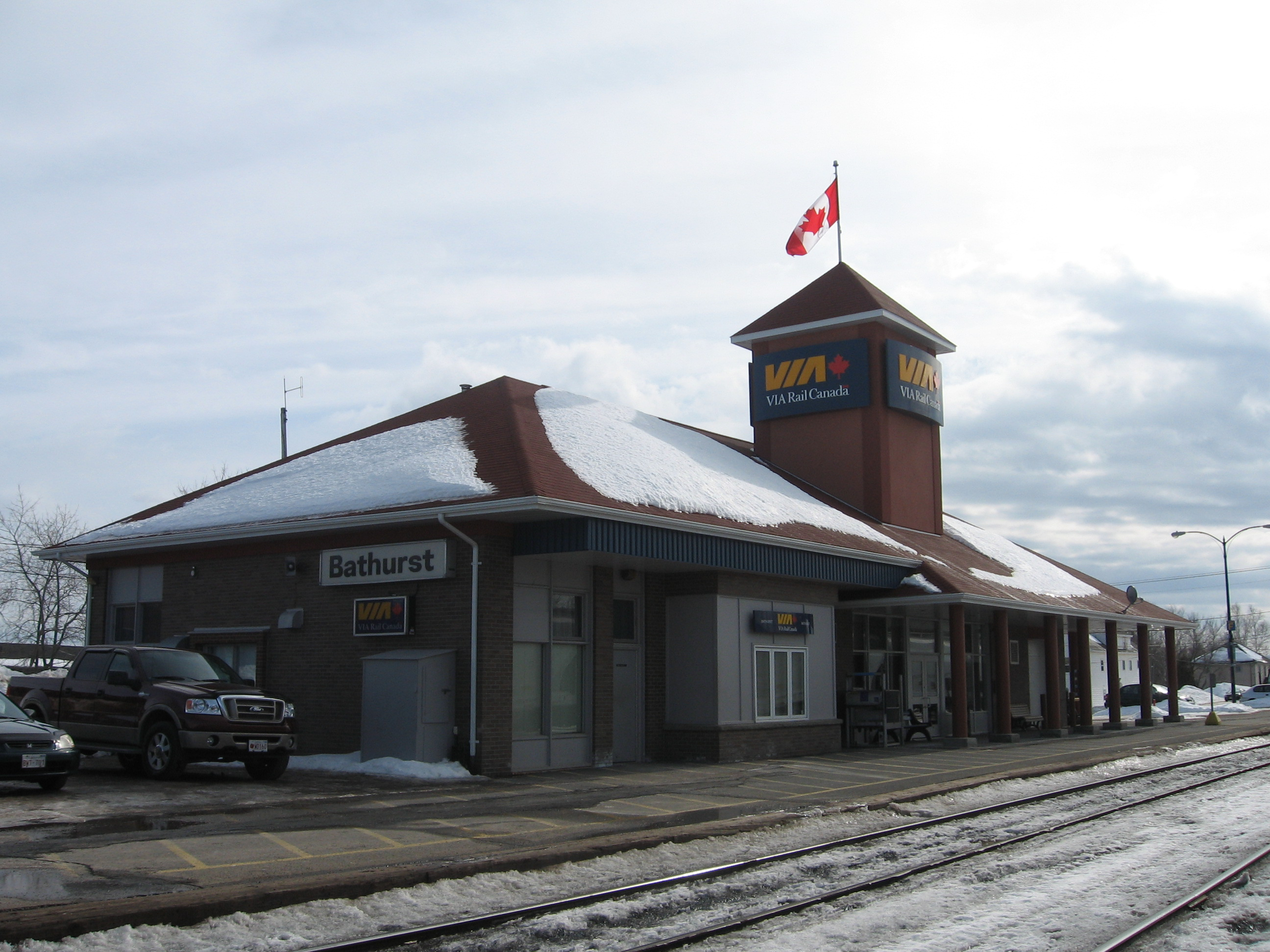
Bathurst station

Bathurst is located, and has a station, on the Canadian National railway line. Via Rail provides a Wednesday, Friday and Sunday passenger service in both directions. The economy is primarily focused on mining, fishing and forestry. Other sectors include: tourism, phone call centres, manufacturing, and provincial and federal government. The service sector is the city's largest employer. The city is serviced by one health care facility, Chaleur Regional Hospital.

A regional Tax Services Canada and a Transport Canada Marine Safety Service centre are in the old downtown. Bathurst Marina is listed as an official Port of Entry for small vessels. It is listed as a non-compulsory pilotage zone. The port authority was transferred in February 2003 to a private consortium, after which on 21 September 2006 the port was delisted from the Canada Marine Act along with other ports on the North Shore of the province which by then had fallen into disuse. Bathurst is located 50 km (31 mi) south of the deep-water Port of Belledune, where a petroleum tank farm and a coal-fired electrical generating station are located.

On December 17, 2010, it was determined that an environmental assessment was required in relation to an expansion of a sawmill project because the Atlantic Canada Opportunities Agency considered providing financial assistance to the proponent. The project consists of building an expansion of approximately 297 square meters (m2) that will be added to the existing building of approximately 372 m2.

Bathurst Airport accommodates general aviation.

The Smurfit-Stone paper mill (formerly part of the Power Corporation of Canada empire) ceased operations in 2009, and the plant is in process of being demolished. The 225ac of industrial wasteland was sold on in January 2010 to the Green Investment Group partners. Their goal is to create innovative, alternative energy projects that enhance the Bathurst region and Northern New Brunswick. The plan anticipates attracting companies that utilize technologies focusing on energy generation, alternative fuels and waste-to-energy conversion. The property was as of July 2015 in violation of the city's dangerous and unsightly premises bylaw, but the owner is located outside the country, and was unwilling to deal with the property despite being given final notice by the city. There were almost $1 million in back taxes and environmental reclamation costs associated with the former mill site as of July 2015. The provincial Department of Environment and Local Government Minister, Brian Kenny, issued a ministerial order, which required the company to clean up the site within 120 days, but the deadline passed on 14 August, so the file was passed on to the Attorney-General in order to determine whether charges would be laid.

GDF Suez operates the inland Caribou Wind Park energy farm approximately 70 km (43 mi) west of Bathurst under a power purchase agreement scheme contracted with NB Power, with a nominal power output of 100MW.

== Sports ==
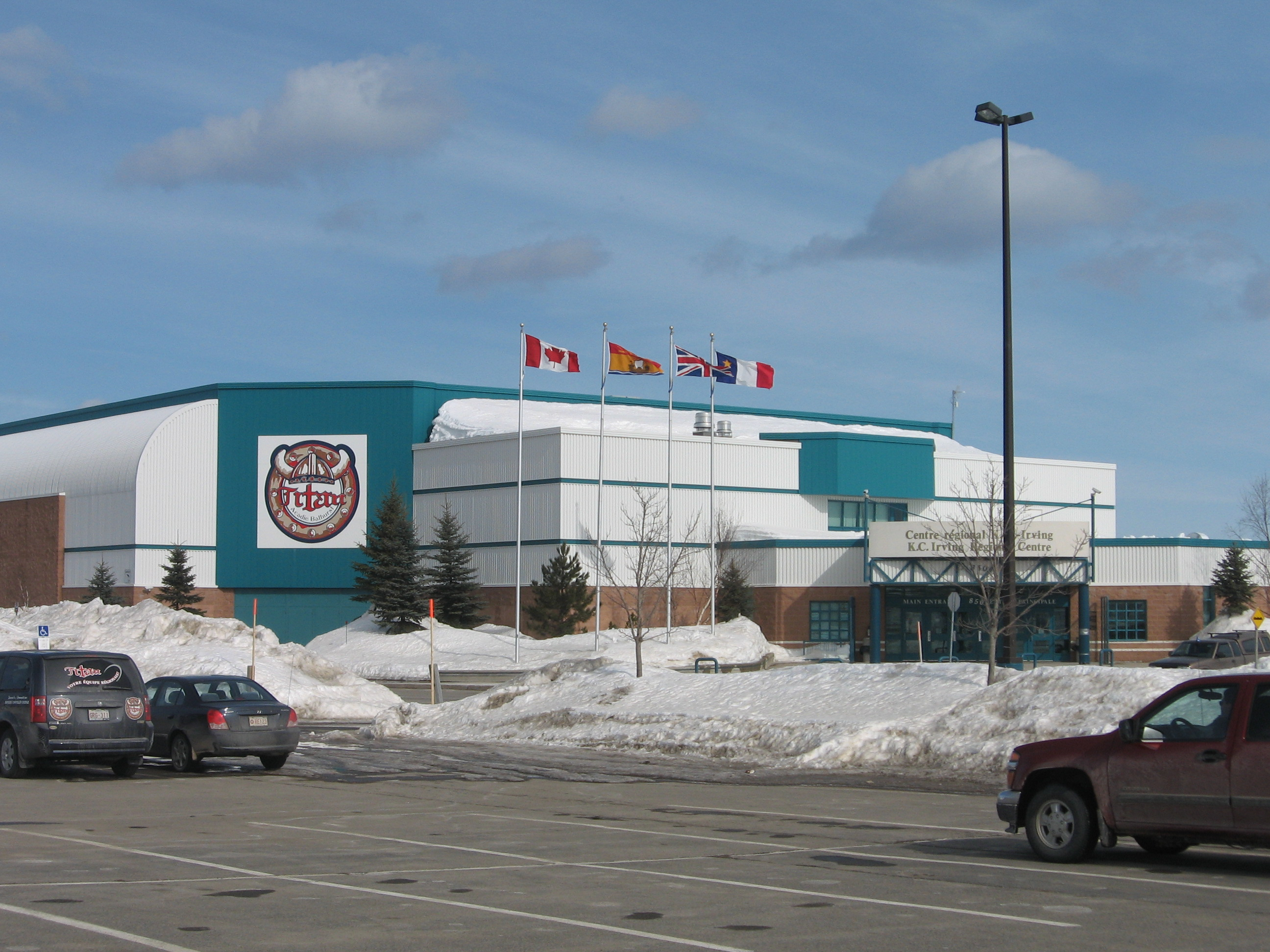
K. C. Irving Regional Centre is home to the Chaleur Lightning of the Maritime Junior Hockey League (MHL)

Bathurst has several community and competitive sports organizations, along with outdoor recreation facilities across the city. Residents have access to playing fields, tennis and basketball courts, recreational trails, and public skating at local rinks. The K. C. Irving Regional Centre is the main arena and events venue and posts public/senior skating schedules throughout the season. In 2023 the City launched a 10-year Parks & Recreation Master Plan to guide parks, trails, facilities and programs.

Bathurst supports amateur and semi-professional teams in hockey and basketball.

Notable sports teams in the city include:

- The Chaleur Lightning of the Maritime Junior Hockey League (MHL).
- The Acadie–Bathurst Titan of the Quebec Maritimes Junior Hockey League, based at the K. C. Irving Regional Centre from 1998 to 2025. The team won the Memorial Cup in 2018.
- The Bathurst Bears of the Eastern Canadian Basketball League.
- The historic Bathurst Alpine Papermakers, who won the national Hardy Cup in 1972.

Recreation amenities include baseball diamonds, soccer fields, beaches, and public parks throughout the city and waterfront.

== Notable people ==
The BBC's chief international news correspondent Lyse Doucet and her sister, the sociologist Andrea Doucet, are natives of Bathurst. Sir James Dunn, of Algoma Steel and Canada Steamship Lines fame, was born in West Bathurst.

== Gallery ==
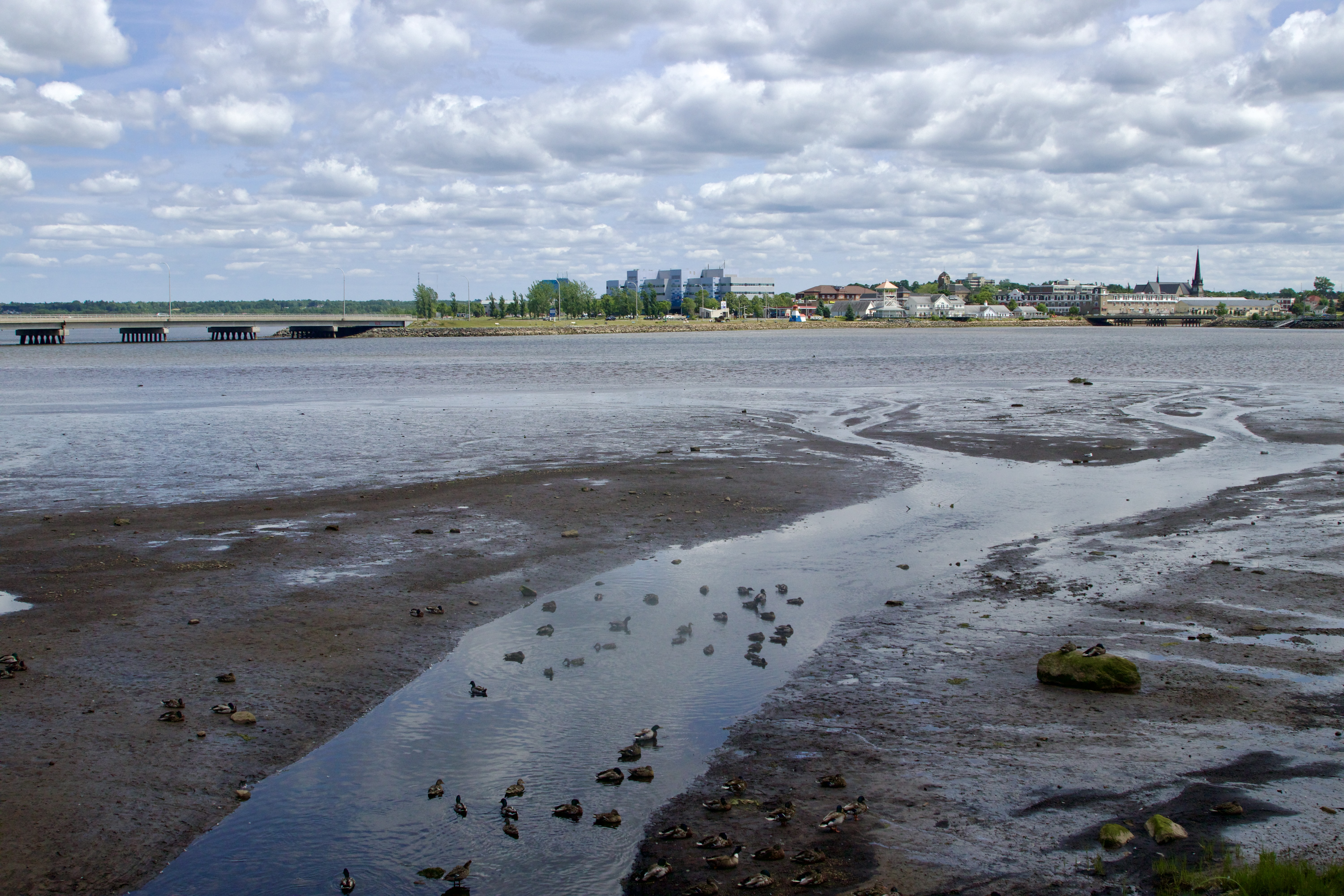
Harbour view with ducks

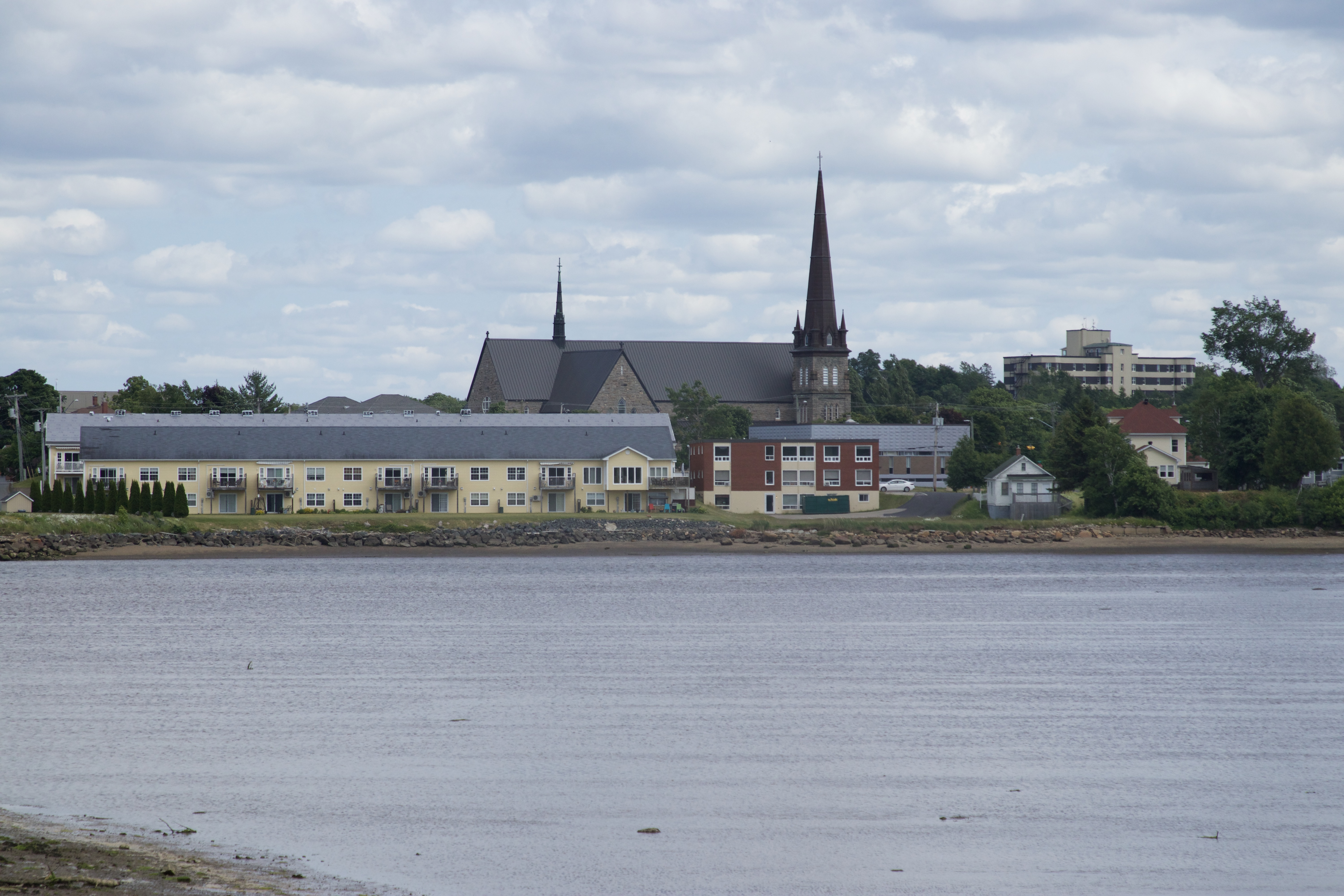
View of church across the harbour

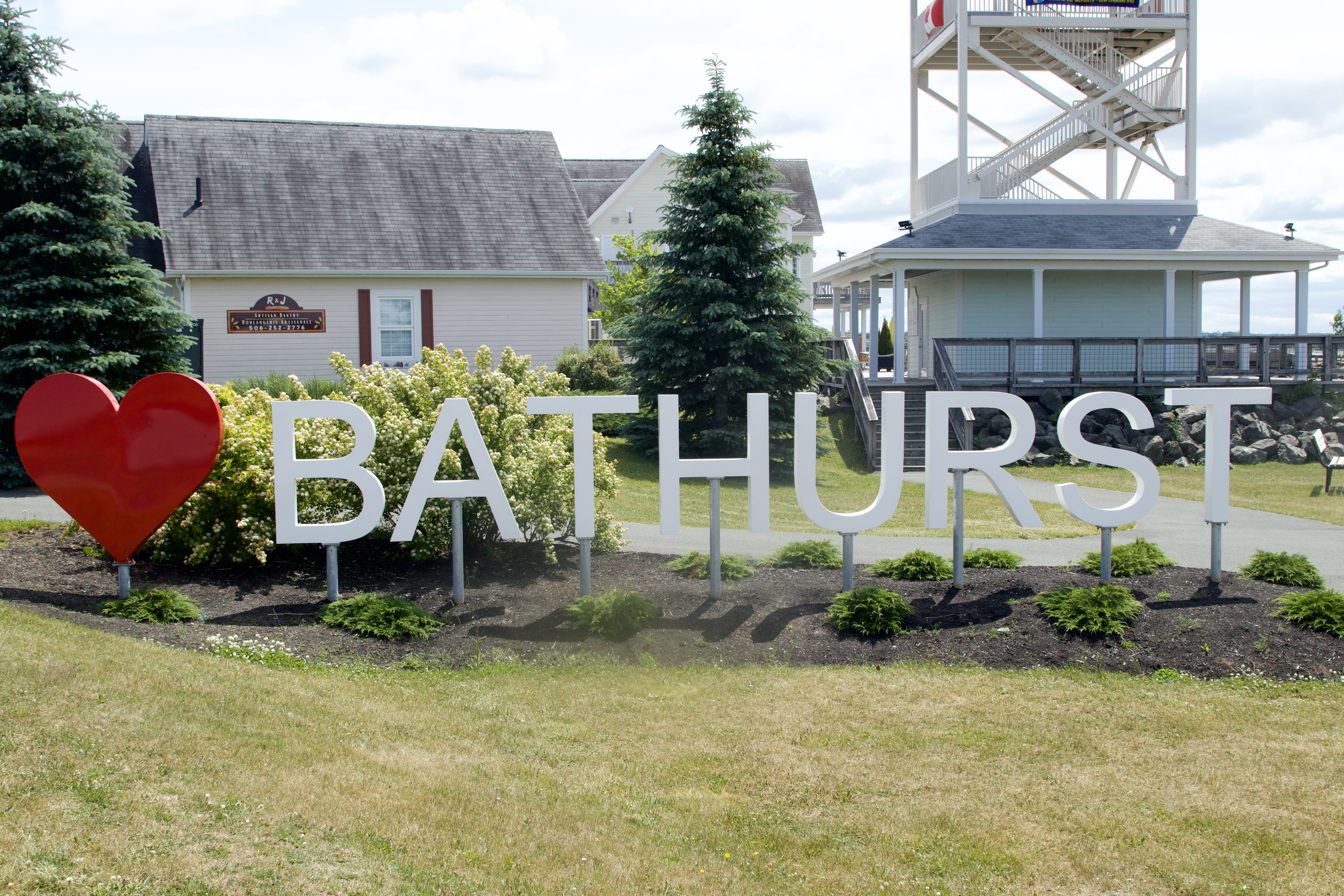
Tourist sign

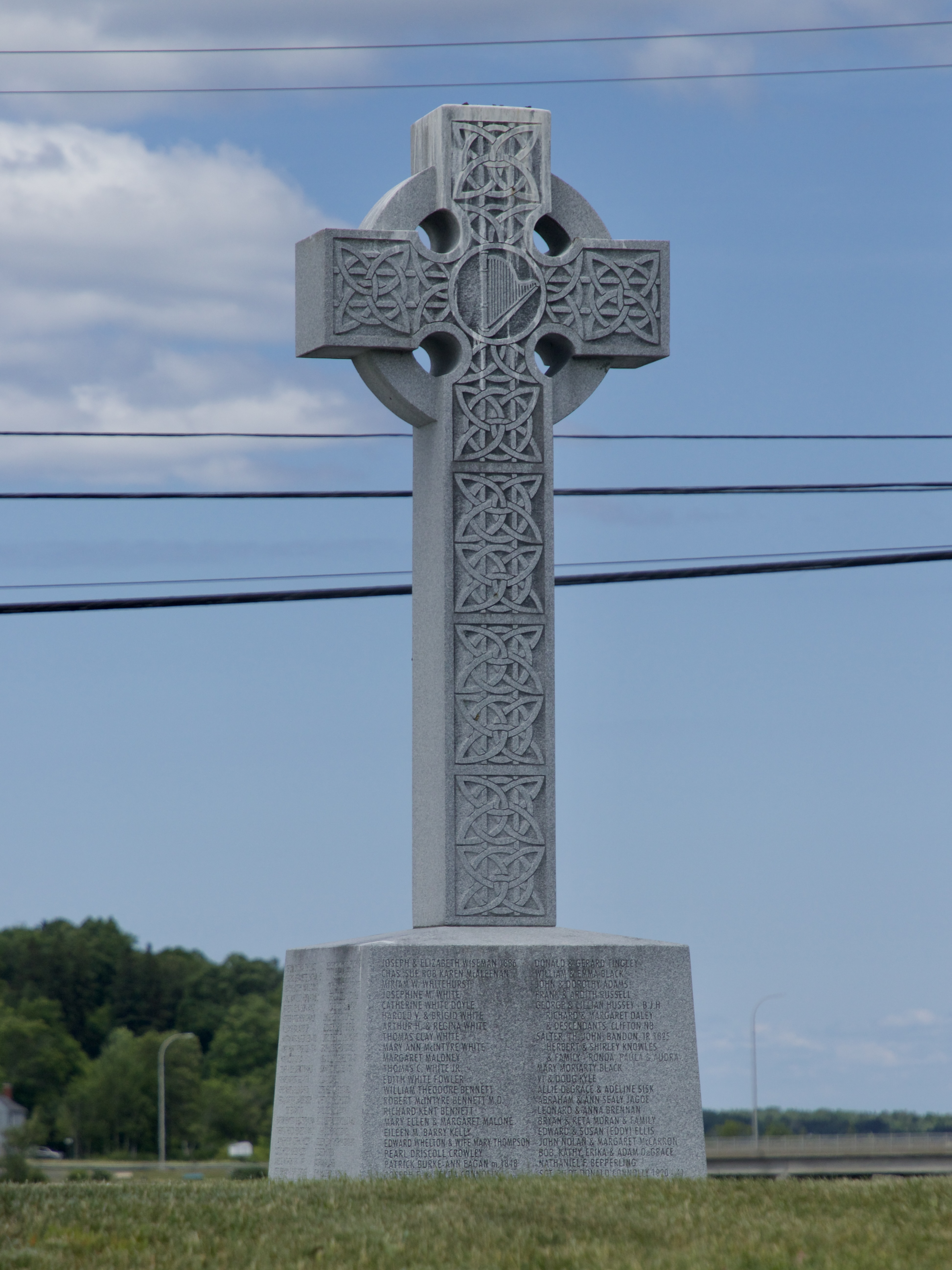
Celtic cross in Richelieu Park

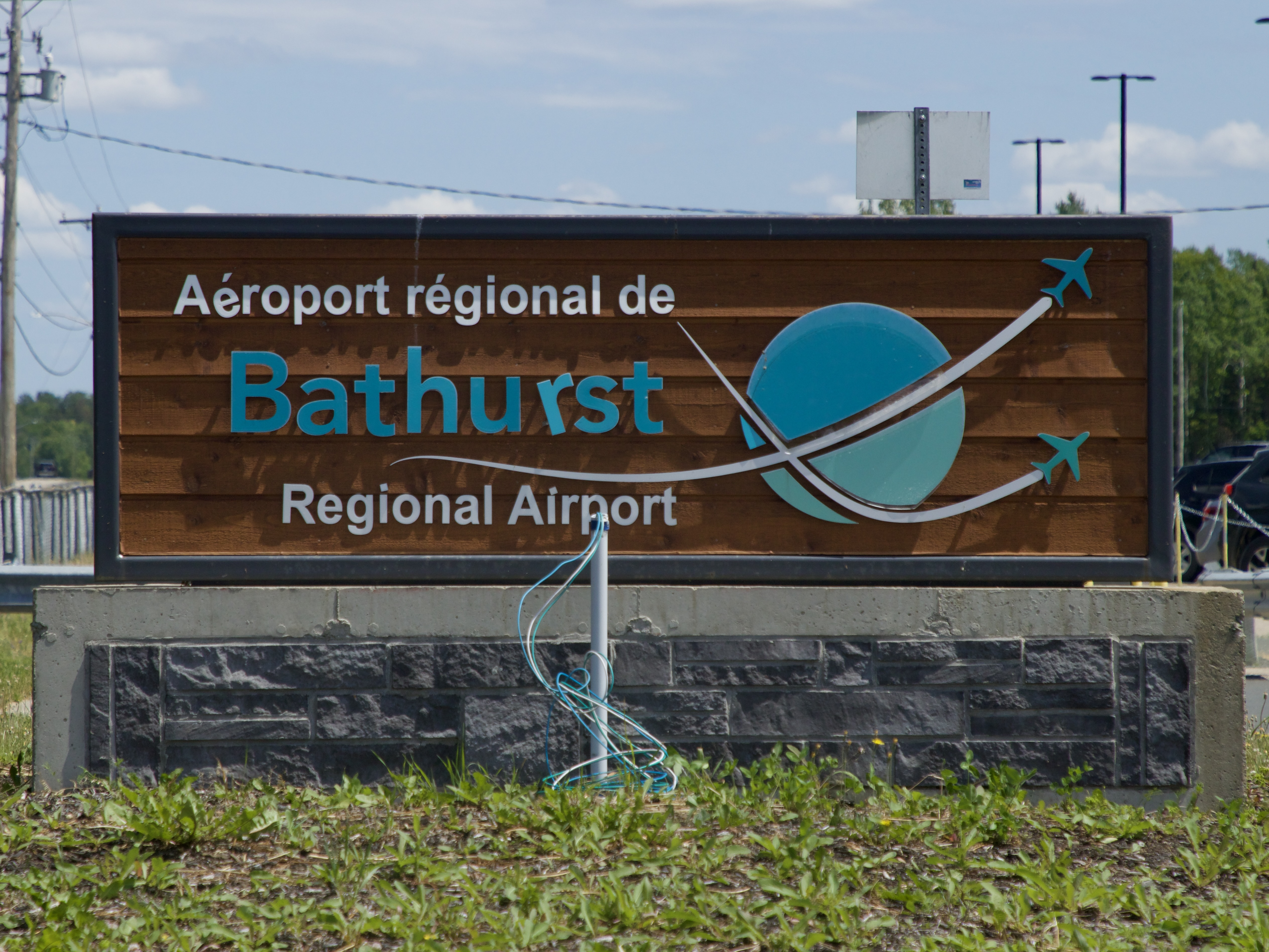
Airport entrance sign

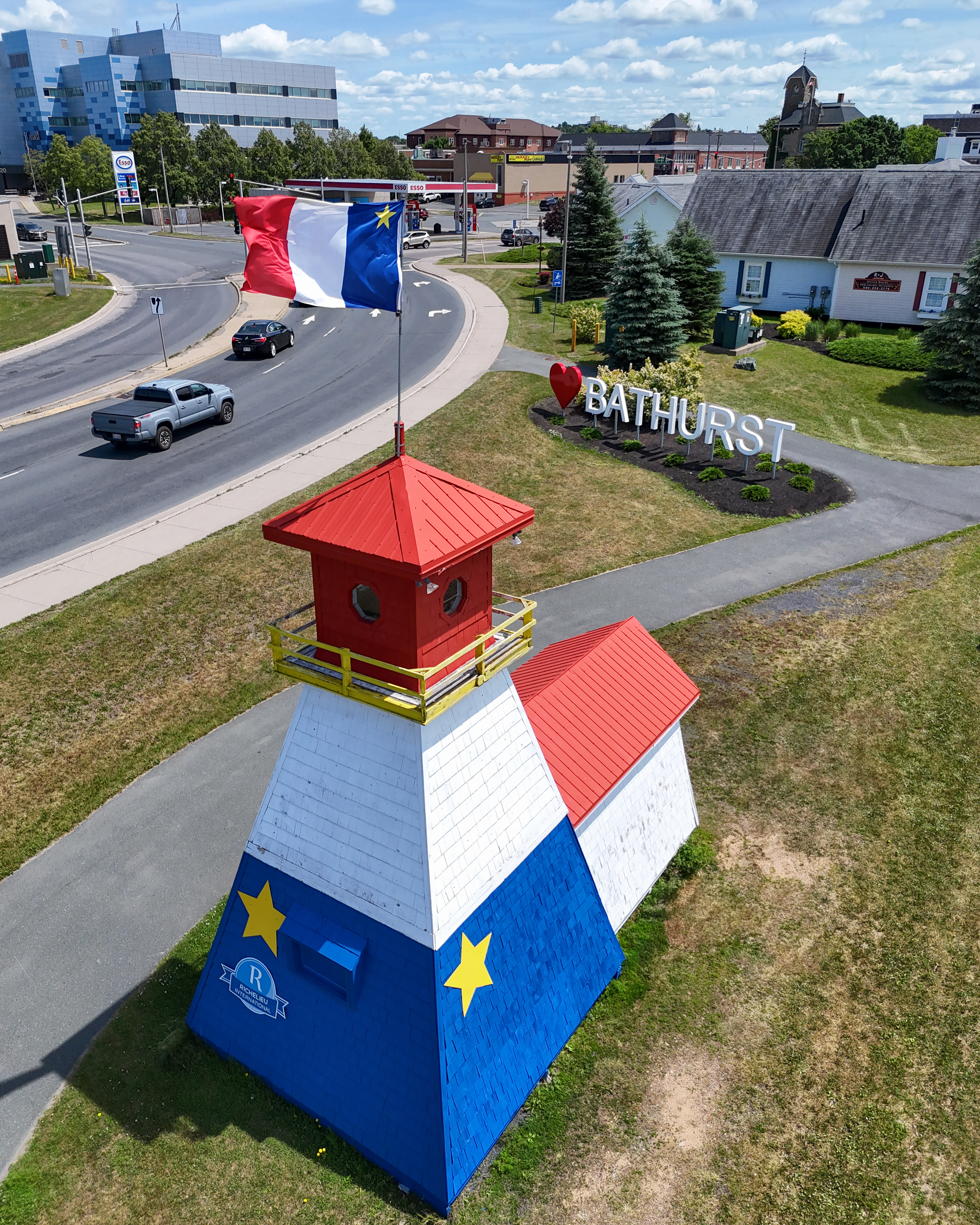
Lighthouse

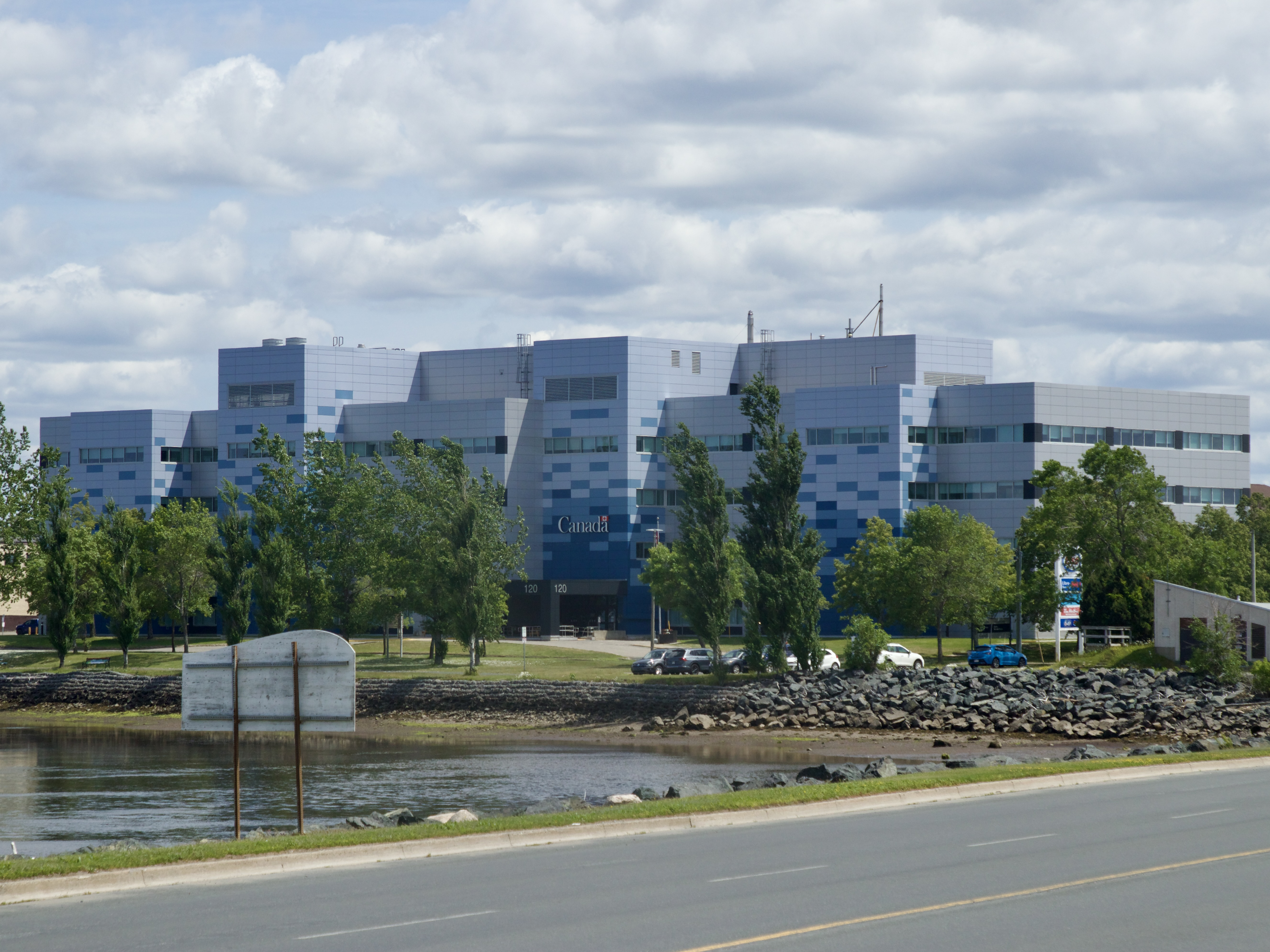
Service Canada Centre

== External relations ==
The city of Bathurst is twinned with:

- Saint-Aubin-sur-Mer, Calvados - many soldiers of the North Shore (New Brunswick) Regiment gave their lives on D-Day in the Normandy campaign of the Second World War; it was the fulcrum between Juno Beach and Sword Beach.
- Houma, Louisiana, in Terrebonne Parish is one location of the Acadian diaspora, that eventually grew into the Cajun culture of the American south.

== See also ==
- List of cities in New Brunswick
