= NBTF =

NBTF may refer to:

- National Black Theatre Festival, an African-American festival in Winston-Salem, North Carolina
- New Brunswick Teachers' Federation, a Canadian trade union and professional association
