= Sacré-Cœur College =

Historic college in Caraquet, Canada

Collège Sacré-Cœur
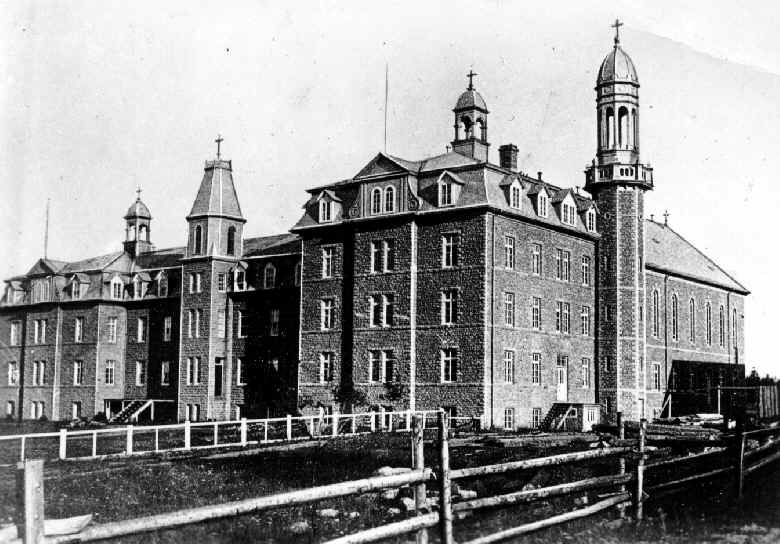
- Established: 1899
- Location: Caraquet, New Brunswick, Canada; 47°47′20″N 64°57′52″W
- Location in New Brunswick, Canada

Sacré-Cœur College was a Canadian college built in 1899. It was located in Caraquet, Canada. After being destroyed by a fire in 1915, it was rebuilt in Bathurst.

== History ==
=== Secret construction ===
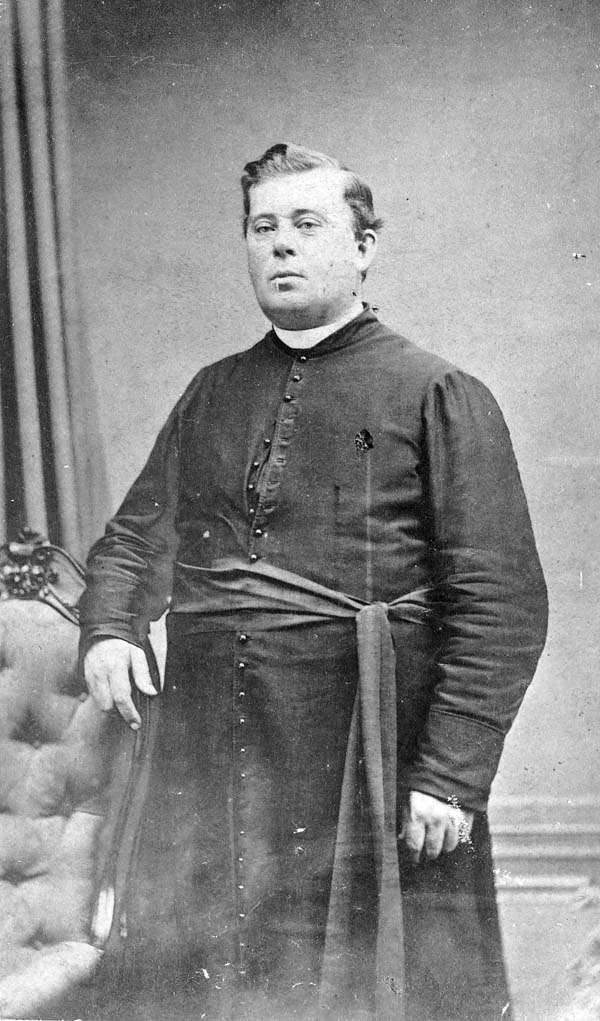
Joseph-Théophile Allard.

Joseph-Théophile Allard replaced Joseph Pelletier as the parish priest of Caraquet in 1876, following the Louis Mailloux Affair, during which opposition to school reform and the control of Anglo-Protestant merchants had resulted in two deaths. Father Allard had a conflict with the nuns of the Congregation of Notre Dame and was sent to Paquetville in 1879. He returned to Caraquet in 1885 after serving in several parishes.

As early as 1892, Father Allard began efforts to construct a college. However, he did not publicly disclose the nature of the building, leading some people to believe it was a rectory, as the old one was in ruins. Father Allard was cautious because the Bishop of Chatham, (Note: The Bishop of Chatham has held the title of Bishop of Bathurst since 1938.) James Rogers, was not supportive of Acadian education and had previously shut down Saint-Louis College in 1882. Bishop Rogers himself was trying to reopen Saint Michael's College in Chatham, which he had been forced to close in 1880.

In 1892, a contract was signed with two recently settled Frenchmen, Paul Émile Jalot and his brother Émile, to saw lumber for the project. A few Caraquet residents, supervised by Ovide Allard, the priest's brother, participated in the work. A plot of land was purchased in 1893 from André Haché, across from the Saint-Pierre-aux-Liens Church; Haché's stable was relocated to the north side of the road near the convent. Construction work finally began in the spring of 1894, with the extracted soil being used to cover the Thomas-Cooke Cemetery, repurposed for a new use. The second floor of the building was started in 1895, drawing criticism for the exaggerated size of the "rectory." The third floor began in 1896. During a visit from Bishop Rogers, Father Joseph Levasseur from Paquetville had to lie about the nature of the building. Roofing work began in 1897.

On June 19, 1898, Father Allard announced the construction of a new rectory at Sainte-Anne-du-Bocage, finally dispelling doubts about the true purpose of the building under construction.

Bishop Rogers, in addition to his suspicion of Acadian education, was reputed to have a difficult temperament, while Father Allard was described as a stubborn man. In the meantime, Father Allard traveled to Halifax to promote his project. Father Marcel-François Richard from Rogersville also tried to persuade the Eudists to settle in his community while directing the college in Chatham. In May 1898, Father Ange Le Doré traveled from France to Caraquet and reached an eight-point agreement with Father Allard, though it needed Bishop Rogers' approval. The movements of the Eudists were under surveillance, and the parish priest of Bathurst informed the bishop that they had visited Caraquet. Furthermore, Father Blanche was in Chatham on May 21, but the bishop refused to sign the agreement. Father Allard himself went to see the bishop in Chatham on September 2. Initially, the bishop refused to sign but finally agreed on the morning of September 4.

=== First year ===
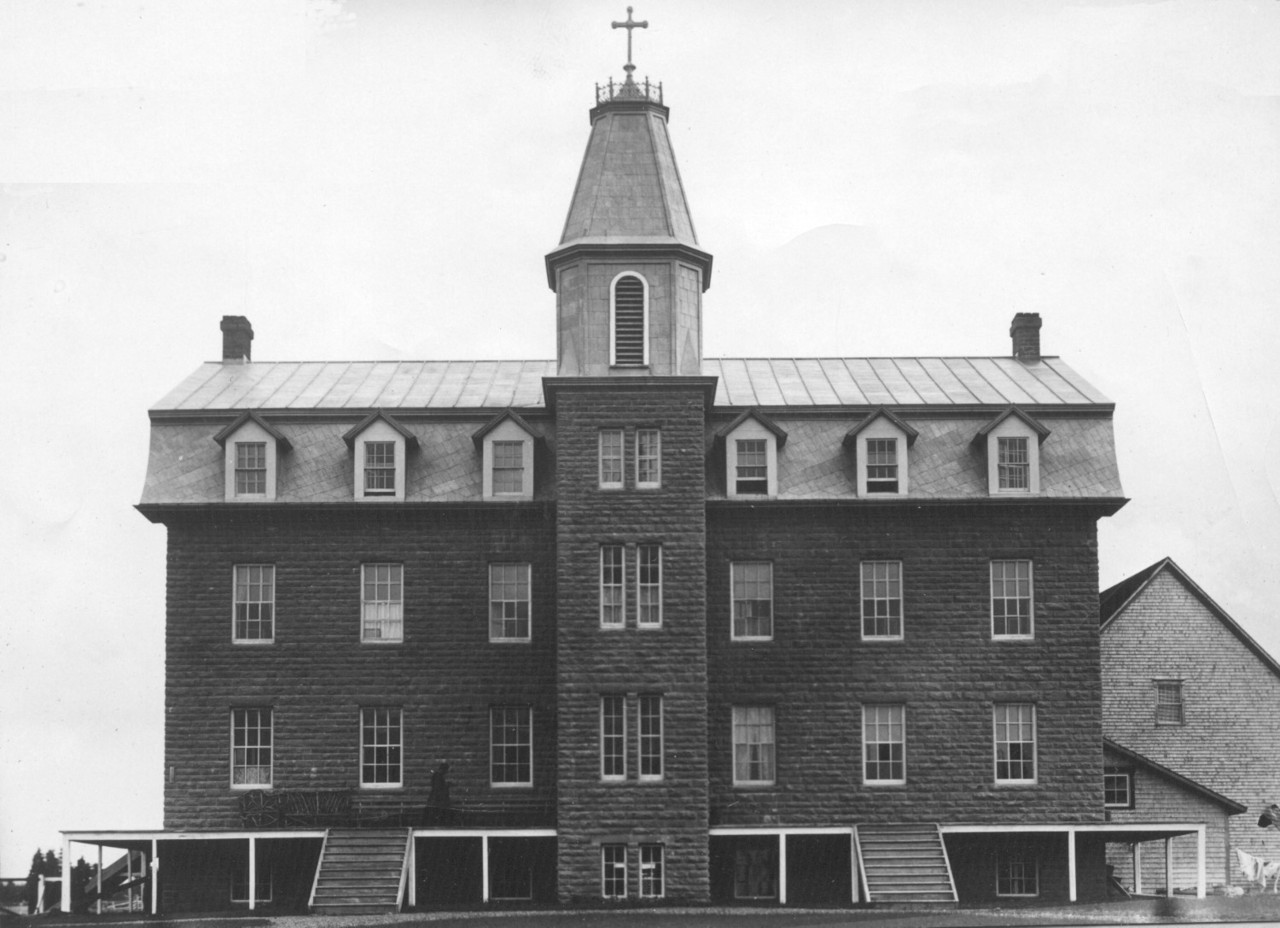
The college after its inauguration.

The official opening of the college took place on January 9, 1899; three of the seventeen students were nephews of Father Allard. Father Allard had been living in the building since late 1897 and used it as his rectory. In 1899, Father Morin complained to his superiors about Father Allard; in May of that year, the superior instructed him to leave the college, transfer its property titles, and hand over the Caraquet parish to the Eudists, as specified in the 1898 agreement. Father Allard responded in a June letter, stating that he did not want to leave the college, claiming it was "his child." Nevertheless, renovations on the old rectory began in July. During the last week of August, Father Allard took advantage of the Eudists' absence to leave the college, taking the kitchenware with him.

This incident sparked controversy 20 years later, in 1919 when Eudist Father Émile Georges wrote a series of articles about the college in the newspaper L'Évangéline. In the first article, he denounced this event, and in the series, he accused Father Allard of having a "stone disease", referencing his numerous construction projects.'

=== The leadership of Prosper Lebastard (1899–1909) ===
==== Second year ====
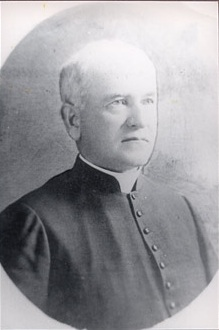
Portrait of Prosper Lebastard.

Prosper Lebastard replaced Aimé Morin as the college's superior in the summer of 1899. The start of the academic year, initially set for September 14, had to be delayed until September 21 to replace the items taken by Father Allard. The town's residents generously donated various objects to help. Father Lebastard also had to balance the college's budget without the parish revenues, which Father Allard kept. The administration anticipated a deficit by year-end, with $5,473 in debt and $2,200 in income. Lacking legal status, the institution was even unable to borrow money. Despite this, the college ended the year with a budget surplus.

The college's name was chosen by Ange Le Doré in the fall. That same autumn, nuns from the Congregation of the Sacred Hearts of Jesus and Mary arrived from Paramé, France, replacing two Shippagan workers who had been responsible for cooking, laundry, and general maintenance. The construction of the Great Hall was completed in October. However, the college was already too small for its needs.

Father Lebastard had been sent to Caraquet following the fire at Sainte-Anne College (Note: Collège Saint-Anne is now known as Université Sainte-Anne.) and also because of a conflict with Father Gustave Blanche. He was critical of his subordinates even before arriving in Caraquet. He was also very strict with students who returned late after the holiday break, as they were not accustomed to the discipline of the poorly organized schools of the time. However, relations between Father Lebastard and Father Allard improved in 1900.

On March 19, 1900, the Legislative Assembly of New Brunswick, at the initiative of Joseph Poirier, granted the college the right to confer university degrees. That same year, the appointment of Anglophone Thomas Barry as the coadjutor bishop of Chatham angered many Acadians, who had been fighting for a decade for a Francophone bishop. Father Lebastard was among many priests who did not attend the consecration ceremony, even contributing to the controversy in the pages of L'Évangéline.

==== Expansion of the college ====
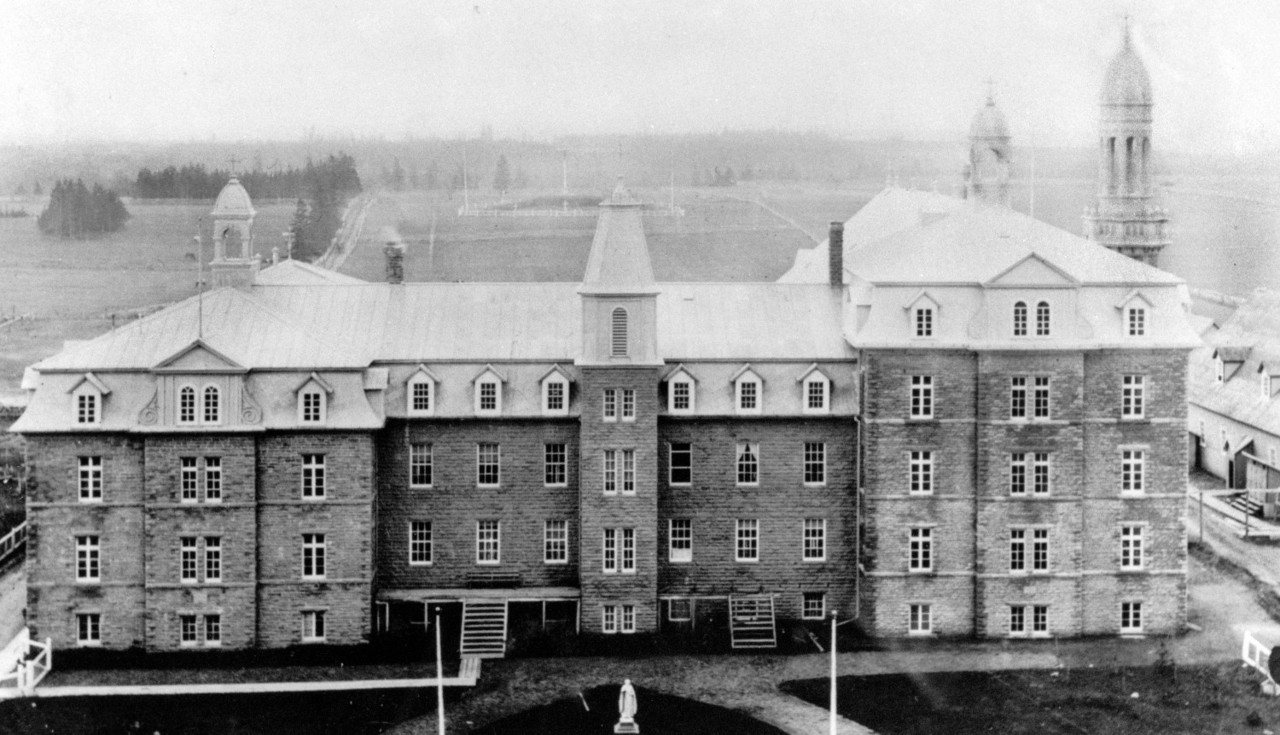
Sacré-Cœur College, 1910.

The expansion of the college was decided in 1901, partly due to the conciliatory attitude of Thomas Barry. The 1901–1902 school year began with the refusal of 15 students due to lack of space. The main issue was that additional classrooms had to be added each year to complete the full classical curriculum. According to Father Lebastard, the college had to "grow or cease to exist." In the same letter to his congregation, he requested a sum of $7,000. In October, a committee of 16 parishioners, led by Father Aimé Morin, managed to raise $3,000. The parishioners of Bas-Caraquet also contributed to the funding. The federal government and a certain Mr. Adam each provided $500. Volunteers transported the timber and stone. The services of Caraquet architect Nazaire Dugas were hired for the execution of the plans. However, the fourth year began in 1902 with the same issues: lack of space and the refusal of students. An acetylene lighting system, courtesy of Father Allard, was installed in the spring of 1903. By the fifth rentrée in September, only the study hall was completed, but the chapel was inaugurated on December 8. At this point, the college could accommodate 75 students.

==== Combes Law ====
The "Combes Law", adopted by the National Assembly of France in March 1903, and another law passed on July 7 of the same year, prohibited religious communities from teaching, leading to the closure of nearly all religious communities and the exodus of many of their members. Father Ange Le Doré, the superior of the Eudists, was one of the leaders of the opposition to this law. The Canadian community offered asylum to those who wished it, and five priests arrived in Caraquet in 1903.

=== Superiorship of Édouard Travert (1909–1912) ===
Édouard Travert became the superior in 1909. He founded the monthly newsletter Le Sacré-Cœur in the same year. An agriculture course was also added to the curriculum in 1909. This addition was part of a popular ideology at the time, aimed at steering Acadians away from fishing and toward agriculture and colonization. However, the course did not meet expectations, with only one graduate eventually studying agronomy at Cornell University.

Several deaths occurred within a few months: a student died of a heart attack in June 1909, a teacher died in July, the gardener and baker died in November, and in December, a student suffered complications after an appendectomy and had to undergo surgery again. A typhoid fever epidemic struck Caraquet in the spring of 1910, though no victims were reported at the college; the administration responded by constructing new wells. A priest died of tuberculosis in February 1912. However, it was the death of Father Allard, on January 30, 1912, that had the most impact. According to his final wishes, he was buried beneath Saint-Pierre-aux-Liens Church, and his heart was displayed in the college chapel. He bequeathed more than $7,000 to the college, allowing the administration to finally benefit from the parish's revenues.

=== Superiorship of Eugène Méry Le Beuve (1912–1916) ===
==== Final years ====
Eugène Méry Le Beuve became the superior of the college in the summer of 1912. He was criticized for his inexperience, which he openly acknowledged. The college enrolled a record number of 165 students for the following year. However, the superior feared that the opening of Saint-Thomas College in Chatham would cause students to leave Caraquet. Bishop Barry blessed the new chapel during the end-of-year ceremony in June 1913. Father Méry Le Beuve ceased the publication of the Le Sacré-Cœur newsletter in August of the same year, despite having over 1,000 subscribers.

World War I broke out in 1914. Enrollment remained relatively high despite predictions to the contrary. However, three priests were recalled to France for military service.

==== Total loss ====
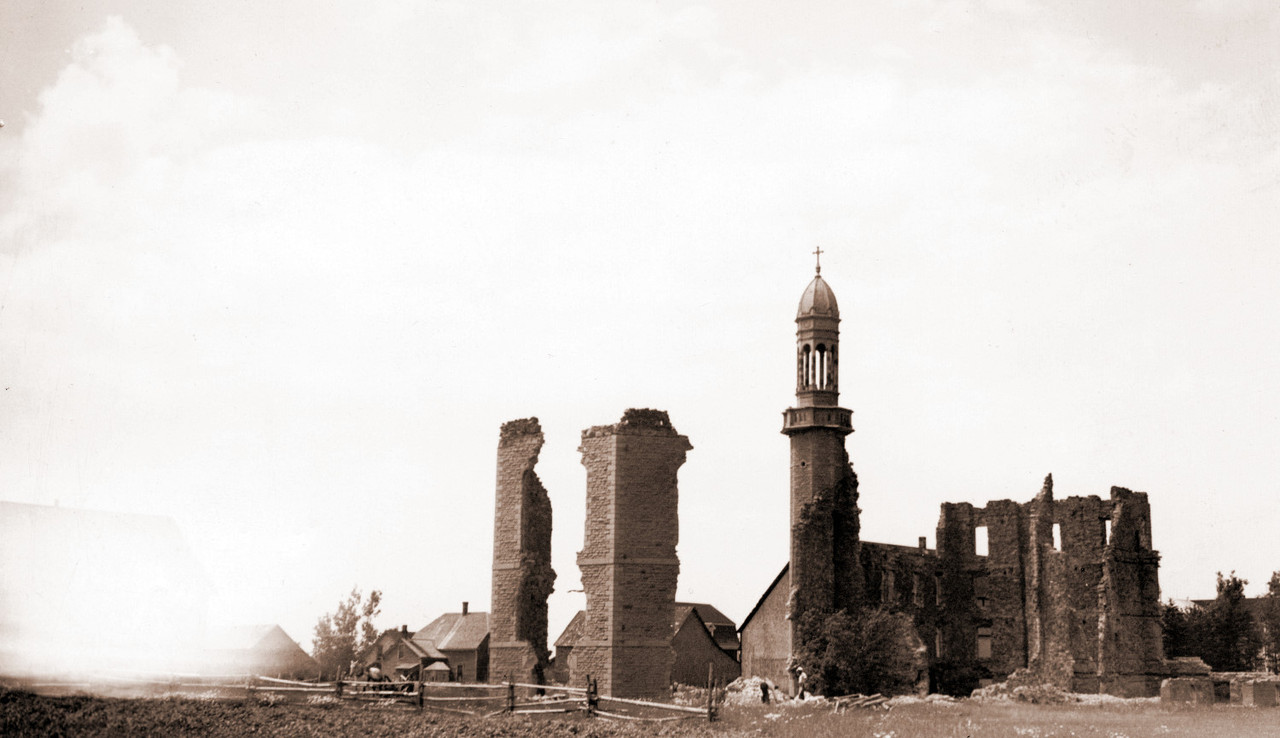
The ruins of the college.

The college was destroyed by fire in the night from December 30 to 31, 1915. There were no injuries, as the students were on vacation at the time. The building was a total loss, but the cause of the fire remains unknown. The Eudists received insurance compensation of $58,000. After paying off the debt, they were left with $50,000.

A campaign for the reconstruction of the college in Caraquet was launched in January 1916, raising $12,000. However, the Eudists preferred to rebuild the college in Bathurst, primarily due to the poor train service in Caraquet. A motion to this effect was unanimously adopted during a meeting of the college alumni. In the meantime, the students were relocated to the Juvénat-Noviciat-Scholasticat in Bathurst, which Father Lebastard had built in 1910. The final decision, however, rested with Bishop Barry. Father Lebastard provided him with a memorandum outlining his arguments. The bishop, who feared that a college in Bathurst would hurt enrollment at the anglophone college in Chatham, firmly refused. On May 13, 1916, the priest of Grand-Anse, Stanislas-Joseph Doucet, also a friend of Father Lebastard, sent the bishop a petition signed by thirty-seven members of the clergy in favor of establishing the college in Bathurst. The bishop was then compelled to authorize the reconstruction of that city.

== Aftermath ==
Some stones from the college were used to build a few houses, as stone was a rare material in local architecture. The ruins of the college were left in place until 1959 when the Caraquet Regional School was built on the site. The school was later renamed École La Nacelle and closed its doors in the 1990s. The building was purchased by the municipality in 2000, renovated, and expanded to become the Cultural Center. A bust of Saint John Eudes, placed at the front, serves as a reminder of the college's history.

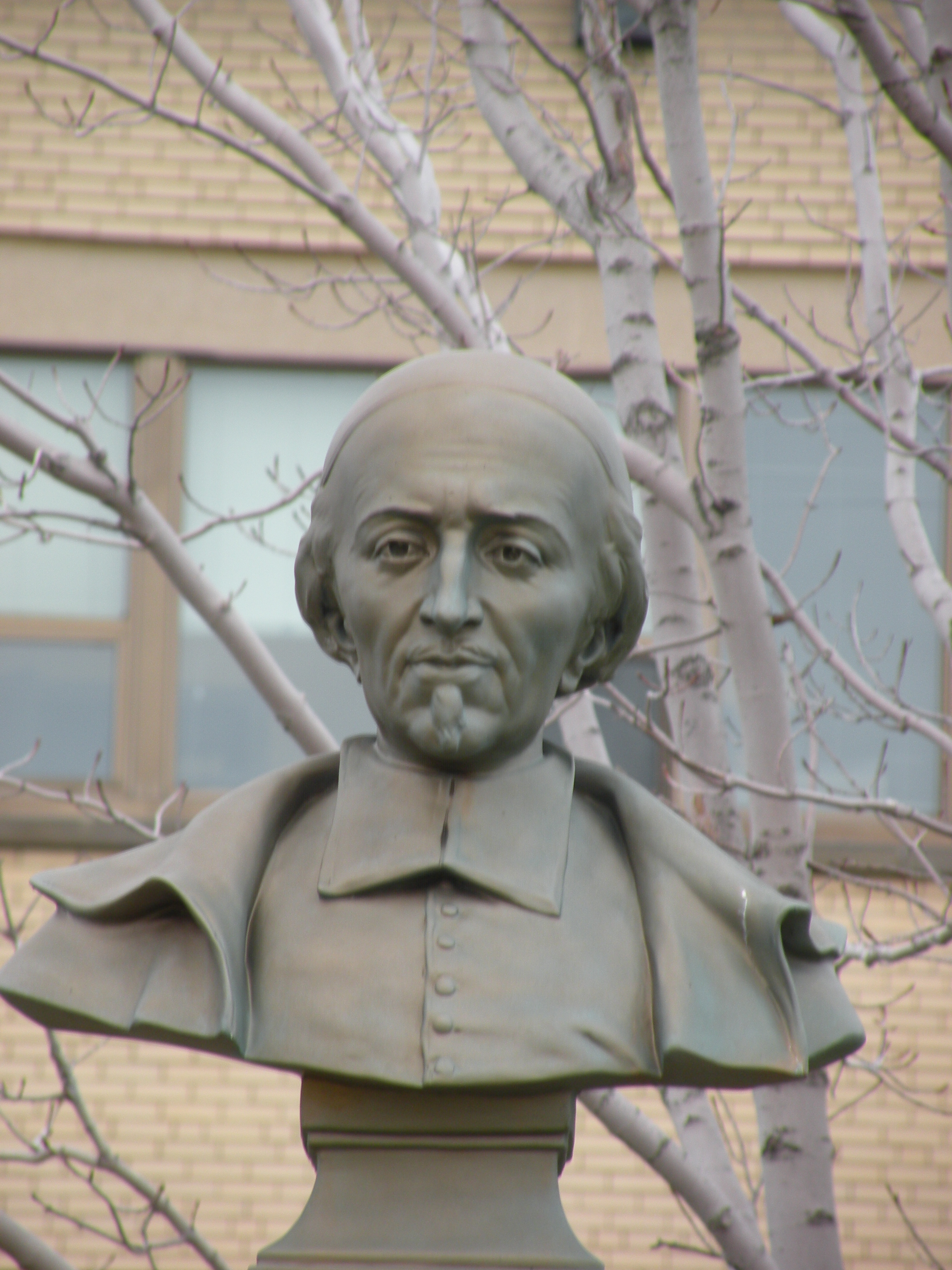
Bust of Saint John Eudes.

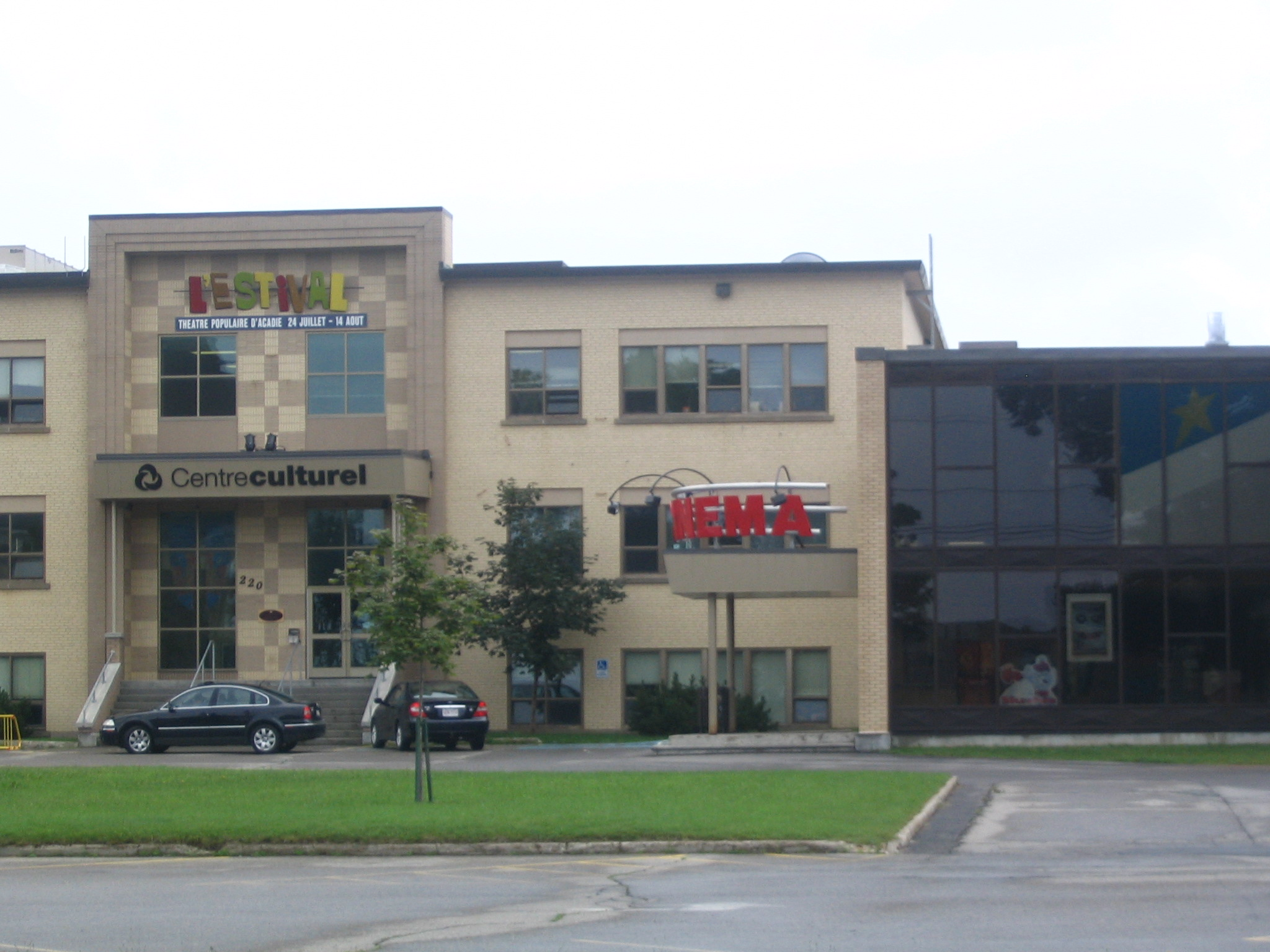
The Caraquet cultural center, occupying the college site.

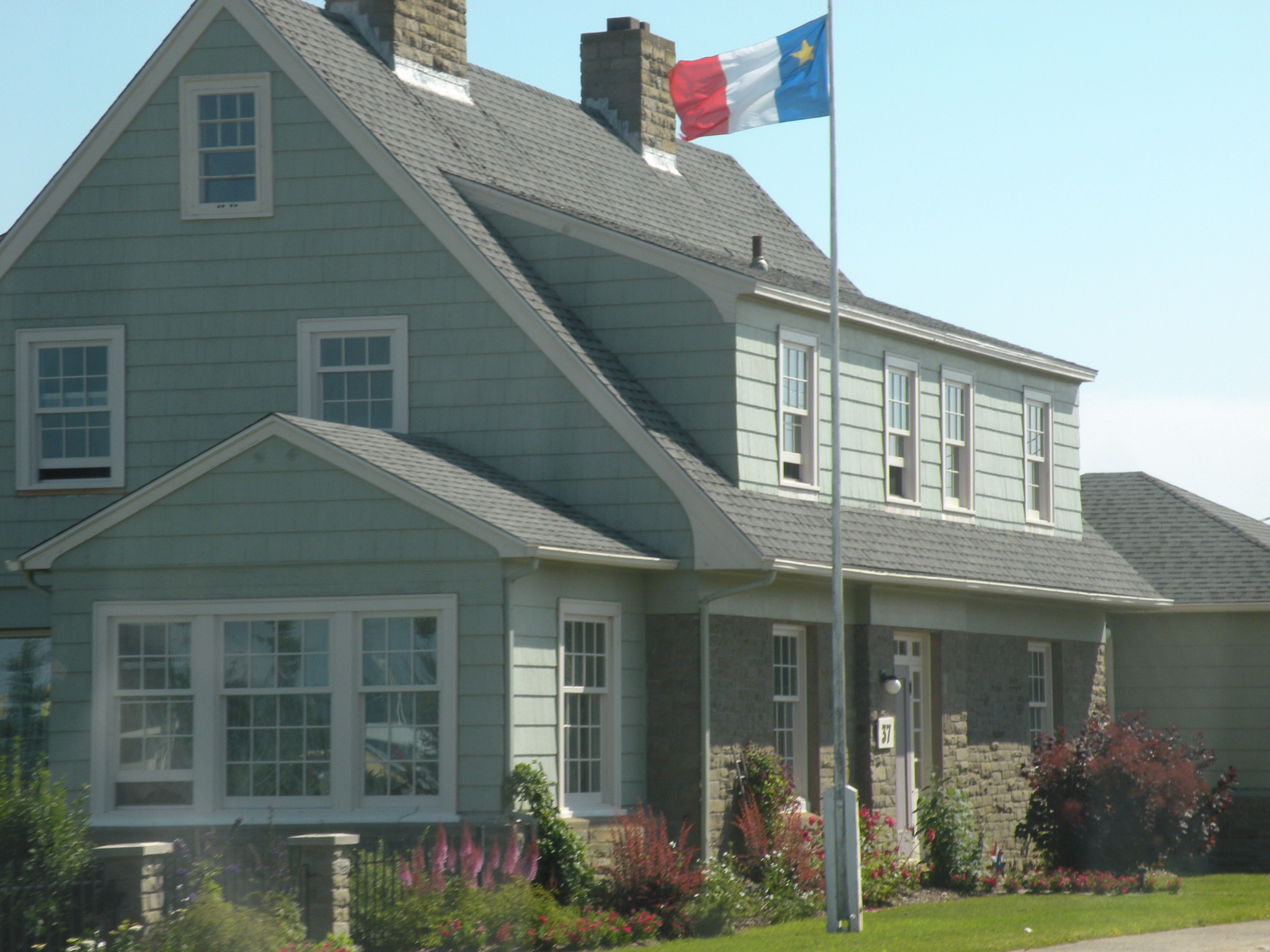
One of Caraquet's few stone houses, built in 1940.

== Organization and operation ==
=== List of superiors ===
- Aimé Morin, 1898–1899
- Prosper Lebastard, 1899–1909
- Édouard Travert, 1909–1912
- Eugène Méry Le Beuve, 1912–1916

== Training and student life ==
=== Evaluation ===
The best students were featured on the Tableau d'honneur (Honor Roll), which was also published in Le Sacré-Cœur.

=== Schedule and calendar ===
- Wake-up: 5:15 AM
- Prayer: 5:30 AM
- Mass: 6:55 AM
- Breakfast: 7:25 AM
- Classes begin at 8:00 AM
- First recess: 9:30 AM – 9:50 AM
- Lunch (midday meal): 12:00 PM
- Classes resume at 1:30 PM
- Second recess: 3:45 PM
- Study or class time: 4:15 PM – 6:00 PM
- Dinner (evening meal): 6:00 PM
- Spiritual reading: 7:00 PM, followed by study period
- Lights out: 8:30 PM

Thursday and Sunday afternoons were reserved for games and walks.

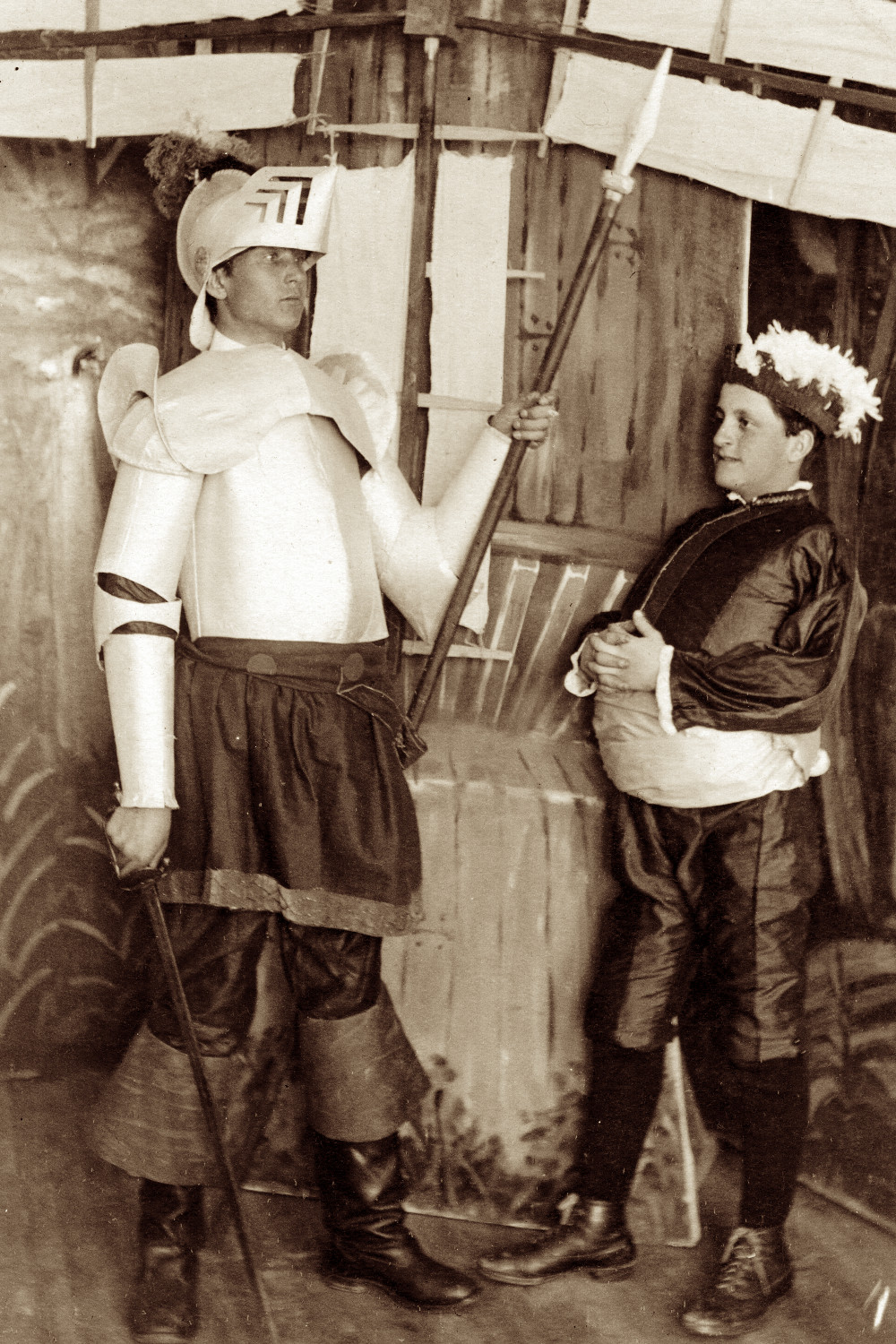
The play Don Quichotte et les petits meuniers, presented in 1906.

=== Activities ===
Sports such as baseball, soccer (football), and basketball are practiced during the summer. In the winter, ice hockey games are organized, along with sledding, walking, skating, and the building of ice castles.

The fame of the brass band and choir spread beyond the city's borders, and they were invited to ceremonies and boat blessing events. However, the most popular group was the theater troupe, founded in 1903 and directed by Fathers Joseph Courtois and Eugène Collard. They performed plays such as The Merchant of Venice, Prince for a Day, Richard III, Tribulations of the Marquis de la Grenouillère, Vercingetorix, and Young Poachers, as well as original productions like My Cod Liver Oil.

Lectures were also popular, such as one on astronomy given by Stanislas-Joseph Doucet.

Two college congregations were established: the Saint-Cœur de Marie for the younger students and the Sacré-Cœur for the older students. Additionally, the Saint-Jean-Eudes Circle was established in 1908.

== See also ==
- Caraquet
- Caraquet Parish, New Brunswick
- New Brunswick
- Education in New Brunswick

== Bibliography ==
- LeBreton, Clarence (1991). Le Collège de Caraquet : 1892–1916. Montréal: Éditions du Fleuve. p. 268. ISBN 2-89372-023-4.
