= Louis Mailloux Affair =

Violent events in New Brunswick, Canada in 1875

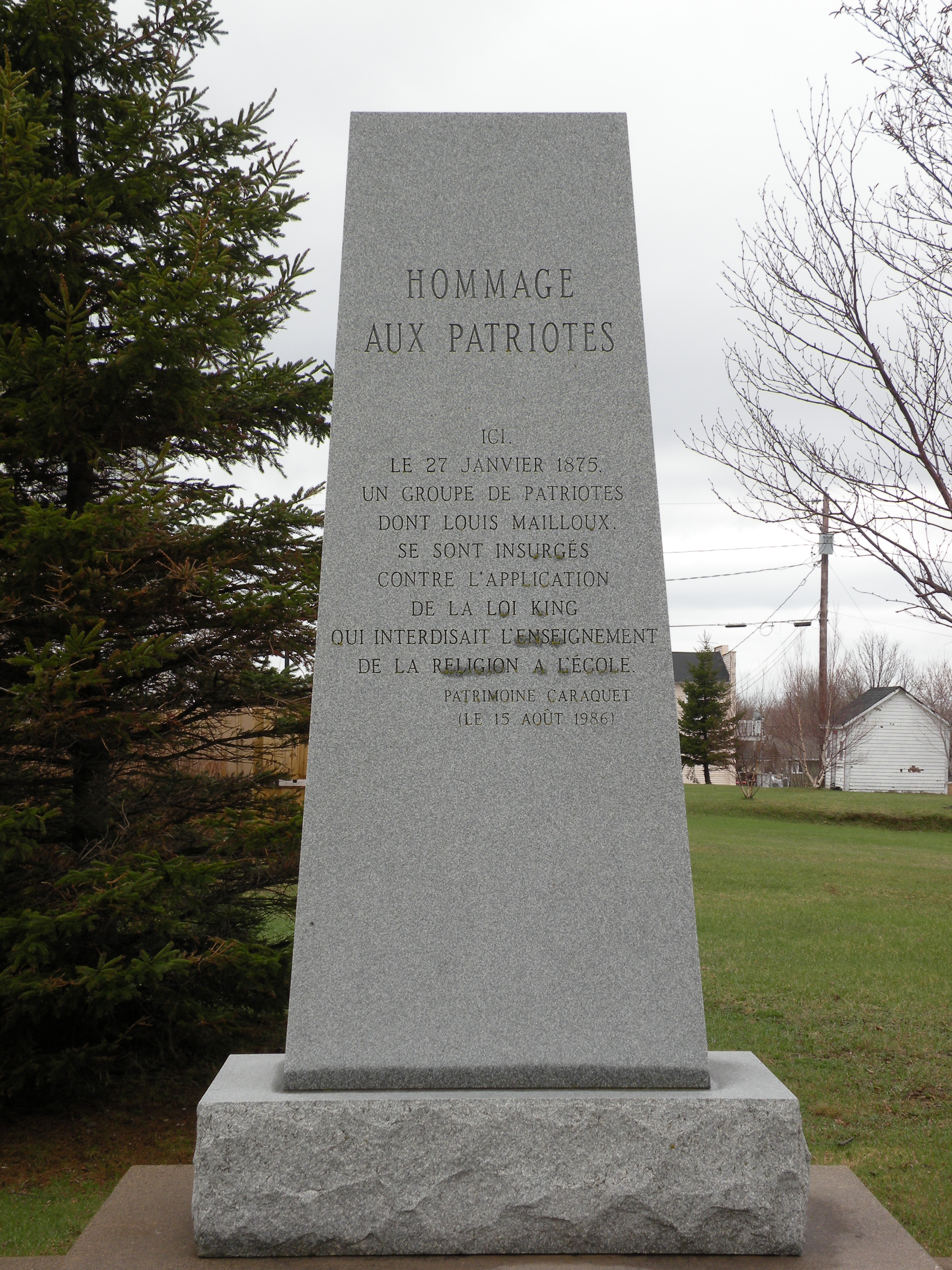
Hommage aux patriotes.

The Louis Mailloux Affair (Note: Other names used to describe the events include the Caraquet riots, the Caraquet revolt, etc. It is customary to refer to the events by the full name of Louis Mailloux.) was a series of violent events similar to a jacquerie that occurred in the town of Caraquet, New Brunswick (Canada), in January 1875.

In 1871 Law 87 was enacted to reform the public education system in the province and enhanced its funding. This legislation sparked the New Brunswick Schools Question, leading to political turmoil in the province and throughout Canada for four years.

Caraquet was one of the cities where opposition to the school issue was strongest. The precarious situation of a portion of the population, worsened by the control of a minority of Anglophone merchants, escalated in January 1875. Several riots and demonstrations occurred; some were related to the school issue, others were not. The police, supported by a militia and later by the army, intervened. On January 27, a shootout took place at André Albert's house, resulting in the deaths of two individuals, John Gifford and Louis Mailloux.

After a rushed investigation, multiple judicial trials were conducted to address the riots and the death of John Gifford, while overlooking that of Louis Mailloux. In the end, all charges in the case were dropped, and the accused were set free; nevertheless, the events had deeply divided the province.

More than a century later opinions on these events are still divided and continue to provoke controversies. The Louis Mailloux Affair remains a prominent part of Acadian culture and has inspired numerous musical and theatrical works.

== Background ==
=== Political context ===
==== State of Education in New Brunswick ====
Public education in New Brunswick has evolved slowly since its establishment in 1819. The system has faced challenges related to funding, access, and quality, as well as a lack of interest from the population. The Parish Schools Act of 1858 aimed to address these issues by making education more accessible and improving its quality. It also introduced the election of three school trustees (commissioners) at the parish level. However, ambiguities in the law led to the proliferation of denominational schools in the province. Additionally, school funding remained the responsibility of parents, resulting in poorer populations receiving a lower-quality education. Canadian Confederation, the Intercolonial Railway, the end of the Canadian-American Reciprocity Treaty, and the Fenian raids dominated New Brunswick politics, which diverted attention from education for several years.

==== Common Schools Act ====
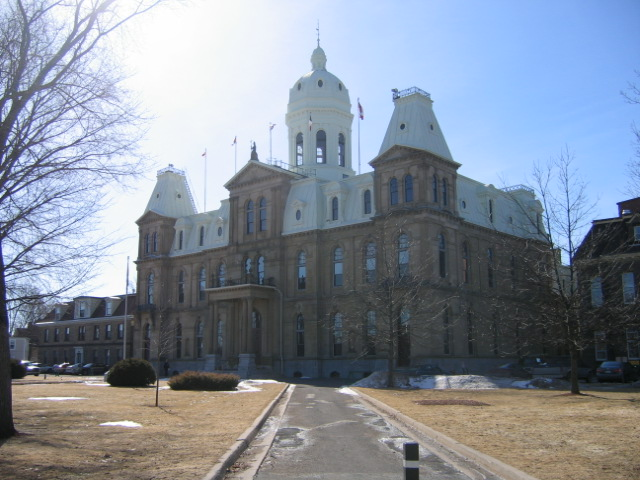
New Brunswick Legislative Assembly Building, Fredericton.

In 1869, Premier George Edwin King proposed a bill to reform the province's education system. Faced with opposition from prominent Catholic newspapers, Le Moniteur Acadien and The Morning Freeman, and to maintain power, King withdrew the bill just before the 1870 election and was re-elected. The bill was reintroduced to the Legislative Assembly of New Brunswick in 1871. Law 87, also known as the Common Schools Act, established school boards and a school tax, mandated non-denominational schools, and prohibited religious symbols. Despite opposition from some members of parliament and a media campaign, the bill was passed on May 5, 1871.

==== New Brunswick Schools Question ====
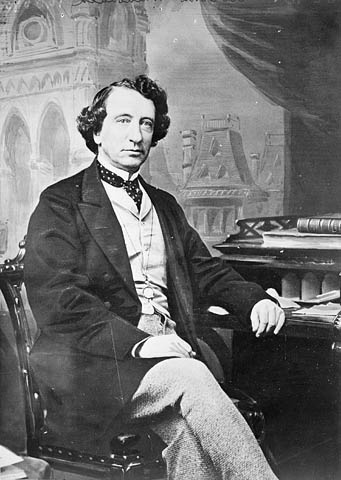
Canadian Prime Minister John A. MacDonald in 1868, National Archives of Canada.

A movement was formed to protect Catholic schools, led by bishops Sweeney and Rogers. The issue was brought to the House of Commons of Canada, where Prime Minister John A. Macdonald declined to defend Catholics, citing the division of powers that granted control of education to the provinces. MPs were divided on the matter, with a proposed constitutional amendment and the New Brunswick government hinting at leaving Confederation if the debate persisted. A motion of censure against Macdonald had no impact, as Quebec Conservative MPs, members of the Prime Minister's party, supported him. In the 1872 election, the Conservatives lost 7 seats in Quebec, including George-Étienne Cartier, but Macdonald remained in power. This election reflected Quebec nationalism, with the victory of Honoré Mercier. Mercier delivered a patriotic speech on May 14, 1873, in support of New Brunswick Catholics, garnering the support of most French Canadian MPs. A motion by John Costigan proposed referring the matter to the Judicial Committee of the Privy Council in London, which was voted on May 15, 1873. This, along with the Pacific Scandal, led to Macdonald handing power to Alexander Mackenzie's Liberal Party. In the 1874 election, Honoré Mercier was not allowed to run as a Liberal candidate, despite his defense of Catholics. Mackenzie's government won the election and appointed Anglin as Speaker of the House of Commons, sidelining him from the debate. No Catholic from New Brunswick was included in the cabinet, and the Throne Speech did not address the Schools Question. On July 17, 1874, the Judicial Committee of the Privy Council declared they had no jurisdiction over the enforcement of Law 87.

In the meantime, Catholic opposition in New Brunswick was suppressed.

=== Socioeconomic Context ===
==== Caraquet society ====
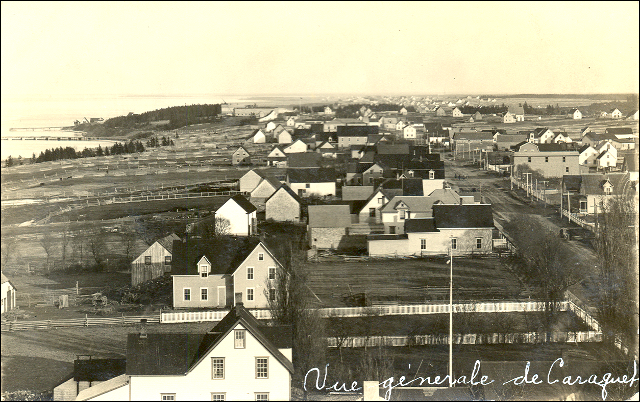
Caraquet, around 1900.

Caraquet is a town founded by two main pioneer groups: The first group consisted of Acadians who survived the Great Upheaval and settled west of the town from 1757 onwards. They primarily practiced agriculture, a vocation encouraged by the clergy. The second group settled to the east of the town and comprised survivors of the Battle of the Restigouche, individuals from Gaspésie and Bas-Saint-Laurent, predominantly of Norman descent, and some Micmacs. They were primarily involved in fishing and played a significant role in the town's food supply.

For fifty years, the two founding family groups harbored mutual animosity, refraining from intermarriage. In the early 19th century, a new group of English-speaking, Protestant inhabitants arrived in Caraquet from the UK and Jersey, attracted by the presence of fishermen. Their numbers swelled with the establishment of the Charles Robin Company in 1837. Merchants flocked to the town center, constructing stores, warehouses, grand residences, docks, and port facilities. By 1871, amidst the school controversy, Caraquet's population stood at 3,111 with 79 English speakers.

Despite their small number, Anglo-Protestant merchants leveraged their connections to the Anglophone majority of the province to secure various government positions. These merchants also established a dual monopoly system with the fishermen, who were compensated with tokens that could only be redeemed at the company's stores. During the winter, when fishermen ran out of tokens, they resorted to buying on credit. Fishermen were limited to choosing between the Robin, Rive, Young, and Fruing families, all of whom employed the same method, creating a sense of dependency among the residents of the eastern part of the town. As a result, the clergy encouraged the population to engage in agriculture.

==== Caraquet elite ====
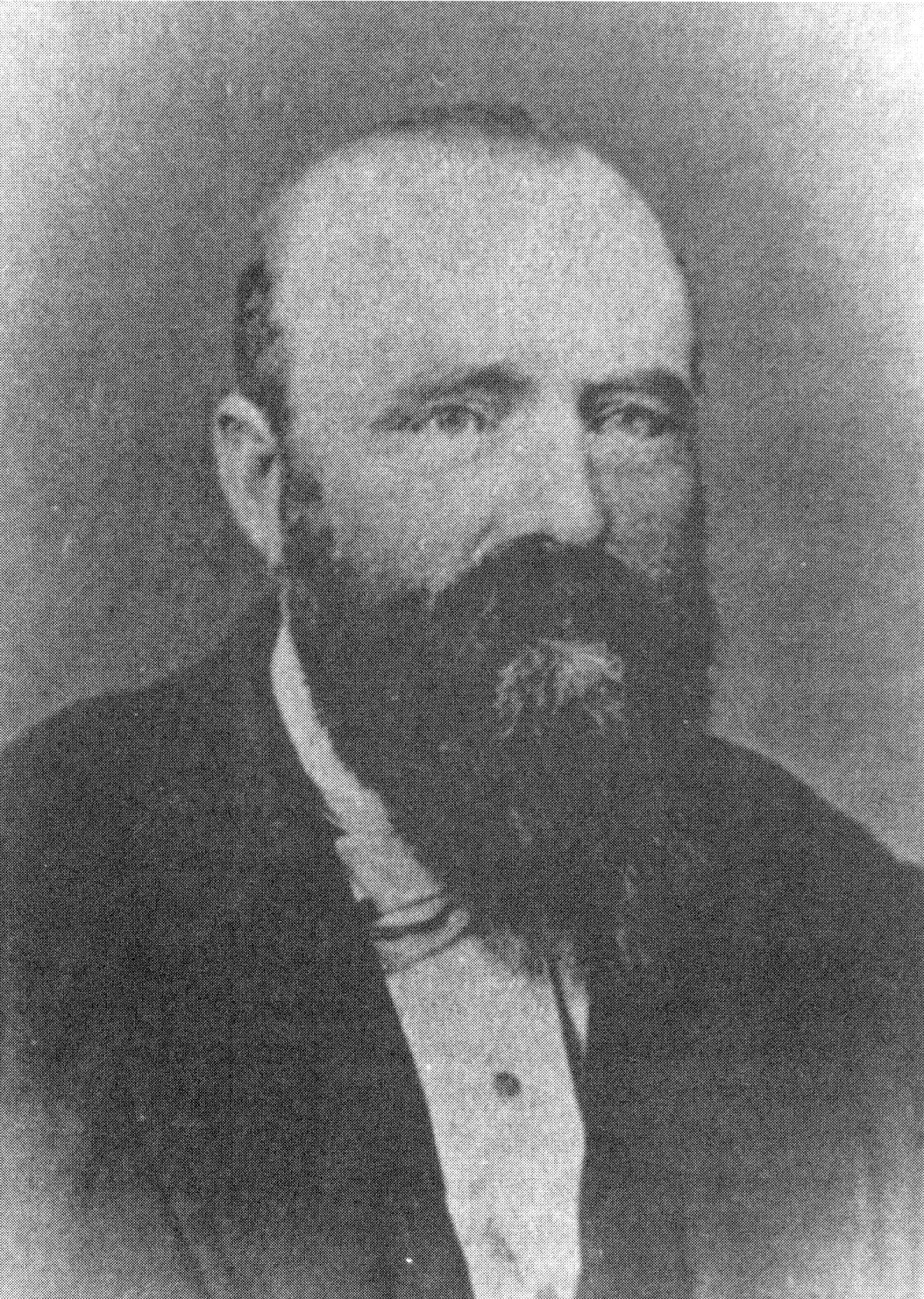
Robert Young, merchant and influential politician.

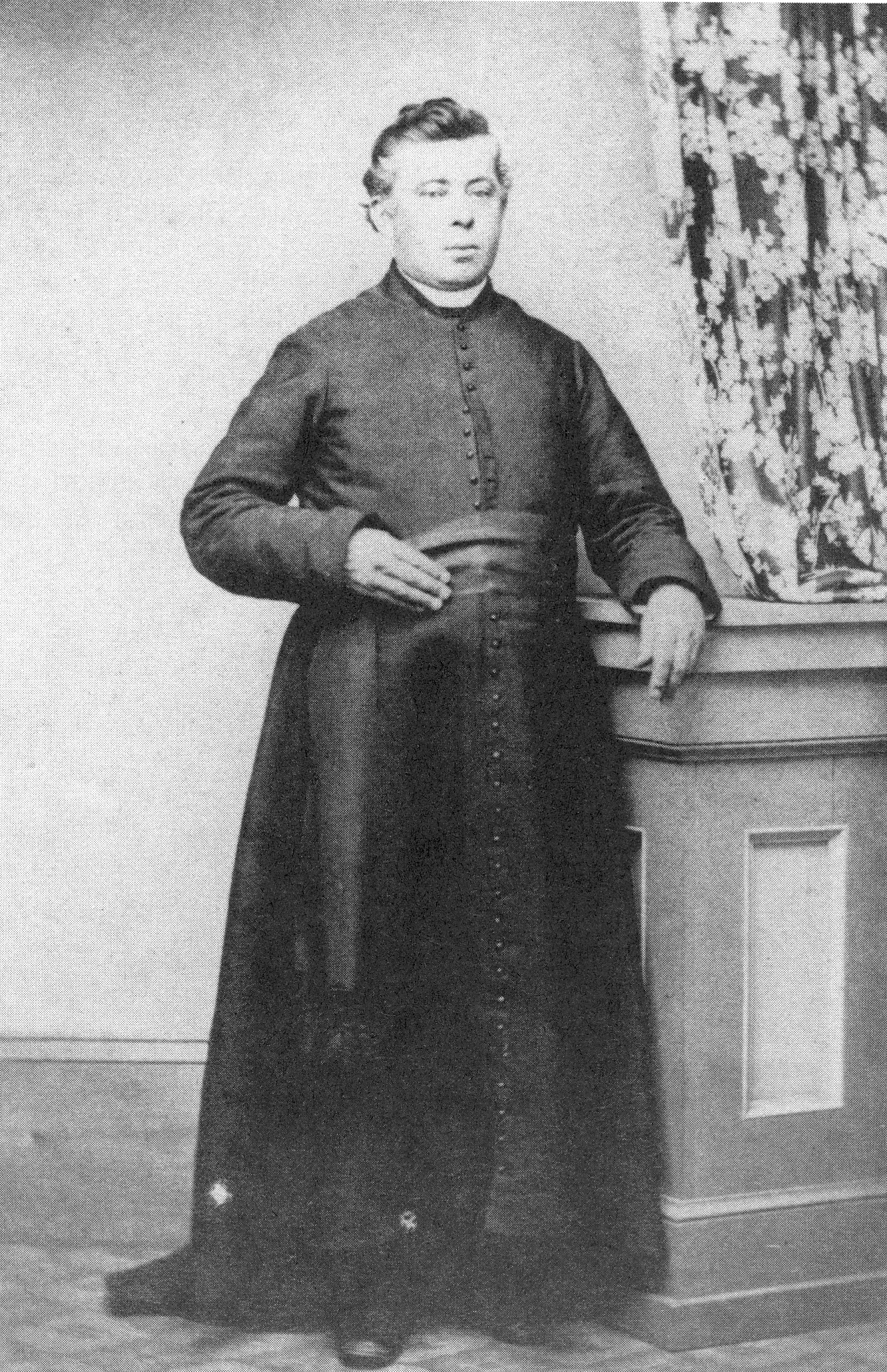
Joseph Pelletier, priest.

In the late 19th century, one of the most influential figures in Caraquet was Robert Young (1834–1904), who had been in the town since 1851 to oversee his father's company, James Young, based in Tracadie. Young married Sarah Hubbard on December 23, 1857. He was elected to the New Brunswick Legislative Assembly in 1861 and re-elected in 1865 and 1866. However, he did not run in the 1870 election, where Théotime Blanchard and Napier emerged as winners. Young was appointed to the Legislative Council in 1867 and served as its president until 1883. He strongly opposed the Canadian Confederation and supported John Meahan over Timothy Anglin in Gloucester, with the latter being invited by Father Joseph Pelletier.

James G.C. Blackhall (1827–1910) was born in Caraquet to Scottish parents. After his father John's death in 1857, he inherited all of his civil duties and took on roles such as justice of the peace, postmaster, customs officer, and coroner.

Philippe Rive was born in Saint-Pierre, Jersey, in 1838. He immigrated to Caraquet to open a fishing business and also served as the Norwegian consul. On November 15, 1876, he married Catherine Dwyer, a schoolteacher from Rexton.

Joseph Pelletier was born in 1828 in Kamouraska, Quebec. He was ordained as a priest in 1853 and later settled in Caraquet in 1869. In 1874, he established a convent and entrusted its management to the Congregation of Notre Dame of Montreal. Pelletier strongly opposed Law 87 and advocated for a separate school system for the Catholic minority, similar to the arrangement in Quebec for the Protestant minority.

Théotime Blanchard, born in Caraquet in 1844, was a schoolteacher elected to the Legislative Assembly in 1870. He aligned himself with Father Pelletier and urged the residents of his town to resist paying the school tax.

== Riots of Caraquet ==
=== Formation of the school board ===
In November 1874, a meeting was held by Théotime Blanchard to appoint officers to various public offices in the Caraquet parish, including the three school district positions as per Article 31 of the Common Schools Act. These appointments required approval from the Executive Council of the province, chaired by Caraquet resident Robert Young. The proceedings were set to begin on January 6, 1875. However, on January 4, a meeting was called by Young in Caraquet, attended only by members of the city's Anglophone minority. The nineteen attendees signed a petition informing the Executive Council that the November meeting was invalid and the appointed commissioners were disqualified under Article 31 of the Common Schools Act for not paying their school taxes. At the same meeting, a new school board was established with John Sewell, Philip Rive, and James G.C. Blackhall. Catherine Dwyer, who later married Philip Rive, was appointed as the teacher, and a school was rented. The teacher was instructed not to accept children from families who opposed this meeting. Robert Young personally presented the petition to the Executive Council.

Location map.

=== Beginning of hostilities ===
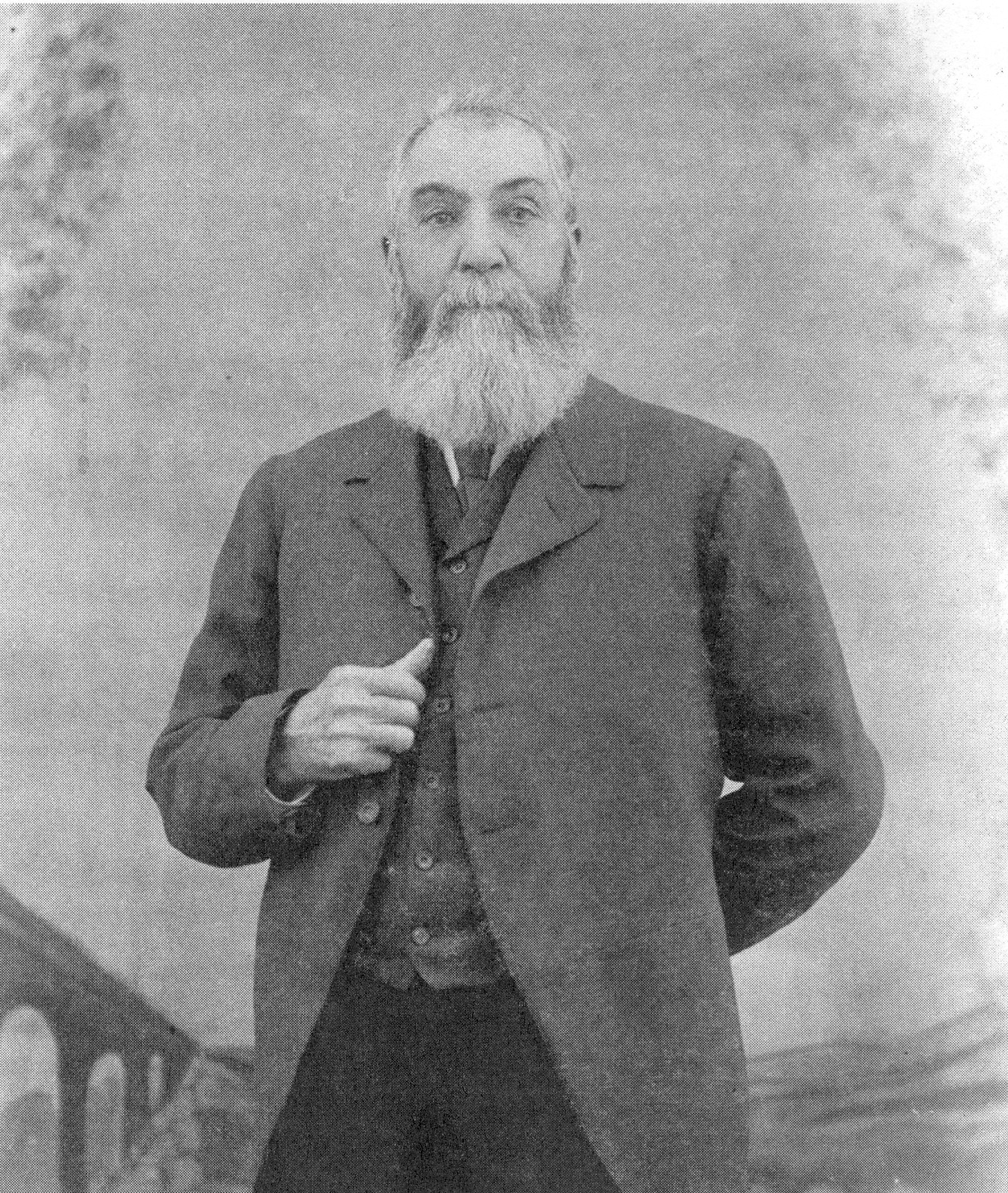
James G.C. Blackhall, merchant and school superintendent.

A second meeting was called by Robert Young on January 14, 1875, to establish tax rates and collection methods. During the meeting, a motion was made to appoint Philip Duval (Note: Philip Duval (1840–1921), originally from Jersey and of the Methodist religion, settled in Caraquet, where he married Suzanne Cormier on October 18, 1866.) as the chairman of the assembly. Despite most people voting against it, their choice was disregarded as they had not paid the school tax and lost their voting rights. Consequently, the chairman and Blackhall were promptly expelled from the meeting, which concluded without reaching any decisions.

The following day, on January 15, around thirty men who had attended the previous meeting went to the school (Note: Located on Saint-Pierre Boulevard, near the current Tim Hortons restaurant, across from Place Caraquet.) to organize another meeting, this time targeting Catholics. It was ten o'clock in the morning, and the door was locked. The men approached James Blackhall, who lived nearby, to request the keys. While some conversed with Blackhall, others went to Robin's store to fetch rum. Upon their return, influenced by alcohol, some were even singing La Marseillaise. (Note: Before Ave Maris Stella was adopted as the national anthem of Acadia in 1884, various patriotic songs, including La Marseillaise, were used.) Their numbers had swelled to fifty, and they demanded Blackhall's resignation. The group proceeded to ransack the house, nearly causing a fire until Blackhall eventually agreed to sign his resignation. Subsequently, they visited Martin Haché and Stanislas Légère, two Acadians who had paid their taxes, (Note: They are nicknamed the Bourbons for this reason.) demanding that they sign a letter expressing their opposition to the school law. Additionally, the rioters extorted money from Martin Haché and Mr. Ahier. Philip Rive preemptively resigned from the school board without waiting for a visit from the rioters.

Among the other places visited by the rioters was Robert Young's store, (Note: Located where Dugas Equipment is today, along Saint-Pierre Boulevard, directly east of the port.) as he was away in Fredericton at the time. The rioters were greeted by clerk Colson Hubbard, a relative of Robert Young's wife, Sarah Hubbard. They purchased provisions and rum and threatened another clerk, Hubert Blanchard, who was also an Acadian and had paid the tax.

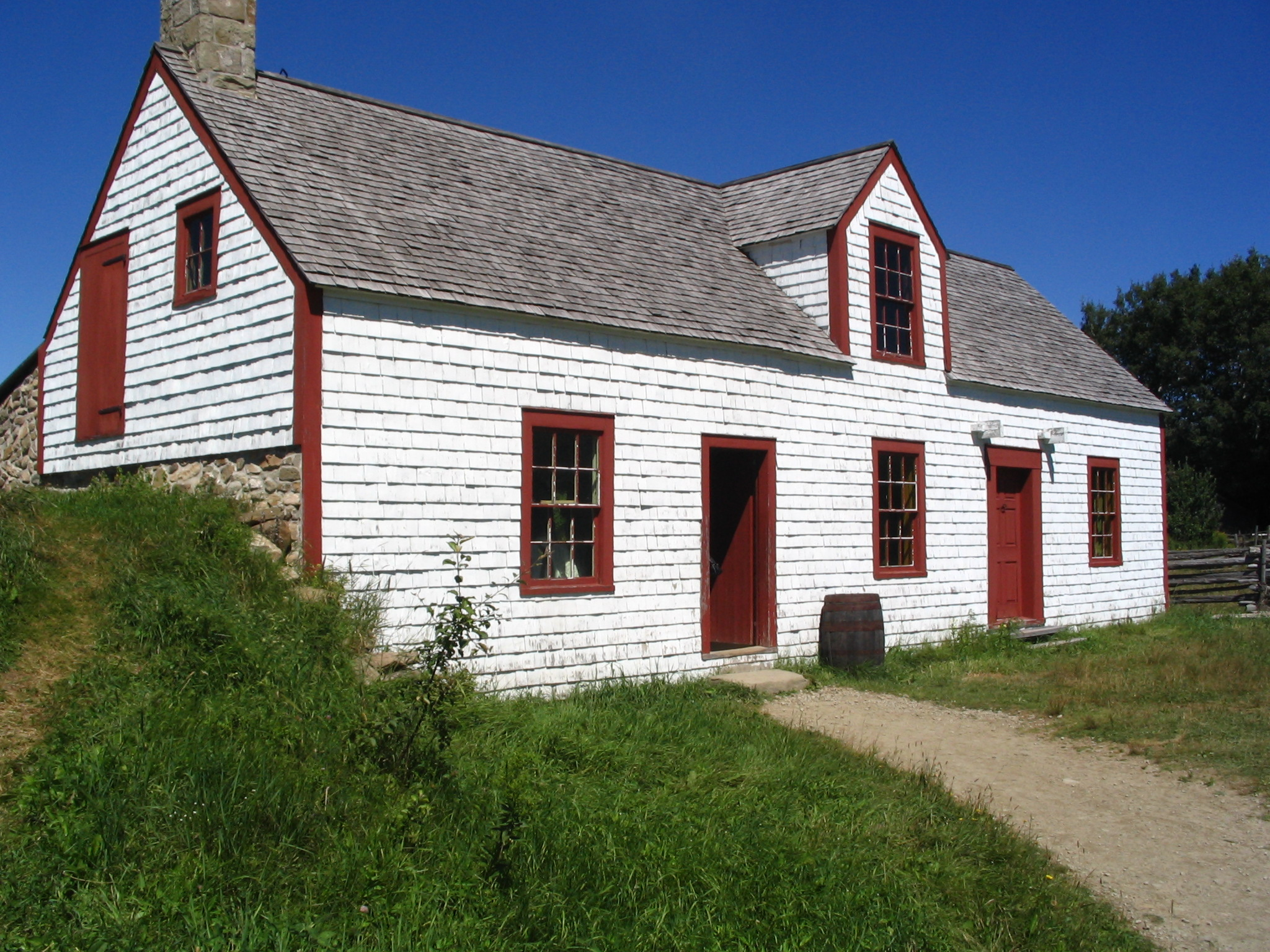
Blackhall House, moved to the Village historique acadien in 1976.

After the rioters left the Young residence, Sarah Hubbard sent a telegram to her husband. According to some sources, this telegram was rather sent by Philip Rive.

They say that they are done with us Protestants except you. They threathen to take your life in the moment you arrive. From what happened yesterday we are affraid you are not safe. If they gather and get liquor, wich they are bound to have when they need, they do not know where to stop. They say after they put you through they are going to all merchants to make them burn all mortgages and accounts to date.

Robert Young received the telegram while passing through the Sackville region. He then visited his friend William Kelly in Chatham before returning to Caraquet on January 22. The rioters were identified by clerk Colson Hubbard during their visit to the store; the arrest warrants were issued the day after Young's arrival.

Caraquet Priest Pelletier received an anonymous letter, rumored to be from clerk Colson Hubbard, threatening to burn down the rectory of the Saint-Pierre-aux-Liens Church and other buildings unless he calms the people down. He read the letter during Sunday mass on January 24, causing many to view it as a threat. The next morning, around a hundred people gathered at Robert Young's house, where he had barricaded himself with friends who were armed. The situation ended peacefully as the rioters left without successfully negotiating with Young.

=== Arrival of reinforcements ===
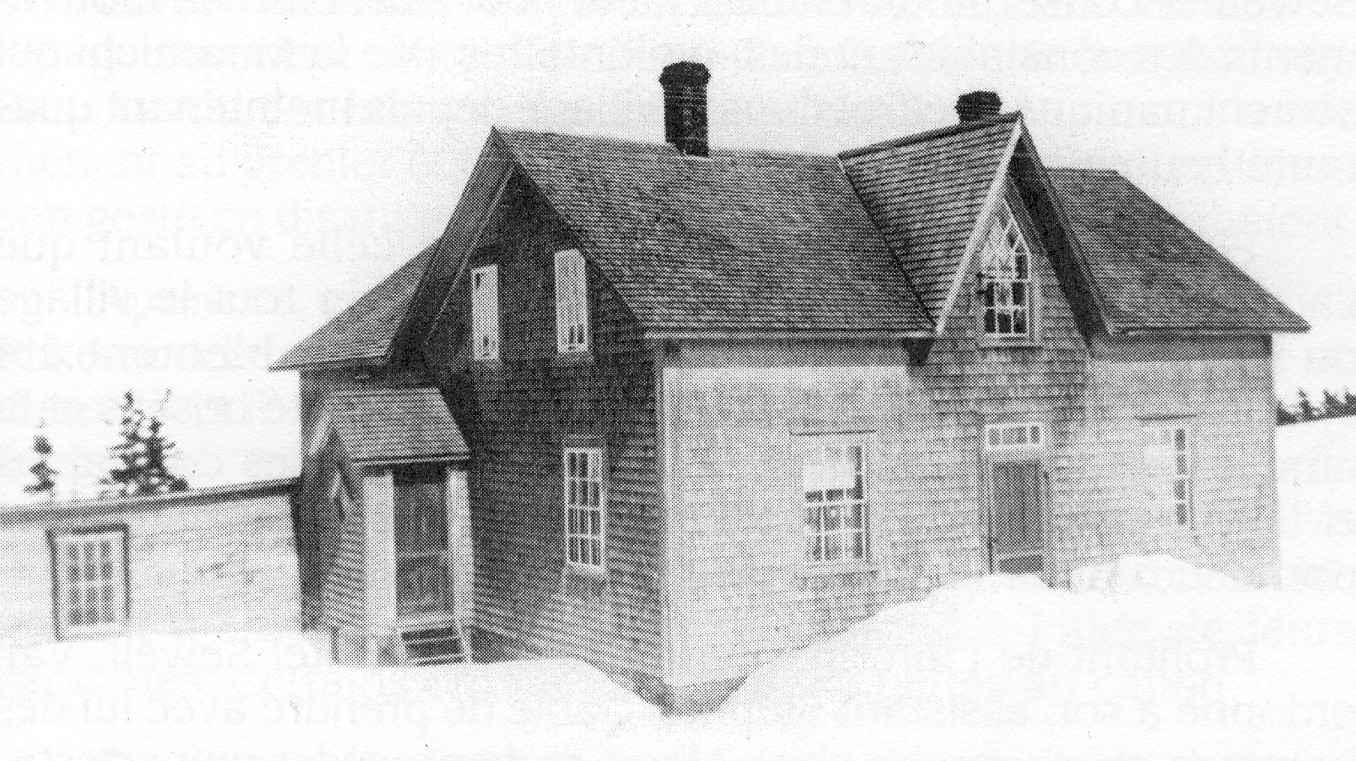
The Sewell Hotel in 1890.

After receiving the arrest warrants, Sheriff Robert B. Vail of Bathurst called for reinforcement from the honorable William Kelly of Chatham, whom Young had visited before returning to Caraquet. Vail arrived in Caraquet on January 26 at three o'clock in the morning, accompanied by six constables. (Note: Stephen Gable, Alfred Gammon, Joseph Gammon, Robert Ramsey, William Eddy, and David Eddy.) They were joined early in the morning by John and Richard Sewell of Pokemouche. They stayed at the Sewell Hotel (Note: Located on the current Patriotes Street, near the current Royal Canadian Mounted Police station.) while Vail went to Robert Young's residence. A group of twenty men, (Note: Robert Manderson, Sam Wilcox, Peter Manderson, James Loggie, George Loggie, Dudley Wells, Philip Perlay, Hugh Marquis, John Cassidy, Donald McGruer, Allan Rand, Isaac Clark, Charles Call, William Reid, James Chapman, John Gifford, Henry Burbridge, Henry Bannister, William Carter, and William Fenton.) sent by William Kelly, arrived on January 27 at dawn. These were mercenaries because the law prohibited Vail from calling on constables from outside the county without the permission of three justices of the peace. Vail happened to be in Caraquet during the events of January 15.

Rumors are circulating, leading to the arrest of Joseph Lebouthillier, Éloi Lanteigne, and Gustave Lanteigne. Multiple individuals are reportedly subjected to mistreatment. The lack of French-speaking constables or militia members exacerbates the situation. Gervais Chiasson, who is mistaken for Gervais Lanteigne, is beaten and detained despite having no involvement in the riots.

=== Shooting ===
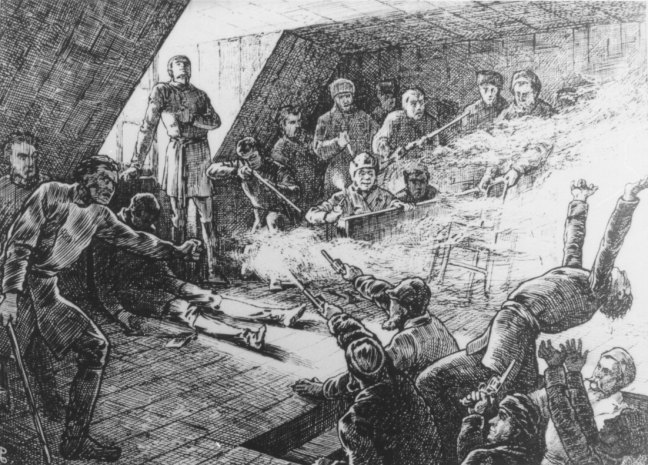
Death of Constable Gifford, a cartoon of the shooting that appeared in the Canadian Illustrated News on February 13, 1875. The article did not even mention Mailloux's death.

On the afternoon of January 27, 14 young men from Caraquet gathered to play cards in the attic of André Albert's house, located across from the Sewell Hotel. In the kitchen, Louis Parisé, André Albert's wife, and his sister-in-law, Clothilde Chiasson, who is also the mother of one of the guests, Joseph Chiasson, were present.

Shortly after, Vail learned from the hotel valet, Philias Thériault, that rioters were hiding in André Albert's house. The sheriff ordered his assistant, Stephen Gable, to lead a group of twenty men, including John Blackhall who serves as an interpreter, to storm the house. It was three o'clock in the afternoon. Blackhall questioned André Albert, who denies the presence of rioters. Meanwhile, Stephen Gable and some men entered the house while the others remained outside to prevent the occupants from escaping. A constable pointed his rifle at Clothilde as she got up to remove boiling water from the stove, causing her to faint. The two women were then taken to a nearby room. A noise from the second floor caught Robert Ramsay's attention, prompting him to fire a warning shot into the ceiling to "scare those hiding there." Richard Sewell reacted, exclaiming, "The sons of bitches are up there!" and rushed to the attic with Henry Burbridge. The occupants blocked their entry. In response, other constables attempted to remove the ceiling planks with their rifles. Two shots were fired from the attic, but no one was injured.

John Gifford managed to sneak into the attic with the help of Richard Sewell and George Loggie. Gifford was shot in the face and died instantly after firing a single shot. The exact sequence of events is unclear, but it appears that shots were fired through the ceiling for several minutes. Amid the chaos, Agapit Albert successfully escaped from the attic, while Stanislas Albert was subdued by a constable as he attempted to flee. Constables eventually reached the attic and put an end to the shooting. Bernard Albert was thrown down but managed to hide under a bed, sustaining cuts on his fingers and a wound on his forehead. Joseph Duguay, who was injured in the face, was arrested on the spot. Louis Mailloux, who was wounded in the head, was left for dead as constables apprehended the rioters.

=== Immediate reactions ===
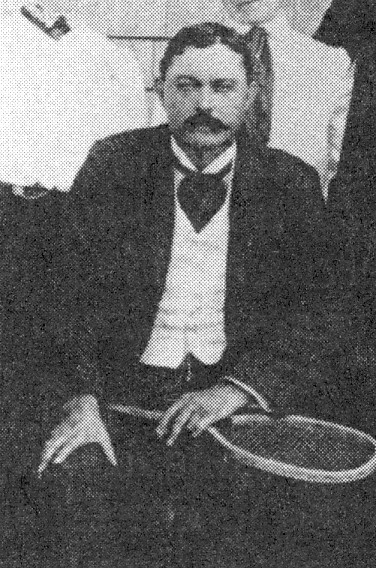
Colson Hubbard, who identified some of the rioters and allegedly sent a threatening letter to parish priest Joseph Pelletier. Photograph from 1904.

The 14 arrested rioters are taken to Young's store, which serves as a temporary prison, except for one who is left behind due to severe injuries and will receive treatment the next day. Later, the constables permit the retrieval of Louis Mailloux's body. He is still alive but passes away three-quarters of an hour later, during the night of January 28. The prisoners are then transported to Bathurst. Upon arrival, several of them have frostbite on their feet, and one of the horses dies.

Upon receiving news of the shooting in Bathurst, Senator John Ferguson and two other justices of the peace quickly mobilized the militia of Chatham to support the police. On January 28, Major R. R. Call led two officers and 41 gunners from the Newcastle field battery to Bathurst, arriving at 9:30 pm. They were accompanied by two large caliber cannons. Additionally, a detachment of four officers and 46 men from the 73rd Infantry Battalion departed Chatham on January 28 and were expected to reach Bathurst by 5 p.m. the following day.

On January 30, it was decided that the artillery corps would remain in Bathurst. Only the infantry would go to Caraquet to assist the constables, and they arrived the next morning.

Louis Mailloux's funeral will be held on February 2nd. On the same day, John Gifford will be buried in Newcastle. All the shops in the city will be closed, and 1,000 people are expected to attend his funeral.

== Political reactions ==
=== First bill ===
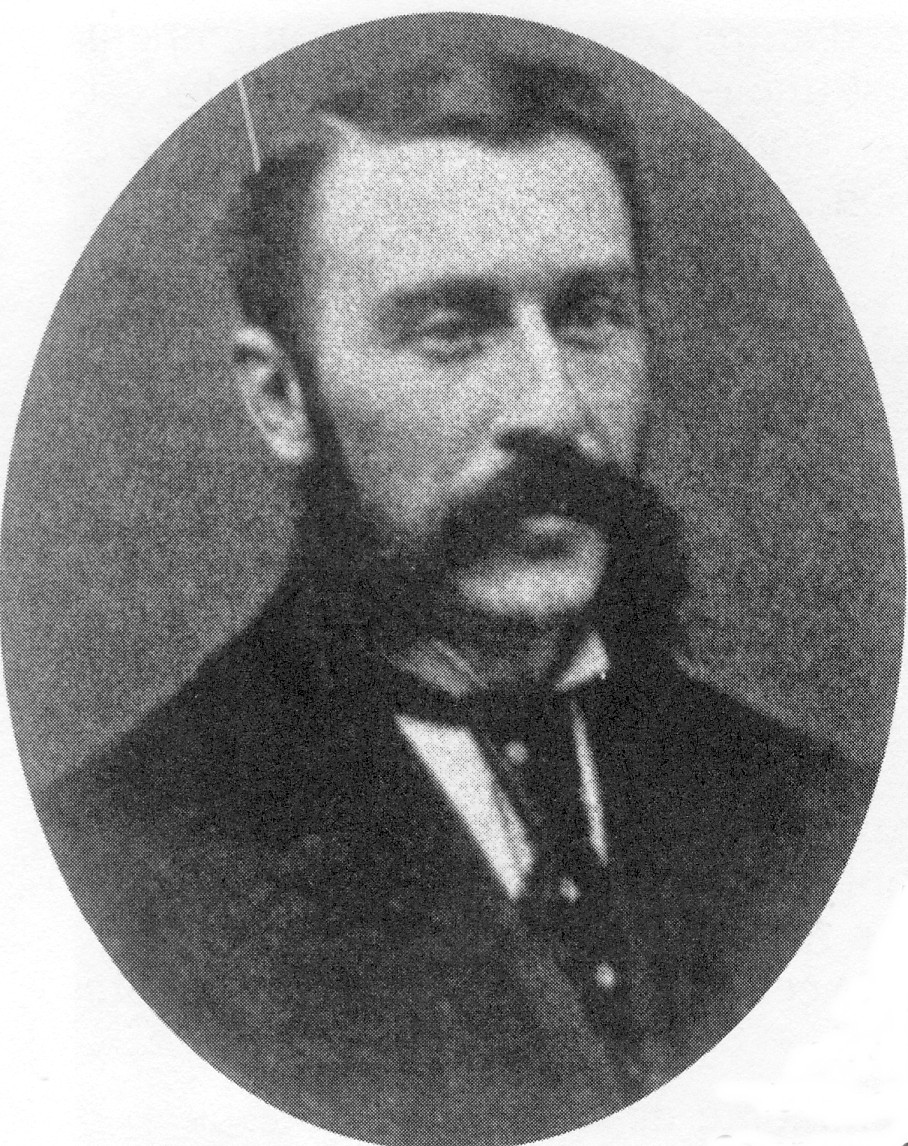
Théotime Blanchard in 1875.

The riots were not explicitly mentioned when the Legislative Assembly resumes on February 20, 1875. However, Deputy H. O'Leary from Kent County described the law as an insult, which was refuted by the Prime Minister. On March 8, Théotime Blanchard introduced a bill to legalize the deliberations and appointments made at the public meeting held in November in Caraquet. This proposed law would invalidate the meeting of January 4, 1875, and the appointment of the Anglo-Protestant trustees. Introduced on March 9, 1875, the bill sparked a debate, with Minister Fraser accusing Blanchard of being responsible for the riots. Despite Blanchard's defense, the bill is ultimately rejected.

=== Assassination attempt ===
On March 18, 1875, Théotime Blanchard was traveling from Caraquet to Fredericton when he was targeted in an assassination attempt. Near Néguac, a disguised assailant, posing as a woman, shot at him, narrowly missing his head. The perpetrator was never apprehended.

=== Second bill ===
On April 8, the provincial government introduced a bill proposing the construction of a prison in Caraquet and the establishment of a permanent police station in the area. Deputy Kennedy Francis Burns presented a petition with 15,000 signatures opposing the law, suspecting it to be influenced by Robert Young.

After the attack on him and the shock of Louis Mailloux's death, Théotime Blanchard becomes more outspoken, even stating that "the Bismarcks and Kaisers of Gloucester did not have to bring the Prussian army to Caraquet."

The bill was adopted despite opposition from only 4 deputies: Henry O'Leary, Urbain Johnson, Kennedy Burns, and Théotime Blanchard.

== Bathurst trial ==
=== Procedures and funding ===
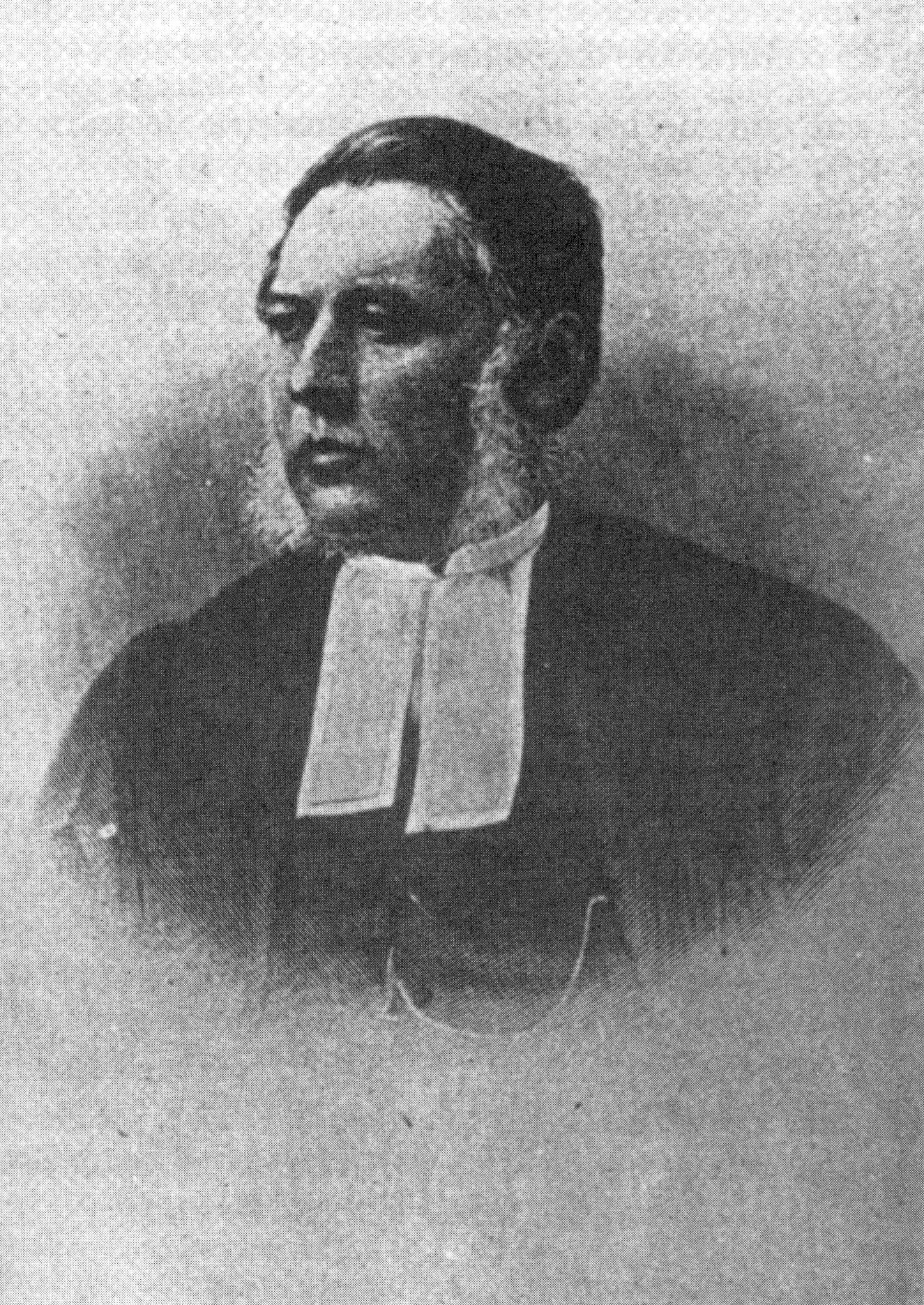
Judge John C. Allen.

Joseph Sewell's investigation was swift. The coroner's report by Dr. G.M. Duncan of Bathurst concluded that Mailloux was fatally shot in the head by an unidentified person with a pistol. According to the coroner's inquest of Dr. S.L. Bishop, Gifford was hit by 29 shotgun pellets.

Vail and his men arrested a total of 25 prisoners (Note: Gustave Lanteigne, Éloi Lanteigne, Joseph Duguay, Sinaï Paulin, Gédéon Albert, Prudent Albert, Louis Parisé, Gervais Chiasson, Fabien Lebouthillier, Joseph Lebouthillier, Phillias Mailloux, Luc Albert, Bernard Albert, Gustave Gallien, Jean-Louis Chiasson, Joseph Lebouthillier, Joseph Chiasson, Jean-Louis Paulin, Moïse Parisé, Gervais Lanteigne, Stanislas Albert, Xavier Chenard, Pierre Frigault, André Albert, and Agapit Albert.) who were then taken to Bathurst. Following a coroner's inquest held between January 29 and February 2, all but one, Gervais Chiasson, were charged with participating in a riot. Gervais Chiasson was mistakenly identified as Gervais Lanteigne. Nine of the prisoners were released on bail, and no charges were filed in connection with the murder of Louis Mailloux.

Onésiphore Turgeon suggested French Canadian Joseph-Adolphe Chapleau as the defense attorney, who had a strong reputation and later became the Prime Minister of Quebec in 1879. Chapleau had previously defended Ambroise Lépine, a companion of Louis Riel during the Red River Rebellion, in a trial for the murder of Thomas Scott, which had similarities to the current case. Despite Chapleau's acceptance and permission from the New Brunswick Bar, objections from Father Joseph Pelletier and Deputy K. F. Burns arose, citing concerns that appointing a Québécois would further antagonize the Anglophone population in the province. As a result, Chapleau's nomination was rejected, and Samuel Robert Thompson, an Irish-born resident of Saint John, was appointed instead. Thompson agreed to work with Pierre-Amand Landry from Memramcook, and lawyers Adams and McManus from Bathurst. Father Pelletier formed a committee to raise funds, but their efforts were unsuccessful. Pascal Poirier was then tasked with collecting funds from Quebec patriots; with the support of Nazaire Dupuis from Montreal and Reverend Lory, they organized successful fundraising events to gather the necessary funds.

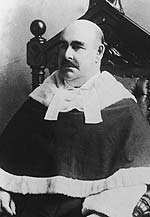
Prime Minister and Attorney General, George Edwin King.

The trial is scheduled to begin on September 7, 1875, with Judge John C. Allen presiding. The Crown's case is presented by Attorney General and Prime Minister George E. King, while Sheriff Vail presents the evidence to a grand jury consisting of 23 members. (Note: Robert Good, Richard P. Smith, Angus McLean, John E. Baldwin, Richard Hinton, James Thompson, Michael Kent, O.D. Turgeon, Charles Carter, Albert Carter, Samuel Gammon, Richard Dawson, Frederick Cole, Francis Farney, George Coughlan, George W. Dawson, Hilarian Hachey, William Smith, Hugh Chalmers, Joseph Kent, William Hillock, James Chalmers, and John O'Brien served as members of the jury with John O'Brien as the jury president.)

The judge displays a harsh attitude towards the accused, and two days later, on September 9, the grand jury indicts Joseph Chiasson, Bernard Albert, Luc Albert, Agapit Albert, Stanislas Albert, Prudent Albert, Joseph Dugay, Sinaï Paulin, and Moïse Parisé for the murder of John Gifford. The following day, the grand jury also indicts Louis Chiasson, Gustave Gallien, Gervais Lanteigne, Jean L. Paulin, Phillias Mailloux, Fabienn Lebouthillier, Joseph Lebouthillier, and Pierre Frigault for the riot on January 15. Charges related to the January 25 riot at Robert Young's are rejected, despite George E. King's insistence. All the accused plead not guilty, and those without sufficient evidence are released.

=== Riot Trial ===
The riot trial was set to begin on September 17, with the defense attorney requesting the dismissal of the indictment due to four irregularities. These included the bias of Sheriff Vail and the connections between some grand jurors and constables. The objections were dismissed the following day, but the judge took note of these issues for future reference. Thompson then delayed the selection of the petit jury, raising concerns about family relationships and Sheriff Vail consulting Robert Young before summoning jurors. Finally, a petit jury of 12 members (Note: Robert Anderson, Isaac Chamberlain, John Legresley, John Horton, Thomas Gasnelle, Thomas Nowlan, Éloi Comeau, Basil Doucet, Joseph Morrisson, Gustave Dumas, Romain Doucet, and Patrick D. McCulough.) were assembled on September 24.

In the following days, the Crown calls 22 witnesses to the stand, while the defense calls 11. The only consistent detail among the testimonies is the consumption of alcohol. Thompson presented his plea for two hours on October 4, stating that no riot could be proven. King followed with a three-and-a-half-hour argument, asserting that the accused spread terror. The jury found the accused guilty. The judge scheduled the sentencing announcement for July 1876 and required a $1,200 bond for the release of the guilty parties. Thompson announced his intention to appeal the verdict.

=== Murder trial ===
The murder trial of John Gifford is set to commence on October 29, with a new petit jury being formed. The accused enter pleas of not guilty, and the judge announces that they will be tried separately. Thompson indicates that he will challenge the court members individually. The selection process for the petit jury proves to be challenging and concludes with the final selection of 12 members (Note: Hugh Barclay, Alex Morrisson, Alex McCurdy, Edwin Mills, Thomas Hodnett, John Armstrong, James Morrisson, Richard Knowles, William Dempsey, William Jennings, John Dempsey, and Samuel Smith were present.) on November 8. In contrast to the previous trial, this jury consists entirely of Protestants.

The Crown's strategy is to establish a connection between the events of January 15 and 25, suggesting that the individuals hiding in André Albert's attic were anticipating the arrival of the constables. In contrast, the defense argues that the constables initiated the gunfire and that John Gifford acted in self-defense. Over a two-week period, the Crown presents its witnesses, including Constable Robert Ramsay, who claims to have fired the first shot, supporting the defense's argument. However, other constables contradict Ramsay's testimony. Constable Sewell admits to killing Louis Mailloux, but the judge dismisses defense questions on this matter during cross-examination. The defense witnesses, starting on November 21, include Pierre Thériault, a neighbor of André Albert, who heard three or four shots from outside. Most witnesses state they did not intend to resist but fired out of fear when confronted by the constables.

During Agapit Albert's interrogation on December 3, tension escalated between Thompson and D.S. Kerr, the Deputy Attorney General. Kerr eventually insulted Thompson, leading the judge to find him in contempt of court and impose a $50 fine.

The lawyers presented their final arguments on December 6. The following day, the jury president, Alex Morrisson, announced that Joseph Chiasson had been found guilty of murder. Kerr suggested to Thompson, the defense attorney, that the other 8 accused plead guilty to manslaughter, which would allow the trial to proceed to the New Brunswick Supreme Court. Thompson agreed to the proposal. Prudent and Luc Albert were released due to their young ages, being 16 and 18 years old, respectively. Joseph Chiasson is required to remain in prison until sentencing.

== Supreme Court trial ==
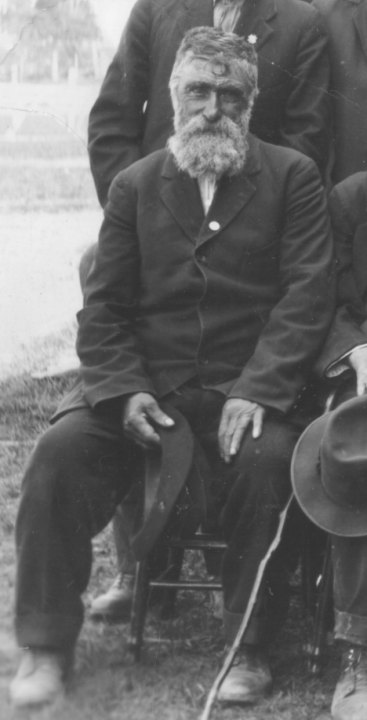
Joseph Chiasson in 1927, the main defendant in the case. Université de Moncton, Centre d'études acadiennes.

During the proceedings, Judge Allen was appointed Chief Justice of the Supreme Court. He will preside over an appeal related to the two trials he previously handled. The trial was scheduled to begin in February 1876 but was adjourned because defense attorney Thompson was absent.

=== Loss of support ===
Support for the accused wanes as key figures distance themselves. Timothy Anglin, known for his defense of Catholics during the New Brunswick School Question, was elected Speaker of the House of Commons of Canada in 1874, leaving him unable to participate in the ongoing debate. Théotime Blanchard, disheartened by the unfolding events, resigned from his seat in the Legislative Assembly at the end of 1875 to take on the role of Inspector of Weights and Measures in the northern part of the province. The Bishop of Miramichi instructs Joseph Pelletier to leave the city, leading him to become the parish priest of Saint-François-de-Madawaska. Kennedy Francis Burns, who had taken Blanchard's place in the Gloucester seat in 1874, remains the sole political supporter of the accused.

=== Expense scandal ===
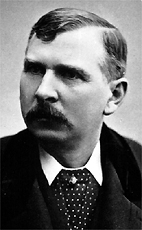
K.F. Burns.

On March 4, 1876, Kennedy Francis Burns requested that documents related to the expenses incurred during the riots be presented in the Legislative Assembly. The revelations caused a significant uproar. The total cost of maintaining the order amounted to $9,728.17, a substantial sum for that period. Notably, $2,121.99 was paid to Robert Young, including $215.25 for telegraph services. The English-language newspapers Saint John Daily News, Advance, and Telegraph received detailed reports on the events in Caraquet. The government also earned $101.71 from the auction of seized rifles, with four of them originating from André Albert. Burns persistently sought justifications for these expenses, while other members suggested referring to the Auditor general's report for 1875. Frustrated by the lack of information, he eventually abandoned his pursuit.

=== Trial resumption ===
Hearings would resume in March. The first case, R. v. Mailloux et al., involved the riot that occurred on January 15. Thompson argued that several grand jury members were ineligible due to their family ties to the constables. He also challenged the judge's ruling to exclude evidence from a school meeting on January 14. The appellants claimed that the meeting explained their visit to Blackhall on January 15, stating they intended to continue a meeting adjourned by Blackhall and did not intend to break the law. The Court rules that including ineligible persons on a grand jury does not invalidate its decision under the Jury Act. It also states that intent to commit an illegal act can be inferred from the nature of the actions, such as obtaining signatures through threats and the circumstances of Blackhall's resignation. The guilty verdict for the riot is upheld.

The second trial, R. v. Chiasson, was an unusual and complex procedure. In this case, the appeal heard by the court was filed by the Chief Justice himself. The Court examines 48 points from Joseph Chiasson's first trial. It concluded that the Crown, represented by George E. King, had the right to strike certain persons from the jury list – in this case, all Catholics – by the Statutes of Canada, 32 and 33, Vic., c. 29, art. 38–41. The second set of points concerned allegations of bias from certain members of the petit jury. The Court concluded that although it is possible to challenge the participation of some members, there is no valid evidence to support allegations of bias. Finally, the most important of the three categories relates to the admissibility and rejection of certain evidence. During the first trial, Judge Allen had rejected the evidence supporting the defense. The judges, including Allen, acknowledge that many of these pieces of evidence could have been admitted. They also agree that the events of January 15 should not have been used as evidence supporting the prosecution. Furthermore, they agree that the Court should have heard from the others in the attic with Joseph Chiasson to determine whether they were there to resist arrest or because they were frightened.

The Supreme Court has ordered the dismissal of charges and the halt of prosecution for the murder of John Gifford. Additionally, Joseph Chiasson and the individuals who sought refuge with him in the attic have been declared not guilty. The judges have also decided not to impose a sentence for the guilty verdict related to the riot on January 15, considering the time that has passed since the events.

== Press role ==
The English-speaking and Protestant newspapers, such as News, Advance, and Telegraph, supported the government, while The Morning Freeman, a Catholic Irish English-language newspaper, and Le Moniteur Acadien, sided with the people of Caraquet. The Morning Freeman, owned by Timothy Anglin, Gloucester's deputy during the New Brunswick School Question, was particularly outspoken in its defense, even more so than Le Moniteur Acadien.

== Caraquet after the incident ==
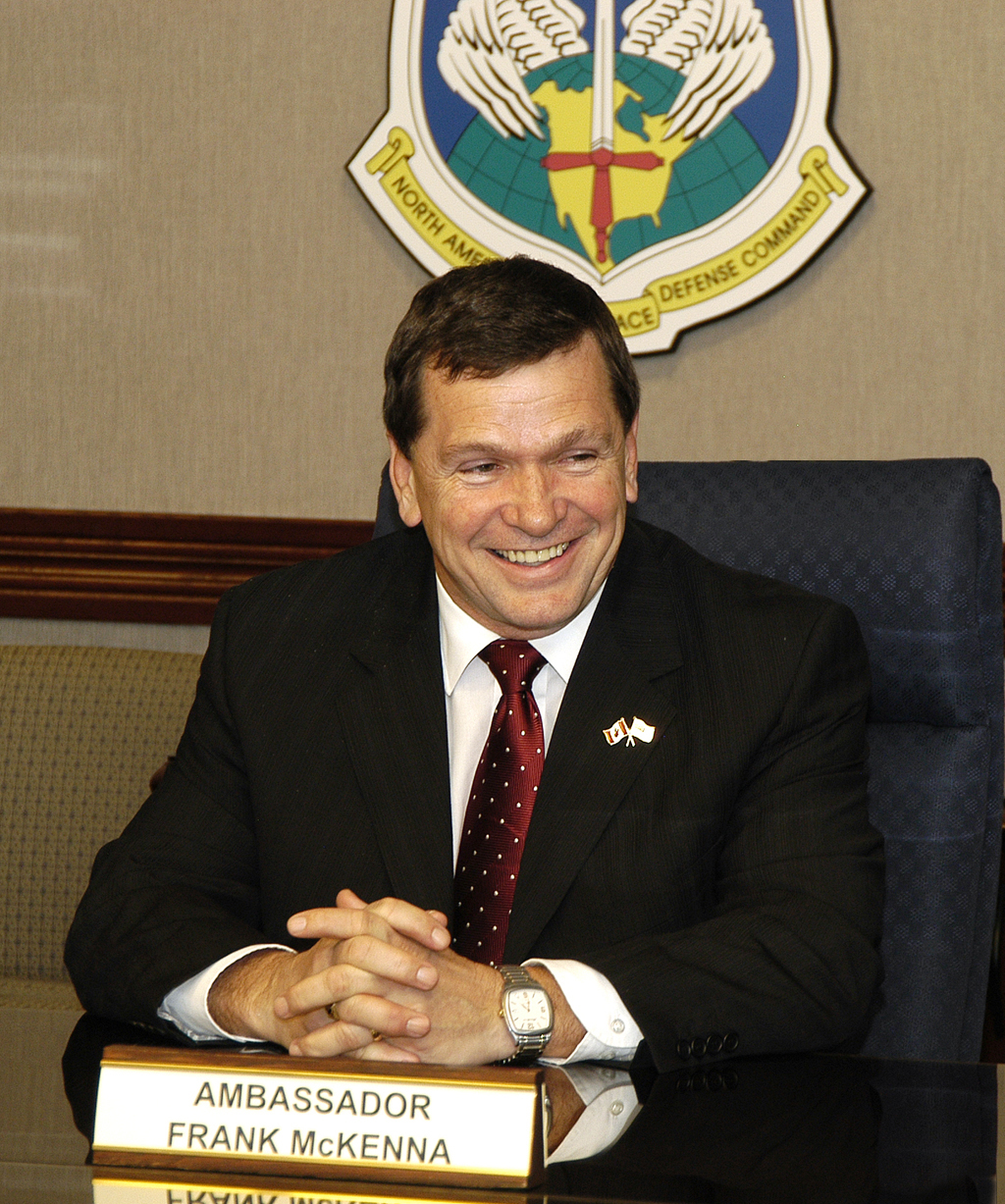
More than a century after the Affair, the words of Frank McKenna and Jane Barry have shocked the public.

Joseph Pelletier was replaced as parish priest of Caraquet in 1876 following the Louis Mailloux affair.

After the riots, James Blackhall left Caraquet for Montreal. The population continued to do business with Robert Young. His son Frederick T. B. Young, his grandson Frederick G., and Doug Young, another descendant, were all elected to the provincial or federal parliament.

The street where the shooting occurred is now known as Patriots' Street. André Albert's house no longer exists, but in 1986, the Patriots Tribute monument was inaugurated at that location. It consists of a granite stele flanked by two Acadian flags and bears the inscription "TRIBUTE TO THE PATRIOTS – HERE, on January 27, 1875, a group of patriots, including Louis Mailloux, revolted against the application of the King Law, which prohibited the teaching of religion at school." A street in the Le Bouthillier neighborhood, where most of the fishermen from Caraquet and protagonists in the riots came from, is named in honor of Louis Mailloux. The city's high school also bears his name.

In 1997, the Saint-Sauveur and Saint-Simon riots occurred when parents protested the closure of their school and were met with force by the Royal Canadian Mounted Police. Jane Barry, New Brunswick's Solicitor General, caused controversy in the Legislative Assembly by suggesting that the people of the Acadian Peninsula resort to violence to achieve their goals, alluding to past incidents like the Caraquet riots. The Caraquet City Council demanded public apologies from her. Prime Minister Frank McKenna "had previously remarked on a history of rebellion or violence in the Acadian Peninsula when their wishes do not go their way." In 2007, Member of Parliament Paul Robichaud introduced a motion for an apology in the Legislative Assembly. Education Minister Kelly Lamrock requested changes to the text, removing any mention of apologies and references to Frank McKenna and Jane Barry.

2025, the 150th anniversary of the event, was declared the "Year of Louis Mailloux" in Caraquet, and the event was commemorated with activities created to inform younger generations of the event and its importance in local history.

== The Louis Mailloux case in culture ==
Among English Canadians, John Gifford's death had a similar impact as that of Thomas Scott.

Louis Mailloux is considered a national hero among Acadians.

In 1929, James Branch, a New Brunswicker, created the play "Long Live Our Catholic Schools! or the Caraquet Resistance," which was the first to focus on the events of 1875. The play centers around the character of Louis Mailloux, depicted as impulsive and prone to trouble. It portrays a generational conflict, with the older generation aligning with Father Pelletier's criticism of the youth's actions.

In 1967, Calixte Duguay wrote Le Vieux Majorique, a short story recounting the story of Louis Mailloux. This was shortly after the song Louis Mailloux was released. The Parti acadien was founded in 1972 during the peak of Acadian nationalism. Duguay, who was closely associated with the party, collaborated with Jules Boudreau to write the play Louis Mailloux, which premiered in 1975 to commemorate the centenary of the shootout. The play has been revised and staged multiple times since its original presentation.

A verse from the song Chanter ma vie by Wilfred LeBouthillier indirectly references the incident:

“It is not that nothing happened just because it was ignored. In my village of Caraquet, on the night of January 27th."

Prisoners brought back blue potatoes from Bathurst, which are still grown in Caraquet and are nicknamed "prison potatoes" for this reason.

In 2025, the event was declared as a national historic event by the government of Canada.

== Histography ==
Many articles and books have been written on the question of schools in New Brunswick, but few specifically address the Louis Mailloux case.

In Un tribut à la race acadienne, the first memoir published in Acadia in 1928, Deputy Onésiphore Turgeon dedicates a chapter to the case. William Francis Ganong briefly mentions it in his two articles, History of Caraquet and Pokemouche, published in 1907. Corinne Albert-Blanchard addresses the issue in 5 pages in Caraquet: Quelques bribes de son histoire (1967). However, J. Antonin Friolet devotes 9 pages to it in Caraquet: Village au soleil (1978), while Clarence LeBreton and Bernard Thériault do the same in 1981 in Caraquet 1961–1981: du plus long village du monde à la plus longue rue des maritimes.

In 1992, Clarence LeBreton published a book titled L'affaire Louis Mailloux after five years of research. However, the book received criticism for its presentation, spelling errors, and disputed historical facts. Consequently, the publisher decided to withdraw it from the market, leading LeBreton to resign from his position as a professor at the Shippagan campus of the University of Moncton. On July 26, 2002, Francophonie Editions reissued the book as La révolte acadienne in honor of National Acadian Day. The revised edition featured corrected text and additional documents. Editor Denis Sonier emphasized the book's historical significance, stating, "It's too important to be forgotten." The reissued book gained popularity and was available in New Brunswick, 60 Quebec bookstores, and Paris.

== See also ==
=== Bibliography ===
Specialist literature

- LeBreton, Clarence (2002). La Révolte acadienne – 15 janvier 1875 (in French). Moncton: Éditions de la Francophonie. ISBN 2-923016-03-3.
- LeBreton, Clarence (1991). Le Collège de Caraquet : 1892-1916. Acadie (in French). Montreal: Éditions du Fleuve. ISBN 2-89372-023-4.

General literature

- Albert-Blanchard, Corrine (1967). Caraquet : quelques bribes de son histoire (in French). Caraquet: Comité du centenaire de Caraquet.
- Friolet, J. Antonin (1978). Caraquet, village au soleil (in French). Fredericton.
- Ganong, William Francis (1948). he history of Caraquet and Pokemouche. Saint-Jean, New-Brunswick: New Brunswick Museum.
- LeBreton, Clarence; Thériault, Bernard (1981). Caraquet 1961–1981: du plus long village du monde à la plus longue rue des maritimes (in French). Caraquet.
- Thériault, Fidèle (1985). Les familles de Caraquet (in French). Caraquet.

Press articles

- Chiasson, Euclide (September 1, 1992). "Propos divers avant l'hiver". Le Devoir (in French).
- Gallien, Mgr Arthur (February 1934). "Un épisode de la lutte pour la religion à l'école : L'émeute de Caraquet". L'Évangéline (in French): 3.
- Hubert, Jean (August 1961). "Émeute de Caraquet". Maclean's (in French): 28, 46–48.
- Landry, N.A (February 1934). "Les émeutes de Caraquet". L'Évangéline (in French): 3.
- LeBreton, Clarence (1982). "Les Blackhall". Revue d'histoire Société historique Nicholas-Denys (in French). 10 (2): 39–48.
- Léger, Médard J (September 26, 1959). "Quelques détails au sujet de l'émeute de Caraquet". L'Évangéline (in French).
- Mailhot, Raymond (October 8, 1971). "Un événement, le Caraquet Riot". L'Analyse (in French): 1.
- Pariseau, Jean (1972). "Émeute – Questions des écoles du Nouveau-Brunswick". Revue canadienne de défense (in French). 2 (1): 30–45.
- Stanley, George F (1972). "The Caraquet Riot of 1875". Acadiensis (in French). II (1): 21–38.
- Thériault, Fidèle (March 24, 1972). "The Caraquet Riot of 1875". Acadiensis (in French). II (1): 1, 3.

Theater plays

- Duguay, Calixte; Boudreau, Jules (1994). Louis Mailloux (in French). Moncton: Éditions d'Acadie. ISBN 2-7600-0258-6.
- Branch, James E (1928). Vive nos écoles catholiques ou la résistance de Caraquet (in French). Moncton: Imprimerie l'Évangéline.

=== Related articles ===
==== Celebrities ====
- John Campbell Allen
- Théotime Blanchard
- Kennedy F. Burns
- William Moore Kelly
- George Edwin King
- Pierre-Amand Landry
- Pierre Joseph Pelletier
- Onésiphore Turgeon
- Robert Young

==== Events ====
- List of incidents of civil unrest in Canada
- Common Schools Act of 1871

=== External links ===
- "Écho d'un peuple, exposition virtuelle – L'affaire Louis Mailloux: Héros malgré lui" (in French). Archived from the original on July 27, 2021.
