= New Brunswick Teachers' Federation =

Canadian trade union and professional association

- Abbreviation: NBTF
- Formation: 1970; 56 years ago
- Type: Trade union; professional association
- Headquarters: Fredericton, New Brunswick, Canada
- Location: New Brunswick, Canada
- Members: 8,400 (2022)
- Official languages: English; French
- Co-presidents: Nathalie Brideau; Connie Keating
- Executive director: Kerry Leopkey
- Website: nbtffenb.ca

The New Brunswick Teachers' Federation (NBTF; French: Fédération des enseignants du Nouveau-Brunswick [FENB]) is a Canadian trade union and professional association representing 8,400 schoolteachers in New Brunswick. Teachers join the federation through one of its two constituent professional organizations: the New Brunswick Teachers' Association (NBTA), which represents anglophones, or the Association des enseignantes et des enseignants francophones du Nouveau-Brunswick (AEFNB), which represents francophones. The federation was founded in 1970, prior to which all teachers belonged to the NBTA.

== History ==
The New Brunswick Teachers' Association (NBTA) was founded on 15 November 1902 as the Albert County Teachers' Association. Its name was changed to the New Brunswick Teachers' Union on 4 June 1903. Several months later, at the organization's first convention, it adopted its current name on 22 December 1903 in an effort to eschew the typical approach of labour unions in favour of "develop[ping] along the lines of a professional association".

== See also ==
- Education in New Brunswick
