= Education in New Brunswick =

The education system of New Brunswick comprises public and private primary and secondary schools and post-secondary institutions. By the British North America Act, 1867 (part of the constitution of Canada), education falls entirely under provincial jurisdiction. There is no federal government department or agency involved in the formation or analysis of policy regarding education. Also by constitutional right, Roman Catholics are entitled to their own school system; this led in New Brunswick to contention in the early years of the nation, and, in 1871, to the first case sent from Canada to the Judicial Committee of the Privy Council, Maher v Town Council of Portland.

Publicly funded elementary and secondary schools are administered by the Ministry of Education and Early Childhood Development, while colleges and universities are administered by the Ministry of Post Secondary Education, Training and Labour.

== History ==
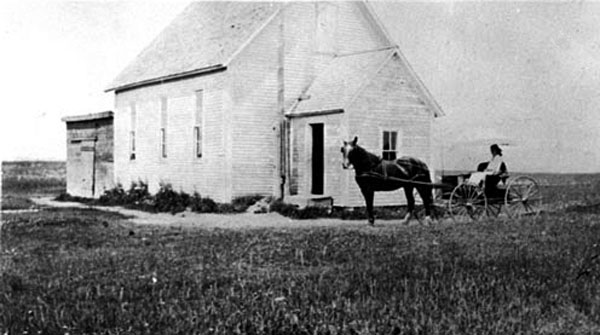
One-room schoolhouse at Wakem Corner.

As higher education in New Brunswick is summarized on a separate page, the text below relates primarily to primary and secondary education.

From the year of the scission of the province from Nova Scotia, 1784, until 1802 there was no law in New Brunswick about government-funded education. In 1802, an Act to enable Parish Schools to be funded publicly was passed by the Assembly. Later on, in 1805 and again in 1816 Grammar Schools were enabled; it seems that the Grammar School (and its attached funding) was available only to county shire towns. The Parish Schools, which were permitted only elementary education, were initially controlled by the Justices of the Peace; later they fell under Parish School trustees. By contrast, the Grammar Schools by fiat from the first had instituted boards of governors and were responsible for both elementary and secondary education. Grammar Schools were to teach English Grammar, Latin, Greek, Orthography, Geography, and Mathematics. The 1816 Act granted each Board £100, provided that the local contribution was at least £50. Neither Parish nor Grammar schools were free at this time, however regulations mandated that a small number of students (usually four or five) were to be admitted free of charge. The first schools in the province were often only one-room schoolhouses. After 1833, school boards were required to divide their territory into districts, and £20 per district school was granted by the province if the work were considered satisfactory. The local voters were taxed to fund the other £20 of district expenditure.

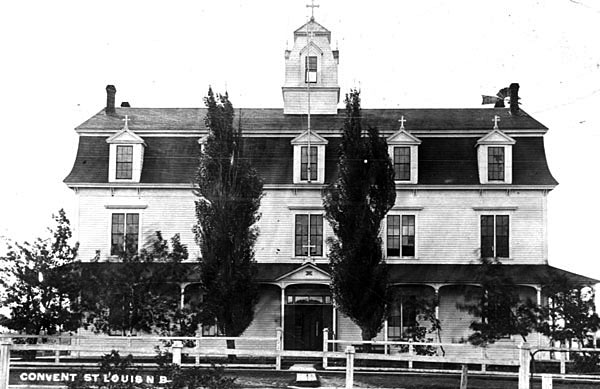
Roman Catholic Convent school at St.-Louis-de-Kent in 1910.

The churches were of course free to operate schools without interference from the government. This occurred in a great number of places; the Catholic church in particular constructed prominent and grandiose buildings, such as the Convent at St.-Louis-de-Kent depicted at right. The Catholic church, not being restricted by mundane things like taxes and electors, could afford to establish residential schools wherever it seemed propitious. The Anglican Church in New Brunswick operated, from about 1820 until at least 1870, "Madras Schools" along the lines drawn by Andrew Bell. The Anglican system was useful, notes a biographer of Bell, "when funds were sparse and teachers in very short supply."

Prior to the establishment in 1848 of the Teacher Training School, the appointment (in rural areas at least) of a new master to a position of provincially governed responsibility included the certification of (as the case was) the local magistrate and/or board of trustees that the candidate was known to them to be of good character and repute, and that he could carry out his duties in a proper fashion. Two property owners in the neighbourhood seem also to have served as witnesses, upon which the Lieutenant-Governor appointed the candidate. The budget seems to have been paid in arrears at mid-year or at year-end on a satisfactory report of progress from the supervisors.

A significant fraction of the rural schoolhouses were privately owned, and presumably leased to the authorities.

In 1847, the syllabus at one Grammar School was: Science, History, Geography, Arithmetic, Bookkeeping, Grammar, and Latin.

The first Teacher Training School in the province was not established until 1848.

A Superior School teacher earned in 1858 roughly £125 a year. Superior Schools, one per Parish, were established in that year apparently so that residents would engage competent teachers. The Superior School teacher designation was obtained from the Teacher Training School. Principals of such schools were required to have an additional qualification for Latin and for Mathematics.

Whereas formerly the Grammar Schools operated under the supervision of local Boards of Trustees, they were placed in 1861 under the supervision of the provincial Chief Superintendent of Schools, who at this date was named Bennet. At this time, the number of Grammar Schools in operation in the province was twelve, and the sum of $300 was paid by the province to a one-room schoolhouse teacher.

Superintendent Bennet was pleased to note that parallel rows of hardwood-topped desks facing the teacher's rostrum and blackboard had replaced the old system of pine desks with backless benches arranged around the periphery of the schoolroom. Bennet made his case for larger schools, in which graded levels would be the norm, whereby a greater number of teachers could further specialise their lessons. Bennet would go on to chafe against the instruction of Latin grammar as a means to teach that of the English, although the former means of instruction would prevail for many years to come.

A new set of regulations was instituted in 1863. These included that 1) the Master of a County Grammar School be degreed or have a certificate of qualification issued by the provincial Board of Education; 2) the school have no less than 150 cubic feet of air per pupil; 3) the school have "all necessary appurtenances"; 4) the school required at least 15 pupils aged 10 years or more; 5) at least five of whom were to study Latin, Greek and Mathematics, and ten of whom were to study English Composition and History.

The Free Schools Act of 1871 added to the taxpayer's burden the cost of the education system. The Common Schools Act, also of 1871 (CSA), established a whole new system in the province; the place of religion in the school system was a topic of debate as early as 1863, and this Act was its ostensible solution: schools became non-sectarian. Opposition was directed at Sections 14 through 18, which concerned the levy of taxes on all private property throughout each (newly ordained) district, and Section 60, in which a non-sectarian system was specified. The grammar schools were allowed until 1884 to operate independently. Schools were financed from three sources: 1) school district poll tax on all male inhabitants of the district above 21 years of age; 2) school district property tax (real or personal) and income tax applied to non-residents' and residents' property alike; 3) County School fund tax equal to 30 cents per inhabitant according to the previous census.

The debate over the place of religion in the schools came to a head in 1875. Section 5 of the CSA allowed the provincial board of education to make regulations. In the programme of studies (under Regulation 16) no mention was made of the teaching of religion, while under Regulation 20 "no symbols or emblems distinctive of any religious organization" could be employed or exhibited "in the school room or on the person of any teacher or pupil". But Regulation 21 allowed the teacher to open and close the daily exercises by reading a portion of Scripture and by offering the Lord's Prayer. Any other prayer could, with the permission of the Board, be employed. Roman Catholic citizens were especially concerned over Regulation 20. Civil disorder broke out in January 1875 over this regulation, and two men lost their lives in Caraquet.

By 1876, a high school principal earned a yearly stipend of $500.00.

In 1893, New Brunswick Supreme Court Justice John James Fraser was commissioned by Lieutenant-Governor Samuel Leonard Tilley to investigate complaints related to the "School Law or Regulations" in Gloucester County. Some Protestant ratepayers were very concerned that the Catholic administrators of the Bathurst Grammar School had infringed them, especially the non-denominational nature of the School Law. One item of complaint was that the catechism was taught using school facilities during lunch hour; another, that the application of a Protestant teacher had been discarded without good reason by the administration; and several others. The Commissioner found, after a very full investigation, that no blame could be attached to the Board of Education.

Since the Compulsory Attendance Act of 1940, children have been required to attend classes; parents otherwise faced fines. In contrast, the US state of Mississippi in 1918 was the last state to enact a compulsory attendance law.

School buses were not seen in great numbers until the early 1960s.

Since the government of Louis Robichaud during the 1960s, and especially the New Brunswick Official Languages Act (1969), attention on group educational rights has turned toward the linguistic variety.

An Act Recognizing the Equality of the Two Official Linguistic Communities in New Brunswick was passed in 1981 by the government of Premier Richard Hatfield. It provided independent school boards for both linguistic groups. Its principles were later expanded and incorporated into the Constitution of Canada, through the insertion of section 16.1 in 1993 under the government of Frank McKenna:

16.1 (1) The English linguistic community and the French linguistic community in New Brunswick have equality of status and equal rights and privileges, including the right to distinct educational institutions and such distinct cultural institutions as are necessary for the preservation and promotion of those communities. (2) The role of the legislature and government of New Brunswick to preserve and promote the status, rights and privileges referred to in subsection (1) is affirmed.

Until 28 December 1997, New Brunswick had under the Schools Act, publicly funded school boards which were led by elected representatives and which had been administered at arm's length from the provincial Department of Education. On that date the Education Act was written in the 53rd New Brunswick Legislature to replace the Schools Act.

As of September 2012, the Government of New Brunswick decided to merge and rename all the school districts changing the number of districts from fourteen to seven. By doing this, Jody Carr, then the province's minister of education, estimated that $5 million per year would be saved in administrative costs. At the time, New Brunswick had a total of 321 schools, which were filled on average to less than 60 per cent of capacity. School council members were to be paid $3,000 a year, while council chairpeople would get $6,000 annually. Carr stated that in the previous decade, the number of students in the province had dropped by 15 per cent while the costs to operate schools had increased by 37 per cent.

In 2012, the Programme for International Student Assessment (PISA) test for 15 year-olds showed that the scores in reading ability for both the anglophone and francophone systems in New Brunswick were the lowest in Canada, and that overall New Brunswick students finished below the Canadian average in math.

In 2013, the Council of Ministers of Education, Canada sponsored a test called the Pan-Canadian Assessment Program, which was administered to a sample of more than 32,000 Grade 8 students from across the country. "Level 2 was designated as the acceptable level of performance for Grade 8/Secondary II students." The lowest proportion, 87%, of students meeting "level 2" in the science test was found in New Brunswick while the scores of the students in the science test were, on a statistically significant basis, much lower than the Canadian average. The reading and mathematics tests gave similarly poor results for New Brunswick. Students were asked, for example, "to classify substances according to their physical properties, and to describe how the movement and tilt of the Earth affects cycles such as years, days and seasons".

New Brunswick lengthened its school day by 30 minutes early in the oughties in hopes of improving its academic performance, and in recent years some school districts ended "potato break", a two-week break that allowed students to work during the fall potato harvest. As a result, the province now has the longest school year in the country, at more than 1,000 hours for high school students, according to Statistics Canada. Yet its students scored below average among Canadian provinces on 2014 international math tests.

New Brunswick ranked 22nd among the 26 comparator jurisdictions in the 2014 Conference Board of Canada How Canada Performs study. Overall, it rated a "D", while both student and adult math, literacy and science skills rated very poorly.

School buses have become an issue of contention since at least the year 2000. In that year, the Supreme Court of Canada (SCC) decided in Arsenault-Cameron v. Prince Edward Island that the by-population French-speaking minority of Summerside PEI could exercise their Section 23 Charter right to native-language local education. The analysis of this decision by Ministry staff posits that separate-by-language buses must be operated along with separate-by-language schools, and such has been applied. In the 2014-15 school year, New Brunswick budgeted to spend $64.8-million in order to bus 90,000 students; or in other words, $720 for each student. The Progressive Conservative Party of New Brunswick's only Acadian MLA in March 2015 threatened to split from the party if discussion were re-opened on school bus re-unification. However, the SCC decision at paragraph 61 states that "The Appeal Division erred in... concluding that buses could be considered educational facilities." Tristin Hopper, a journalist for the National Post observed in 2015 that it "would appear to place [schoolbuses] outside the realm of the Charter", which deals in Section 23 with "minority language educational facilities." Still and all, NB Attorney-General and at the time Minister of Education Serge Rousselle mandated his department to eliminate a unified schoolbus service arrangement that had developed organically in Richibucto.

The Assessment Framework document gives a key to the Ministry's province-wide standardized tests. The 2016 results were released in October 2016.

On 17 November 2016, the Gallant government backpedalled and withdrew its reference case on the constitutionality of bilingual school buses, and said it would leave the issue in the hands of District Education Councils (DECs, see below). A new policy to be implemented by the province would state that the DECs' remit would include the ability to decide whether they 1) operated their own transportation services; 2) shared costs of this service between Francophone and Anglophone districts; 3) engaged the private sector for these services.

On 22 November, the CBC NB Morning TV show hosted a number of students who complained that the policy on "inclusive classrooms" wasn't working and was hurtful to their lives and future well-being.

=== Policy 713 ===
Policy 713, an educational policy which ensured a safe and welcome public school environment for LGBTQIA2S+ youth in the province, became effective in August 2020.

In May 2023, the Department of Education and Early Childhood Development put the policy under review due to "concerns and misunderstandings of its implementation." As a result of a small protest being held due to a sexual orientation and gender identity learning session for teachers, Bill Hogan, the department minister, denied department involvement in the session and redirected questioners to contact the New Brunswick Teachers' Association.

== See also ==
- Higher education in New Brunswick
- List of schools in New Brunswick
- Sacré-Cœur College
