= Peter Veniot =

Canadian politician

Peter John Veniot
- Peter J. Veniot as Postmaster General

18th Premier of New Brunswick
- In office February 28, 1923 – September 14, 1925
- Monarch: George V
- Lieutenant Governor: William Pugsley; William Frederick Todd
- Preceded by: Walter E. Foster
- Succeeded by: John B. M. Baxter

MLA for Gloucester
- In office November 5, 1894 – January 6, 1900 Serving with Allister F. Bentley, John Sievewright, Prosper E. Paulin
- Preceded by: Théotime Blanchard
- Succeeded by: John Young
- In office February 24, 1917 – September 14, 1926 Serving with James P. Byrne, Ivan Rand, John B. London, Seraphine R. Léger, Jean George Robichaud, J. André Doucet
- Preceded by: John B. Hatchey
- Succeeded by: Clovis-Thomas Richard

Member of the Canadian Parliament for Gloucester
- In office September 14, 1926 – July 6, 1936
- Preceded by: Jean George Robichaud
- Succeeded by: Clarence Joseph Veniot

Personal details
- Born: October 4, 1863 Richibucto, New Brunswick, British North America
- Died: July 6, 1936 (aged 72) Bathurst, New Brunswick, Canada
- Party: Liberal
- Spouse: Catherine Melanson (m. 1885)
- Children: 6 sons
- Education: Pictou Academy
- Occupation: businessman and newspaper owner
- Profession: politician

Peter John Veniot, PC (October 4, 1863 – July 6, 1936) was a businessman and newspaper owner and a politician in New Brunswick, Canada. He was the first Acadian premier of New Brunswick.

== Early life and career ==
He was born in Richibucto, New Brunswick but later moved to Pictou, Nova Scotia with his family. Veniot worked as a journalist and typographer for the Pictou Standard and then the Moncton Transcript. He then moved to Bathurst, where he became editor and later owner of Le Courrier des Provinces Maritimes.

== Political career ==
Veniot was first elected to the Legislative Assembly of New Brunswick in 1894, but left politics in 1900 for a customs job. In 1912, he was hired to reorganize the Liberal Party of New Brunswick, and became a Member of the Legislative Assembly (MLA) again in 1917.

He served in the cabinet of Premier Walter Foster as Minister of Public Works. As Minister, Veniot was responsible for the creation of the New Brunswick Electric Power Commission and the modernization of the province's highway system.

Veniot became Premier in 1923 following Foster's resignation. He was a supporter of the Maritime Rights Movement or Duncan Commission, which advocated more power for the Maritime provinces in Canadian Confederation. His government was defeated in the 1925 provincial election.

Veniot resigned as provincial Liberal leader in 1926 in order to enter federal politics in the 1926 federal election. He served as Postmaster General in the cabinet of William Lyon Mackenzie King. In cabinet, Veniot advocated implementation of the Duncan Commission recommendations on alleviating Maritime alienation. Recommendations of freight-rate reductions and subsidy increases were implemented, but suggestions for subsidies based on fiscal need and transportation use to encourage regional development were ignored.

== Death ==
Veniot remained a Member of Parliament until his death at his home in Bathurst in 1936.

== Personal life ==
Married in 1885 to Catherine Melanson, their son Clarence Joseph was elected in the federal riding of Gloucester by-election after his death. He and his wife are interred in Bathurst, in the cemetery adjacent to the offices of the newspaper that made his fortune.

== Electoral record ==
1935 Canadian federal election: Gloucester
Party	Candidate	Votes	%	±%
Liberal	Peter Veniot	11,816	74.96	+24.12
Conservative	Albany Robichaud	2,962	18.79	-30.37
Reconstruction	Hector Poirier	985	6.25	
Total valid votes		15,763	100.00	

1930 Canadian federal election: Gloucester
Party	Candidate	Votes	%	±%
Liberal	Peter Veniot	7,716	50.84	-4.95
Conservative (istorical)	Albany Robichaud	7,460	49.16	+4.95
Total valid votes		15,176	100.00	
Source: lop.parl.ca

By-election on 2 November 1926 On Peter Veniot's acceptance of an office of emolument under the Crown, 5 October 1926
Party	Candidate	Votes
Liberal	Peter Veniot	Acclaimed
