= Common Schools Act of 1871 =

Controversial provincial school law in New Brunswick

The Common Schools Act of 1871 was a statute of the Canadian Province of New Brunswick, passed by the 22nd New Brunswick Legislature. The statute replaced the Parish Schools Act of 1858. It abolished church-run schooling in New Brunswick and replaced them with a system of government-run "common schools." The case of Maher v. Town Council of Portland was initiated as a result, and in the end, the Judicial Committee of the Privy Council upheld the Act. The Act was stridently opposed by the Roman Catholic Church and its adherents, and a series of clashes between New Brunswick Catholics and the provincial government culminated in the shooting of two people following riots at Caraquet in 1875, after which the Act was substantially amended to implement a joint religious/secular schooling system.

== Background ==
Since 1858, education in New Brunswick had been governed by the Parish Schools Act of 1858. It organized all New Brunswick schools under a provincial Board of Education but made no provision for the government to own or establish schools. As a result, the impetus to found new schools was required to originate at a local level, and in practice, most schools were established and operated by churches (particularly, Roman Catholic and Anglican), with the church then receiving a share of the province's education budget in return. In the diocese of Saint John, for example, there were some 160 Catholic schools operating by 1871, many staffed by professed religious, with a significant minority of them offering instruction in French. There were no standardized texts, and teachers had complete freedom in their choice of curriculum. Of those priests and professed religious acting as teachers, the majority had no formal teaching credentials. Attendance at schools was enforced by teachers and parents, with no government intervention.

By 1871, the New Brunswick government had begun to have substantial doubts about the system of education. It was skeptical about the quality of education begin delivered, and it was also concerned about attendance rates, with school attendance in the area of Gloucester falling as low as 55%.

=== Education reform throughout Canada ===
By 1871, several Canadian provinces had already implemented provincially run public schooling systems, and others were considering it. In Ontario, Egerton Ryerson had fought for secularization as a means of keeping power out of the hands of any church, and from 1844 as Chief Superintendent of Education for Upper Canada, he had instituted significant reforms l, leading to the creation of a strong state-run education system. In Nova Scotia, Premier Charles Tupper had successfully introduced public schooling through his Free School Act of 1864. Lemuel Allan Wilmot, a former New Brunswick Attorney-General and in 1871, its lieutenant governor, had been an outspoken advocate for the creation of a unified taxation-funded public school system in New Brunswick for many years.

=== Ultramontanism ===
During the years leading up to 1871, a key conflict within the Roman Catholic Church concerned the authority of the Pope over secular governments. The doctrine of ultramontanism asserted that the Pope held supreme authority over all matters spiritual and secular, and it was vigorously pursued by key members of the Roman Catholic Church in Canada, most notably Ignace Bourget, Bishop of Montreal from 1840 to 1876.

In 1864, Pope Pius IX published the Syllabus of Errors, a document collecting several past papal reasonings and presented as a list of "condemned propositions" such as modern liberalism, the supreme power of human reason, the teaching of philosophy and natural science as fields distinct from religion, and, at some considerable length, the separation of church and state. The syllabus specifically reaffirmed the right of priests to interfere in and direct the course of temporal affairs as well as the supremacy of religious law over civil law. Proposition 45 of the Syllabus rejected the right of civil governments to exercise sole dominion over the teaching of children.

At the same time, reform-minded governments gaining power throughout Canada were becoming frustrated by church conservativism, and they were keen to lessen their dependence on church infrastructure and mitigate the power wielded by the Vatican in Canadian political affairs.

== Development of Act ==
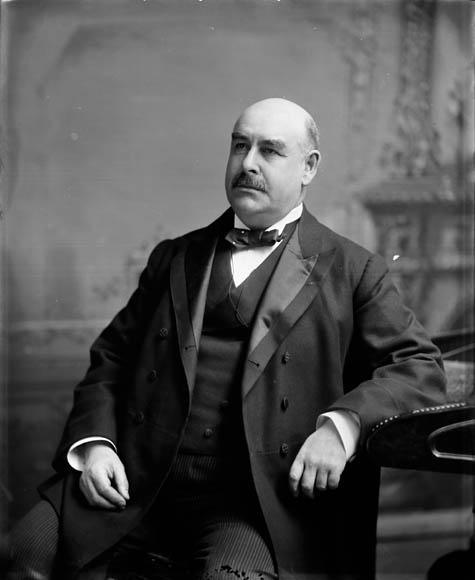
George E. King (1839-1901), the principal architect of the Common Schools Act

During the closing sittings of the 21st New Brunswick Legislative Assembly in 1870, a key issue was reform of the New Brunswick school system. George Edwin King, then an MLA on behalf of the electorate of Saint John County and City, had been, since 1868, developing a bill to create a state-run school system to provide free education to all New Brunswick children. King's bill was tabled in 1870 but failed to receive support and eventually, King withdrew it.

However, in June 1870, New Brunswick's Premier Andrew Rainsford Wetmore retired from politics to accept a position on the Supreme Court, and King was able to seek and receive appointments as the new Premier and Attorney-General. He revived his Common Schools Bill and campaigned on it at the 1870 election. He was successfully returned to office and took leadership of the 22nd New Brunswick Legislative Assembly.

However the new government proved unstable, and in February 1871, King lost the confidence of parliament and was forced to resign. George Luther Hatheway took up the mantle of Premier, with King as his Attorney-General. While Hatheway and King were opposed on many political issues, they were united in their support of public schooling, and on April 12, 1871, King reintroduced his Common Schools Bill to parliament on behalf of Hatheway's government.

== Enactment ==
King's bill prompted a long and bitter debate in the New Brunswick parliament. Members opposed to the bill included most of the parliament's Catholics, some Anglicans, and also some members against compulsory assessment. On May 5, 1871, free school supporters proposed an amendment to the bill making schools under the Act be non-sectarian. The amendment was passed by a 25-10 vote. The bill, as a whole, was passed on May 17, 1871 and it was signed into law as the Common Schools Act of 1871.

The Act came into effect on January 1, 1872. It contained various provisions that had the effect of shutting down religious schooling in New Brunswick. While teachers were permitted to open and close school with Bible reading and the Lord's Prayer, they were prohibited from the teaching of catechism courses and from wearing religious garb, and schools were forbidden from displaying religious symbols. Control of the school system was given to the Executive Council, exercising its power through the New Brunswick Board of Education. The Board of Education held powers under the Act to dictate curriculum and textbook content, require teachers to meet certain standards of qualification, and set the work conditions and employment terms of educators.

== Opposition ==
Bishop John Sweeny led Catholic opposition to the Common Schools Act.

The government claimed that non-denominational, mandatory schooling would improve access to education for New Brunswick's children. However, opponents of the legislation claimed that sole responsibility for the education of children lay with parents, and they resented government interference in what they saw as a parental duty through the imposition of mandatory schooling. Opponents of the legislation were primarily religious organisations including the Anglican Church and the Roman Catholic Church.

Hatheway died in June 1872, and King regained the position of Premier of New Brunswick. King found himself facing strong Roman Catholic opposition to the Common Schools Act, led by Bishop John Sweeny.

The Catholics, under Sweeny, made an appeal to the Canadian federal government in Ottawa, seeking disallowance of the Act. They claimed that Catholic schools had existed under the Parish Schools Act and so Catholics had constitutional rights to sectarian schools under the British North America Act. The appeal did not find any support in the federal cabinet and was unsuccessful. The Catholics then attempted to fight the bill in the federal House of Commons in the spring of 1872. Roman Catholic member for New Brunswick John Costigan presented a motion calling on the government to disallow the New Brunswick Common Schools Act, with the support of fellow New Brunswicker Timothy Warren Anglin, but the motion was defeated on the floor of the House. Similarly, a proposal by Quebec Premier Pierre-Joseph-Olivier Chauveau to ask the Queen to amend the British North America Act to protect sectarian schooling failed to win majority support.

In the final result, the only action taken by the federal government was to seek a constitutional opinion from crown lawyers in London and to call on the New Brunswick government to reconsider its position. King responded to this call some five months later with a 12-page memorandum in which he argued that Catholic public schools had never been legally recognised in New Brunswick and so had not lost any rights or privileges as a result of the legislative change to the schooling system.

Objectors to the Common Schools Act launched a challenge to the Act in the Supreme Court of New Brunswick. In 1873, the court dismissed the objectors' suit and found in favour of the government, but in the course of the case, it levelled several criticisms at the act's assessment clauses, which King's government addressed by passing supplementary retroactive assessment legislation.

Following the failure of the court challenge, New Brunswick Bishop John Sweeny attended the provincial council of the Roman Catholic Church in Quebec on May 18, 1873, and he invited the bishops of Quebec to intervene in the New Brunswick school question. The following day, Ignace Bourget, Bishop of Montreal, and Louis-François Laflèche, of Trois-Rivières, accepted Sweeny's invitation by issuing a prepared statement opposing the Common Schools Act in the name of the Roman Catholic Church. The statement had the effect of inciting several federal Catholic MPs to break ranks from the government over the issue. At roughly the same time, New Brunswick MP John Costigan moved a motion on the floor of the House of Commons requesting for the governor-general to disallow the New Brunswick acts relating to assessment for local schools. The motion was successful, but Prime Minister John Alexander Macdonald refused to disallow the legislation. Facing revolt in his own ranks over the issue, Macdonald agreed to pay $5,000 towards the costs of an appeal to the Judicial Committee of the Privy Council (then Canada's highest court) by the New Brunswick Catholics. In 1874, the Judicial Committee gave its decision in Maher v. Town of Portland, ruling that the Common Schools Act was constitutional and did not infringe the guarantees for denominational schools set out in section 93 of the Constitution Act, 1867.

During the legislative and parliamentary challenges, Catholics, organized by their bishops, resisted the implementation of the Common Schools Act at a grassroots level by refusing to pay school taxes. The provincial government responded by imprisoning priests and seizing the property of tax evaders. Also many refused to send their children to the state-run schools, especially in Gloucester and Madawaska counties.

In late 1873, King held meetings with Sweeney to seek a compromise. Sweeny offered to bring an end to the Catholic opposition in return for the government under conditions, but the Executive Council refused his offer. By 1874, the debate was still continuing in the New Brunswick Legislative Assembly and growing more bitter. At the last sitting of the before the 1874 election, the Assembly debated both a proposed amendment to the Common Schools Act and a motion abjuring federal interference in the province's schools. King accused the Catholic opposition of opposing the Act for ultramontanist reasons as part of a long-term Roman Catholic plan for domination of Europe and Canada. King went on to say, "If we once abandon the strong line of defence that is along the heights of equality [...] the end will be the overthrow of our rights and independence of action."

The amendment was defeated 24-12, and the non-interference motion carried by the same margin.

The 1874 New Brunswick election was fought solely over the issue of common schools, with King's government achieving an overwhelming victory, claiming 36 of the 41 seats.

== 1875 Caraquet riots ==
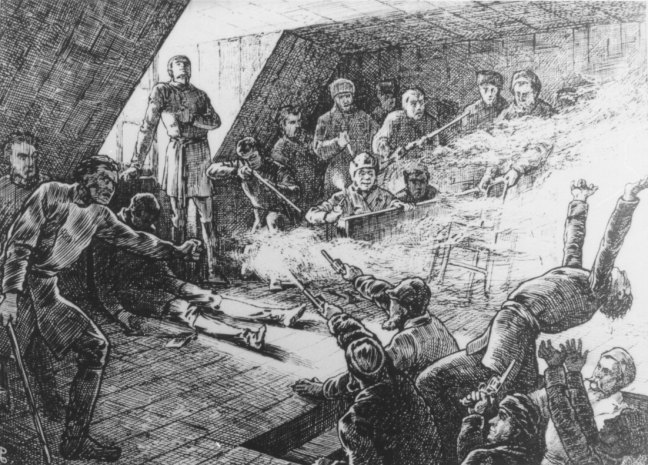
An artist's depiction of the Caraquet shootings, circa 1875

In 1872, Robert Young was appointed as President of New Brunswick's Executive Council, which had ultimate control of the New Brunswick school system under the terms of the Common Schools Act. A particular priority for Young was implementing the Common Schools Act in Gloucester County. Gloucester County, which included Young's home town of Caraquet, had mainly Acadians (descendants of French colonists) and was strongly Roman Catholic.

Young faced deeply entrenched opposition to the Act in Gloucester. In 1873, Gloucester magistrates refused to enforce the provisions of the Act. Young responded by having them replaced. At the 1874 elections, although only five of the 41 members elected to the Legislative Assembly were not supporters of the Common Schools Act, both of the members elected in Gloucester were in the opposition. Gloucester elected Théotime Blanchard and Kennedy Francis Burns, both Catholics who were firm opponents of the act.

The town of Caraquet was opposed to the Common Schools Act and most of its residents had for some time refused to pay the schools tax in protest. In 1874 a meeting was held by the townspeople of Caraquet at which public officials were appointed. Caraquet's small Protestant minority questioned the legality of the appointments, and on January 4, 1875 Young held his own, secret, meeting at which he appointed Protestants to the same positions.

On January 14, 1875, a public meeting was convened with the aim of imposing the school tax on Caraquet. The meeting ended in a scuffle. On January 15, a group of Caraquet Acadians held a public protest against further attempts to apply the Act. During the protest, drunken demonstrators caused property damage to several premises including a store owned by Young. The demonstrators threatened Young's wife and employees.

On January 25, ten police constables bearing arrest warrants arrived in Caraquet to identity and arrest the demonstrators who had damaged Young's store. They were still in Caraquet on January 26, when 20 English-speaking "volunteers," recruited by Young, arrived in the town to assist in the arrests. The "volunteers" gained entry to the house of one André Albert, at which Acadians were gathered, resulting in an exchange of gunfire. One Acadian (Louis Mailloux) and one militiaman (John Gifford) were shot and killed during the exchange. Nine Acadians were tried as accessories to the death of Gifford but were acquitted. Public sentiment in Gloucester held Young responsible for both deaths.

== Amendment ==
The Caraquet deaths brought a realisation to both sides of the school debate that compromise was required on the issue. In the spring of 1875, the Catholic opposition, headed by Kennedy Francis Burns, met with the government to work out what would eventually become substantial amendments to the workings of the Act. The changes, based on proposals originally drafted by Sweeney, were carried out by amendments to the Act's subordinate regulations, and they were kept secret for fear of inviting controversy.

The amendments allowed for a less arduous method of certification for religious teachers in which they would still have to complete examinations but would not have to attend Normal School classes. The determination of textbook content would be made in consultation with the churches, with passages offensive to the church excised. Church-owned school buildings would be permitted to be used, pending the decision by local school trustees to lease them from the church, and religious instruction could occur in such buildings if the regular school day was not shortened for the purpose. The effect of the arrangements regarding church buildings and religious schooling was to limit Catholic education to urban centres and to move further argument back down to the level of the local school boards.

== Legacy ==
The Common Schools Act of 1871 has been suggested as "the most significant piece of social legislation in 19th-century New Brunswick." By 1878, the number of students enrolled in the public school system had more than doubled, and the number of public school teachers had increased by half.

== See also ==
- Theodore Harding Rand

== Sources ==
- Acheson, T.W. (1994). "King, George Edwin". In Cook, Ramsay; Hamelin, Jean (eds.). Dictionary of Canadian Biography. Vol. XIII (1901–1910) (online ed.). University of Toronto Press.
- Bushnell, Ian (1992). The captive court: a study of the Supreme Court of Canada. Montreal; Ithaca: McGill - Queen's University Press. ISBN 0-7735-0851-1.
- Cyr, Jean-Roch (1994). "Young, Robert". In Cook, Ramsay; Hamelin, Jean (eds.). Dictionary of Canadian Biography. Vol. XIII (1901–1910) (online ed.). University of Toronto Press.
- Fay, Terence J. (2002). A history of Canadian Catholics: Gallicanism, Romanism, and Canadianism. Montreal; Ithaca: McGill - Queen's University Press. ISBN 9780773523142. OCLC 48230086.
- Haag, A. (1912). Syllabus. The Catholic Encyclopaedia. New York: Robert Appleton Company.
- Murphy, Terrence (1994). "Sweeny, John". In Cook, Ramsay; Hamelin, Jean (eds.). Dictionary of Canadian Biography. Vol. XIII (1901–1910) (online ed.). University of Toronto Press.
- Snyder, Lorraine; Lambert, Maude-emmanuelle (March 31, 2017) [February 7, 2006]. "New Brunswick School Question". The Canadian Encyclopedia (online ed.). Historica Canada.
- Spray, W.A. (1972). "Hatheway, George Luther". In Hayne, David (ed.). Dictionary of Canadian Biography. Vol. X (1871–1880) (online ed.). University of Toronto Press.
- Sylvain, Philippe (1982). "Bourget, Ignace". In Halpenny, Francess G. (ed.). Dictionary of Canadian Biography. Vol. XI (1881–1890) (online ed.). University of Toronto Press.
- Wilbur, Richard (1989). The rise of French New Brunswick. Halifax: Formac. ISBN 0-88780-070-X.
