= Kennedy Francis Burns =

Canadian businessman and politician

The Hon. Kennedy Francis Burns
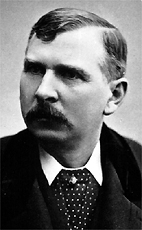

Senator for New Brunswick, New Brunswick
- In office March 21, 1894 – June 23, 1895
- Appointed by: John Sparrow David Thompson

Member of the Canadian Parliament for Gloucester
- In office 1882–1894
- Preceded by: Timothy Anglin
- Succeeded by: Théotime Blanchard

Member of the Legislative Assembly of New Brunswick for Gloucester
- In office 1874–1878

Personal details
- Born: January 8, 1842 Thomastown, Ireland, United Kingdom
- Died: June 23, 1895 (aged 53) Bathurst, New Brunswick
- Party: Liberal (provincially), Conservative (federally)

Kennedy Francis Burns (January 8, 1842 – June 23, 1895) was a Canadian businessman and politician of the Liberal party.

== Biography ==
Born a Roman Catholic in Thomastown, Republic of Ireland, he emigrated to British North America. He worked as a clerk for a merchant at Chatham, New Brunswick and was sent by the same employer to Bathurst, New Brunswick in 1861. There he bought his employer's store in 1863.

On 26 September 1865, Burns married Harriet McKenna.

After he acquired property at a place later known as Burnsville on the Caraquet River, including a hydraulically-powered sawmill, he entered the lumber trade as K. F. Burns and Company. With his brother-in-law Samuel Adams he formed in 1878 the Burns, Adams and Company and built in East Bathurst a steam-powered sawmill, which entered production in 1880. Adams left the company in 1880, and it reverted to its former name. Initially, the company exported its Burnsville lumber from Caraquet to Britain, and then, after the 1885 opening of the Caraquet and Gulf Shore Railway, all lumber was shipped from Bathurst. Burns was the instigator of the C&GS Railway, later serving as its president.

Around 1890, Burns formed the St. Lawrence Lumber Company (SLLC), of which he was President. This company owned at Bersimis, Quebec a sawmill; and amalgamated the mills at Burnsville and Bathurst. It was financed chiefly by Novelli and Co., and when the London financiers went bankrupt in 1894, the SLLC foundered.

Burns died of pneumonia at the age of 53 in Bathurst on 23 June 1895. He left four daughters.

=== Political career ===
Burns was elected to the Legislative Assembly of New Brunswick in 1874 for Gloucester County, serving until 1878. As a Roman Catholic, he opposed the Common Schools Act of 1871 and formed a legal defence fund for the people who had been charged in the wake of the riots and manslaughter at Caraquet over the issue.

He was first elected to the House of Commons of Canada representing the New Brunswick riding of Gloucester in the 1882 federal elections. He was re-elected in the 1887 election and the 1891 election. Burns supported Prime Minister John A. Macdonald’s National Policy, and in turn it led to his rise as railway industrialist.

In 1894, he was summoned to the Senate of Canada. He sat as a Liberal-Conservative and represented the senatorial division of New Brunswick. He served until his death at Bathurst in 1895.

== Legacy ==
After the death of Burns and twinned with the disestablishment of Novelli & Company in March 1894, the Courrier des Provinces Maritimes reported 19 September 1895 that the Sumner Company from Moncton had purchased the SLLC, but two weeks later the same newspaper reported that the English shareholders had rejected the offer of $29,000, in favour of Adams & Co. of New York. Brother-in-law Samuel had combined with his own brother, Thomas D., Patrick J. Burns, Theobald M. Burns and John Flanigan to re-form Adams, Burns and Company. By November 1895 the assets in the county had been settled, and work advanced as planned over the winter of 1895. In 1914 after a period of fluidity in the region's establishment, the Bathurst Power and Paper Company would emerge from the ABC amalgamated together with various local interests. In time, the result would come to be owned by the conglomerate Power Corporation of Canada and later still the Stone Container Corporation, which shuttered it in 2005 because of global overcapacity in the pulp and paper business brought on by the post-millennial trend towards a paperless office and the electronic newsreader.

== Electoral record ==
1891 Canadian federal election: Gloucester
| Party | Candidate | Votes | % | ±% |
|---|---|---|---|---|
| Conservative | Kennedy Francis Burns | 1,943 | 55.29 | -0.83 |
| Liberal | W.A. Landry | 1,571 | 44.71 | +0.83 |
| Total valid votes | | ,3514 | 100.00 | |

1887 Canadian federal election: Gloucester
| Party | Candidate | Votes | % | ±% |
|---|---|---|---|---|
| Conservative | Kennedy Francis Burns | 1,908 | 56.12 | +3.93 |
| Liberal | Narc A. Landry | 1,492 | 43.88 | +20.49 |
| Total valid votes | | 3,400 | 100.00 | |

1882 Canadian federal election: Gloucester
| Party | Candidate | Votes | % |
|---|---|---|---|
| Conservative | Kennedy Francis Burns | 1,205 | 52.19 |
| Conservative | Onésiphore Turgeon | 564 | 24.43 |
| Liberal | Timothy Anglin | 540 | 23.39 |
| Total valid votes | | 2,309 | 100.00 |

== See also ==
- Kennedy Francis Burns – Parliament of Canada biography
