= John A. Young (disambiguation) =

John A. Young (1932–2025) was an American business manager.

John A. Young may also refer to:

- John Andrew Young (1916–2002), American politician from Texas
- John Allan Young (1895–1961), Canadian politician
- John Young (York County, New Brunswick politician) (1854–1934)
