= Onésiphore Turgeon =

Canadian politician (1849–1944)

The Hon. Onésiphore Turgeon
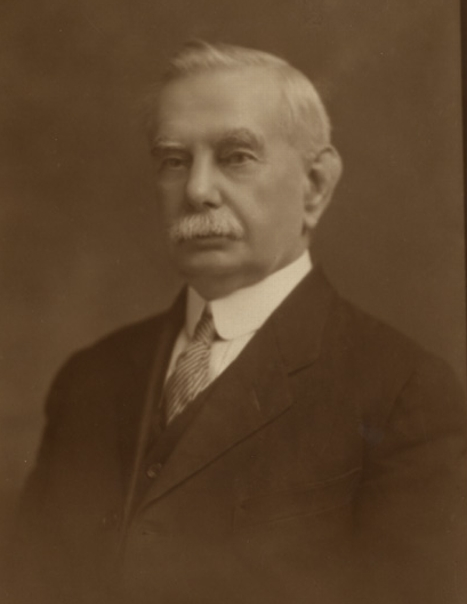

Senator for Gloucester, New Brunswick
- In office October 27, 1922 – November 18, 1944
- Appointed by: William Lyon Mackenzie King

Member of the Canadian Parliament for Gloucester
- In office 1900–1922
- Preceded by: Théotime Blanchard
- Succeeded by: Jean George Robichaud

Personal details
- Born: September 6, 1849 Lévis, Canada East
- Died: November 18, 1944 (aged 95) Bathurst, New Brunswick
- Party: Liberal
- Children: James Gray Turgeon; William Ferdinand Alphonse Turgeon

Onésiphore Turgeon (September 6, 1849 – November 18, 1944) was a Canadian parliamentarian.

Born in Lévis, Canada East, the son of Simon Turgeon and Pélagie Paradis, he was educated at the Séminaire of Quebec and the Université Laval. Turgeon was a journalist in Bathurst, New Brunswick and was editor for Le Courrier des Provinces Maritimes. He was elected to the House of Commons of Canada for the New Brunswick riding of Gloucester in the 1900 election. A Liberal, he would be re-elected in each following election up to and including the 1921 election. He was summoned to the Senate of Canada in 1922 representing the senatorial division of Gloucester, New Brunswick on the advice of William Lyon Mackenzie King. He served in Parliament (both the Commons and the Senate) for 44 years until his death in Bathurst at the age of 95 in 1944.

Turgeon was married twice: to Margaret Eulalia Baldwin in 1876 and to Mary Loretta Meahan in 1905.

His son James Gray Turgeon also served as Member of the House of Commons and the Canadian Senate for many years. His other son, William Ferdinand Alphonse Turgeon, was a Saskatchewan politician and judge.

He was author of Un tribut à la race acadienne. Mémoires, 1871-1927, published in Montreal in 1928.

== Electoral record ==
1921 Canadian federal election: Gloucester
| Party | Candidate | Votes | % |
|---|---|---|---|
| Liberal | Onésiphore Turgeon | 7,671 | 72.97 |
| Conservative | Joseph Edward de Grace | 2,842 | 27.03 |
| Total valid votes | | 10,513 | 100.00 |

1917 Canadian federal election: Gloucester
| Party | Candidate | Votes |
|---|---|---|
| Opposition (Laurier Liberals) | Onésiphore Turgeon | acclaimed |

1911 Canadian federal election: Gloucester
| Party | Candidate | Votes | % | ±% |
|---|---|---|---|---|
| Liberal | Onésiphore Turgeon | 3,172 | 59.27 | +4.06 |
| Conservative | Theobald M. Burns | 2,180 | 40.73 | -4.06 |
| Total valid votes | | 5,352 | 100.00 | |

1908 Canadian federal election: Gloucester
| Party | Candidate | Votes | % | ±% |
|---|---|---|---|---|
| Liberal | Onésiphore Turgeon | 2,581 | 55.21 | -8.53 |
| Conservative | Theobald M. Burns | 2,094 | 44.79 | +8.53 |
| Total valid votes | | 4,675 | 100.00 | |

1904 Canadian federal election: Gloucester
| Party | Candidate | Votes | % | ±% |
|---|---|---|---|---|
| Liberal | Onésiphore Turgeon | 2,705 | 63.74 | +3.78 |
| Conservative | Théotime Blanchard | 1,539 | 36.26 | +2.14 |
| Total valid votes | | 4,244 | 100.00 | |

1900 Canadian federal election: Gloucester
| Party | Candidate | Votes | % | ±% |
|---|---|---|---|---|
| Liberal | Onésiphore Turgeon | 2,311 | 59.96 | +30.14 |
| Conservative | Théotime Blanchard | 1,315 | 34.12 | -16.81 |
| Independent | R. Carr Harris | 228 | 5.92 | |
| Total valid votes | | 3,854 | 100.00 | |
