= John Meahan =

Canadian politician (1806–1902)

John Meahan (May 1, 1806 – August 14, 1902) was an Irish-born shipbuilder and political figure in New Brunswick. He represented Gloucester County, New Brunswick in the Legislative Assembly of New Brunswick from 1862 to 1870.

He was born in Omagh, County Tyrone, the son of James Meahan and Sarah McTaggart, and came to New Brunswick in 1833. In 1841, he married Mary Donnelly. Meahan established in Bathurst a shipbuilding business which built four ships, two barques, two brigs and two brigantines, which were among the largest ships built in Gloucester County. Meahan was opposed to New Brunswick becoming part of Canada. In 1867, he was an unsuccessful candidate for a seat in the Canadian House of Commons.

1867 Canadian federal election: Gloucester
| Party | Candidate | Votes | % |
|---|---|---|---|
| Liberal | Timothy Anglin | 1,061 | 61.26 |
| Unknown | John Meahan | 671 | 38.74 |
| Total valid votes | | 1,732 | 100.00 |
Source: Canadian Elections Database
