= Serge Cormier =

Canadian Liberal politician

Serge Cormier MP

Parliamentary Secretary to the Minister of Immigration, Refugees and Citizenship
- Incumbent
- Assumed office January 30, 2017
- Minister: Ahmed Hussen
- Preceded by: Arif Virani

Member of Parliament for Acadie—Bathurst
- Incumbent
- Assumed office October 19, 2015
- Preceded by: Yvon Godin

Personal details
- Born: 1976 (age 49–50) Maisonnette, New Brunswick, Canada
- Party: Liberal
- Spouse: Isabelle Thériault
- Profession: Political assistant

Serge Cormier MP (born 1976) is a Canadian Liberal politician, who was elected to represent the riding of Acadie—Bathurst in the House of Commons of Canada in the 2015 federal election.

== Early life ==
Cormier was born and raised in Maisonnette, New Brunswick. His father was an inshore fisherman.

== Career ==
He studied business administration, financing his studies by acquiring a small company. He later worked for the government of New Brunswick as the chief of staff to various government departments, and then as a policy analyst for Brian Gallant in both the office of the Official Opposition and of the Premier of New Brunswick. He served as an advisor to Gallant with responsibility for northern New Brunswick. He worked as a riding organizer for both the federal and provincial Liberal parties.

On April 27, 2015, he was nominated to be the federal Liberal candidate in Acadie—Bathurst for the 2015 election. The riding had been held by Yvon Godin of the New Democratic Party since 1997, but Godin opted to retire rather than seek re-election, and Cormier ran against Jason Godin. He won the election, in what was considered an upset victory, as the Liberals swept the Atlantic provinces.

Cormier was re-elected in the 2019 federal election.

== Personal life ==
Cormier lives with his partner Isabelle Thériault, member of the Legislative Assembly and cabinet minister in New Brunswick, and also with his two daughters, and his step-son.

== Electoral record ==
2025 Canadian federal election: Acadie—Bathurst
Party	Candidate	Votes	%	±%	Expenditures
Liberal	Serge Cormier	32,556	67.48	+2.52	$41,361.97
Conservative	James Brown	12,541	25.99	+12.14	$8,497.18
New Democratic	Ty Boulay	2,108	4.37	−6.88	$1,474.38
People's	Randi Rachelle Raynard	1,043	2.16	−3.71	$2,779.40
Total valid votes/expense limit		48,248	98.78	–0.04	$122,145.33
Total rejected ballots		594	1.22	+0.04	
Turnout		48,842	70.40		
Eligible voters		69,373			
Liberal notional hold		Swing		−4.81	
Source: Elections Canada
Note: number of eligible voters does not include voting day registrations.

2021 Canadian federal election: Acadie—Bathurst
Party	Candidate	Votes	%	±%	Expenditures
Liberal	Serge Cormier	27,817	64.81	+9.67	$0.00
Conservative	Jean-Paul Lanteigne	5,916	13.78	–7.72	$0.00
New Democratic	Mélissa Hébert	4,906	11.43	–3.04	$10,937.29
People's	Kenneth Edward Langford	2,531	5.90	N/A	$2,507.48
Green	Rachel Johns	1,203	2.80	–6.08	$0.00
Free	Richer Doiron	549	1.28	N/A	$148.67
Total valid votes/expense limit		42,922	100.00	–	$105,427.37
Total rejected ballots		511	1.18	–0.70	
Turnout		43,433	64.78	–8.76	
Eligible voters		67,052			
Liberal hold		Swing		+8.70	
Source: Elections Canada

2019 Canadian federal election: Acadie—Bathurst
Party	Candidate	Votes	%	±%	Expenditures
Liberal	Serge Cormier	26,547	55.14	+4.43	$52,739.13
Conservative	Martine Savoie	10,352	21.50	+13.94	none listed
New Democratic	Daniel Thériault	6,967	14.47	−24.93	none listed
Green	Robert Kryszko	4,277	8.88	+6.55	$0.00
Total valid votes/expense limit		48,143	100.0		$100,608.92
Total rejected ballots		924	1.88	+1.23	
Turnout		49,067	73.54	−3.25	
Eligible voters		66,718			
Liberal hold		Swing		−4.76	
Source: Elections Canada

2015 Canadian federal election: Acadie—Bathurst
Party	Candidate	Votes	%	±%	Expenditures
Liberal	Serge Cormier	25,845	50.71	+36.40	$55,485.34
New Democratic	Jason Godin	20,079	39.40	-29.68	$116,542.41
Conservative	Riba Girouard-Riordon	3,852	7.56	-8.98	–
Green	Dominique Breau	1,187	2.33	+2.26	–
Total valid votes/expense limit		50,963	99.35		$200,964.43
Total rejected ballots		336	0.65		
Turnout		51,299	77.03		
Eligible voters		66,594			
Liberal gain from New Democratic		Swing		+33.04	
Source: Elections Canada
