= Roger Clinch =

Canadian politician

J. Roger Clinch

Member of Parliament for Gloucester
- In office November 1984 – October 1988
- Preceded by: Herb Breau
- Succeeded by: Doug Young

Personal details
- Born: 8 January 1947 (age 79) Bathurst, New Brunswick
- Party: Progressive Conservative party
- Profession: school administrator and principal

J. Roger Clinch (born 8 January 1947 in Bathurst, New Brunswick) was a Progressive Conservative party member of the House of Commons of Canada. He was a school administrator and principal by career.

Clinch was first elected at the Gloucester electoral district in the 1984 federal election. He lost the PC nomination to former provincial cabinet minister Jean Gauvin for the 1988 federal election.

He served as Chief of Staff to Premier David Alward from September 2013 until October 2014.

1984 Canadian federal election: Gloucester
| Party | Candidate | Votes | % | ±% |
|---|---|---|---|---|
| Progressive Conservative | Roger Clinch | 23,524 | 55.12 | +35.51 |
| Liberal | Herb Breau | 16,378 | 38.38 | -25.29 |
| New Democratic | Valentine Ward | 2,188 | 5.13 | -7.71 |
| Independent | Fernand Losier | 584 | 1.37 | |
| Total valid votes | | 42,674 | 100.00 | |
| Progressive Conservative gain from Liberal | | Swing | +30.40 | |
