= Herb Breau =

Canadian businessman and politician

The Honourable Herb Breau PC

Minister of Fisheries and Oceans
- In office June 30, 1984 – September 16, 1984
- Prime Minister: John Turner
- Preceded by: Pierre de Bané
- Succeeded by: John Allen Fraser

Member of Parliament for Gloucester
- In office June 25, 1968 – September 3, 1984
- Preceded by: Hédard Robichaud
- Succeeded by: Roger Clinch

Personal details
- Born: December 5, 1944 (age 81) Haut-Sheila, New Brunswick, Canada
- Party: Liberal
- Occupation: Business Manager
- Committees: Chair, Special Committee on the Federal-Provincial Fiscal Arrangements (1980-1983); Chair, Special Committee on North-South Relations (1980-1983)
- Portfolio: Parliamentary Secretary to the Minister of Industry, Trade and Commerce (1972-1973); Parliamentary Secretary to the Minister of Energy, Mines and Resources (1974); Parliamentary Secretary to the Secretary of State for External Affairs (1974-1975)

Herb Breau PC (born December 5, 1944) is a Canadian businessman and former politician.

Born in Haut-Sheila, New Brunswick, Breau was a Liberal Member of Parliament (MP) representing Gloucester from the 1968 election until his defeat in the 1984 election that reduced the Liberal caucus to only 40 MPs.

Breau served as a parliamentary secretary in the 1970s. He served as chairman of the Parliamentary Task Forces on North-South Relations and on Fiscal Federalism in Canada, chairman of the Parliamentary Association of Canada-United States from 1977 to 1981, and a member of the Trilateral Commission from 1981 to 1984.

Breau was appointed to Cabinet as Minister of Fisheries and Oceans when John Turner became Prime Minister of Canada in June 1984. His ministerial career ended just over two months later as a result of the election that defeated the Turner government.

He entered the private sector following the end of his political career, and has most recently been an executive at Syscan International, serving as Acting Chief Executive Officer from 2000 to 2001.

Breau served on the board of governors of the International Development Research Centre (IDRC) in the 1990s as an appointee of the federal government.

Breau retired as chair board of directors of the Pearson Centre for Progressive Policy in 2022.

== Electoral record ==
1984 Canadian federal election: Gloucester
Party	Candidate	Votes	%	±%
Progressive Conservative	Roger Clinch	23,524	55.12	+35.51
Liberal	Herb Breau	16,378	38.38	-25.29
New Democratic	Valentine Ward	2,188	5.13	-7.71
Independent	Fernand Losier	584	1.37	
Total valid votes		42,674	100.00	
Progressive Conservative gain from Liberal		Swing	+30.40	

1980 Canadian federal election: Gloucester
Party	Candidate	Votes	%	±%
Liberal	Herb Breau	22,229	63.67	+12.06
Progressive Conservative	Arthur Savoie	6,846	19.61	-19.33
New Democratic	Kevin O'Connell	4,484	12.84	+3.39
Rhinoceros	Jules César Boudreau	736	2.11	
Rhinoceros	Amédé "le Terrible" Boucher	362	1.04	
Independent	Rose-Hélène Aubé	197	0.56	
Marxist–Leninist	Gary Zatzman	59	0.17	
Total valid votes		34,913	100.00	
Liberal hold		Swing	+15.7%	
lop.parl.ca

1979 Canadian federal election: Gloucester
Party	Candidate	Votes	%	±%
Liberal	Herb Breau	18,387	51.61	-5.44
Progressive Conservative	Gastien Godin	13,872	38.94	+15.79
New Democratic	Kevin O'Connell	3,366	9.45	+3.51
Total valid votes		35,625	100.00	

1974 Canadian federal election: Gloucester
Party	Candidate	Votes	%	±%
Liberal	Herb Breau	16,195	57.05	+6.44
Progressive Conservative	Gérard Arseneau	6,571	23.15	-1.47
Social Credit	Lomer Basque	3,935	13.86	-2.12
New Democratic	Yvon Guignard	1,685	5.94	+4.08
Total valid votes		28,386	100.00	

1972 Canadian federal election: Gloucester
Party	Candidate	Votes	%	±%
Liberal	Herb Breau	14,212	50.61	-4.42
Progressive Conservative	Paul Duval	6,914	24.62	-15.81
Social Credit	Lomer Basque	4,487	15.98	Ø
Independent	Percy W. Cormier	1,109	3.95	
Independent	Mathilda Blanchard	839	2.99	
New Democratic	Joe Corbin	521	1.86	-2.68
Total valid votes		28,082	100.00	

1968 Canadian federal election: Gloucester
Party	Candidate	Votes	%	±%
Liberal	Herb Breau	12,196	55.03	-5.58
Progressive Conservative	Frédéric Arsenault	8,960	40.43	+13.17
New Democratic	Florian Robichaud	1,007	4.54	-7.59
Total valid votes		22,163	100.00	
