= Clarence Joseph Veniot =

Canadian politician (1886–1977)

Clarence Joseph Veniot (February 9, 1886 – March 7, 1977) was a physician, surgeon and political figure in New Brunswick, Canada. He represented Gloucester in the House of Commons of Canada from 1936 to 1945 as a Liberal member and then served in the Senate of Canada representing Gloucester division from 1945 to 1966.

He was born in Moncton, New Brunswick, the son of former Premier of New Brunswick Peter Veniot and his wife, Catherine Melanson.

Clarence Veniot served as mayor of Bathurst from 1933 to 1935. He was first elected by acclamation to the House of Commons in a 1936 by-election held after his father's death.

== Electoral record ==
1940 Canadian federal election: Gloucester
Party	Candidate	Votes	%	±%
Liberal	Clarence Joseph Veniot	10,451	65.74	-9.22
National Government	Albany Robichaud	5,447	34.26	+15.47
Total valid votes		15,898	100.00	

The "National Government" was the temporary name of the Conservative Party for the 1940 elections, and changes from 1935 are based on the results of the Conservative Party.

Note: Change in popular vote is calculated from popular vote in the 1935 general election.

By-election on 17 August 1936 On Peter Veniot's death, 6 July 1936
Party	Candidate	Votes
Liberal	Clarence Joseph Veniot	acclaimed
