= Acadie—Bathurst =

Federal electoral district in New Brunswick, Canada

New Brunswick electoral district
- Interactive map of riding boundaries from the 2025 federal election
- Coordinates: 47.573°N 65.506°W

Federal electoral district
- Legislature: House of Commons
MP
Serge Cormier
Liberal
- District created: 1867
- First contested: 1867
- Last contested: 2025
- District webpage: profile, map

Demographics
- Population (2016): 77,791
- Electors (2025): 69,204
- Area (km²): 5,063.17
- Pop. density (per km²): 15.4
- Census division(s): Gloucester, Restigouche
- Census subdivision(s): Tracadie, Bathurst, Belle-Baie, Caraquet, Hautes-Terres, Île-de-Lamèque, Shippagan, Rivière-du-Nord, Belledune, Pabineau

Acadie—Bathurst (formerly known as Gloucester) is a federal electoral district in New Brunswick, Canada, that has been represented in the House of Commons of Canada since 1867.

Historical population
Year	Pop.	±%
2001	76,392	—
2006	78,948	+3.3%
2011 (2005 rep.)	77,792	−1.5%
2011 (2013 rep.)	79,340	+2.0%
2016 (2013 rep.)	77,791	−2.0%

== Geography ==
The district includes eastern Gloucester County, and the communities along Nepisiguit Bay. The neighbouring ridings are Madawaska—Restigouche, Miramichi—Grand Lake and Gaspésie—Les Îles-de-la-Madeleine—Listuguj.

== History ==
Created at Confederation in 1867, the electoral district was known as Gloucester until a 1990 Act of Parliament renamed it to its current designation.

After electoral boundary changes in 2003, residents argued that regional interests, particularly linguistic representation, were improperly diluted. The Library of Parliament recounts the Federal Court of Canada's Raîche v. Canada (Attorney General decision:

"The Court held that while the electoral boundaries commission for New Brunswick had been within its right to try keep any variance in the population of electoral districts under 10%, it did not correctly interpret the spirit of the EBRA (Electoral Bounds Readjustment Act) when it failed to consider whether a greater variation in regard of community of interest and regional features would be desirable for any electoral districts. The Court declared invalid the Miramichi and Acadie–Bathurst electoral boundaries."

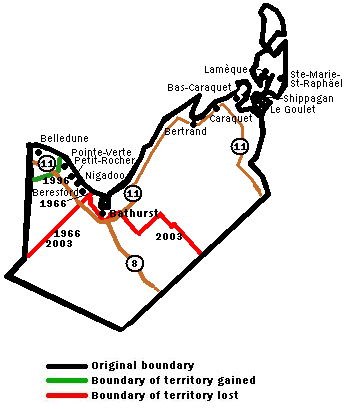

The boundaries reverted to the ones used in the 1996 representation after the 2006 election. The 1997 general election saw the NDP take the riding for the first time, with Yvon Godin holding the district until 2015.

As per the 2012 federal electoral redistribution, the riding gained a small territory from what was part of Miramichi. Following the 2022 Canadian federal electoral redistribution, the riding united all of the Regional Municipality of Tracadie into the riding, taking parts of the municipality from Miramichi—Grand Lake.

=== Members of Parliament ===
This riding has elected the following members of Parliament:

Parliament	Years	Member	Party
Gloucester
1st	1867–1872	Timothy Anglin	Liberal
2nd	1872–1874	Timothy Anglin	Liberal
3rd	1874–1877	Timothy Anglin	Liberal
3rd	1877–1878	Timothy Anglin	Liberal
4th	1878–1882	Timothy Anglin	Liberal
5th	1882–1887	Kennedy Francis Burns	Conservative
6th	1887–1891	Kennedy Francis Burns	Conservative
7th	1891–1894	Kennedy Francis Burns	Conservative
7th	1894–1896	Théotime Blanchard	Conservative
8th	1896–1900	Théotime Blanchard	Conservative
9th	1900–1904	Onésiphore Turgeon	Liberal
10th	1904–1908	Onésiphore Turgeon	Liberal
11th	1908–1911	Onésiphore Turgeon	Liberal
12th	1911–1917	Onésiphore Turgeon	Liberal
13th	1917–1921	Onésiphore Turgeon	Liberal
14th	1921–1922	Onésiphore Turgeon	Liberal
14th	1922–1925	Jean George Robichaud	Liberal
15th	1925–1926	Jean George Robichaud	Liberal
16th	1926–1926	Peter Veniot	Liberal
16th	1926–1930	Peter Veniot	Liberal
17th	1930–1935	Peter Veniot	Liberal
18th	1935–1936	Peter Veniot	Liberal
18th	1936–1940	Clarence Joseph Veniot	Liberal
19th	1940–1945	Clarence Joseph Veniot	Liberal
20th	1945–1949	Clovis-Thomas Richard	Liberal
21st	1949–1952	Clovis-Thomas Richard	Liberal
21st	1952–1953	Albany Robichaud	Progressive Conservative
22nd	1953–1957	Hédard Robichaud	Liberal
23rd	1957–1958	Hédard Robichaud	Liberal
24th	1958–1962	Hédard Robichaud	Liberal
25th	1962–1963	Hédard Robichaud	Liberal
26th	1963–1965	Hédard Robichaud	Liberal
27th	1965–1966	Hédard Robichaud	Liberal
28th	1968–1972	Herb Breau	Liberal
29th	1972–1974	Herb Breau	Liberal
30th	1974–1979	Herb Breau	Liberal
31st	1979–1980	Herb Breau	Liberal
32nd	1980–1984	Herb Breau	Liberal
33rd	1984–1988	Roger Clinch	Progressive Conservative
34th	1988–1993	Doug Young	Liberal
Acadie—Bathurst
35th	1993–1997	Doug Young	Liberal
36th	1997–2000	Yvon Godin	New Democratic
37th	2000–2004	Yvon Godin	New Democratic
38th	2004–2006	Yvon Godin	New Democratic
39th	2006–2008	Yvon Godin	New Democratic
40th	2008–2011	Yvon Godin	New Democratic
41st	2011–2015	Yvon Godin	New Democratic
42nd	2015–2019	Serge Cormier	Liberal
43rd	2019–2021	Serge Cormier	Liberal
44th	2021–2025	Serge Cormier	Liberal
45th	2025–present	Serge Cormier	Liberal

== Election results ==
=== Acadie—Bathurst ===
==== 2025 ====
2025 Canadian federal election
Party	Candidate	Votes	%	±%	Expenditures
Liberal	Serge Cormier	32,556	67.48	+2.52	$41,361.97
Conservative	James Brown	12,541	25.99	+12.14	$8,497.18
New Democratic	Ty Boulay	2,108	4.37	−6.88	$1,474.38
People's	Randi Rachelle Raynard	1,043	2.16	−3.71	$2,779.40
Total valid votes/expense limit		48,248	98.78	–0.04	$122,145.33
Total rejected ballots		594	1.22	+0.04	
Turnout		48,842	70.40		
Eligible voters		69,373			
Liberal notional hold		Swing		−4.81	
Source: Elections Canada
Note: number of eligible voters does not include voting day registrations.

==== 2021 ====
2021 federal election redistributed results
Party	Vote	%
Liberal	28,724	64.96
Conservative	6,124	13.85
New Democratic	4,975	11.25
People's	2,594	5.87
Green	1,249	2.82
Others	549	1.24

2021 Canadian federal election
Party	Candidate	Votes	%	±%	Expenditures
Liberal	Serge Cormier	27,817	64.81	+9.67	$0.00
Conservative	Jean-Paul Lanteigne	5,916	13.78	–7.72	$0.00
New Democratic	Mélissa Hébert	4,906	11.43	–3.04	$10,937.29
People's	Kenneth Edward Langford	2,531	5.90	N/A	$2,507.48
Green	Rachel Johns	1,203	2.80	–6.08	$0.00
Free	Richer Doiron	549	1.28	N/A	$148.67
Total valid votes/expense limit		42,922	100.00	–	$105,427.37
Total rejected ballots		511	1.18	–0.70	
Turnout		43,433	64.78	–8.76	
Eligible voters		67,052			
Liberal hold		Swing		+8.70	
Source: Elections Canada

==== 2019 ====
2019 Canadian federal election
Party	Candidate	Votes	%	±%	Expenditures
Liberal	Serge Cormier	26,547	55.14	+4.43	$52,739.13
Conservative	Martine Savoie	10,352	21.50	+13.94	none listed
New Democratic	Daniel Thériault	6,967	14.47	−24.93	none listed
Green	Robert Kryszko	4,277	8.88	+6.55	$0.00
Total valid votes/expense limit		48,143	100.0		$100,608.92
Total rejected ballots		924	1.88	+1.23	
Turnout		49,067	73.54	−3.25	
Eligible voters		66,718			
Liberal hold		Swing		−4.76	
Source: Elections Canada

==== 2015 ====
2015 Canadian federal election
Party	Candidate	Votes	%	±%	Expenditures
Liberal	Serge Cormier	25,845	50.71	+36.40	$55,485.34
New Democratic	Jason Godin	20,079	39.40	-29.68	$116,542.41
Conservative	Riba Girouard-Riordon	3,852	7.56	-8.98	–
Green	Dominique Breau	1,187	2.33	+2.26	–
Total valid votes/expense limit		50,963	99.35		$200,964.43
Total rejected ballots		336	0.65		
Turnout		51,299	77.03		
Eligible voters		66,594			
Liberal gain from New Democratic		Swing		+33.04	
Source: Elections Canada

2011 federal election redistributed results
Party	Vote	%
New Democratic	32,361	69.08
Conservative	7,749	16.54
Liberal	6,705	14.31
Green	31	0.07

==== 2011 ====
2011 Canadian federal election
Party	Candidate	Votes	%	±%	Expenditures
New Democratic	Yvon Godin	32,067	69.69	+12.27	$59,706.29
Conservative	Louis Robichaud	7,456	16.20	-2.39	$30,447.79
Liberal	Jean Marie Gionet	6,491	14.11	-7.86	$50,735.74
Total valid votes/expense limit		46,014	100.0		$82,556.86
Total rejected, unmarked and declined ballots		595	1.33	+0.21	
Turnout		46,609	70.30	+1.98	
Eligible voters		66,298			
New Democratic hold		Swing		+7.33	

==== 2008 ====
2008 Canadian federal election
Party	Candidate	Votes	%	±%	Expenditures
New Democratic	Yvon Godin	25,849	57.53	+7.63	$57,376.65
Liberal	Odette Robichaud	9,850	21.92	-8.79	$32,225.33
Conservative	Jean-Guy Dubé	8,331	18.54	+1.68	$67,790.01
Green	Michelle Aubin	904	2.01	+0.63	none listed
Total valid votes/expense limit		44,934	100.0		$80,066
Total rejected, unmarked and declined ballots		507	1.12	+0.09	
Turnout		45,441	68.32	-7.14	
Eligible voters		66,509			
New Democratic hold		Swing		+8.21	

==== 2006 ====
2006 Canadian federal election
Party	Candidate	Votes	%	±%	Expenditures
New Democratic	Yvon Godin	25,195	49.90	-4.03	$69,502.02
Liberal	Marcelle Mersereau	15,504	30.71	-1.96	$65,035.20
Conservative	Serge Savoie	8,513	16.86	+5.92	$54,729.58
Green	Philippe Rouselle	699	1.38	-1.07	$774.79
Independent	Eric Landry	362	0.72	–	$2,613.63
Independent	Ulric Degrâce	219	0.43	–	none listed
Total valid votes/expense limit		50,492	100.0		$74,710
Total rejected, unmarked and declined ballots		523	1.03	-0.15	
Turnout		51,015	75.46	+5.08	
Eligible voters		67,608			
New Democratic hold		Swing		-1.04	

==== 2004 ====
2004 Canadian federal election
Party	Candidate	Votes	%	±%	Expenditures
New Democratic	Yvon Godin	23,857	53.93	+7.26	$61,745.98
Liberal	Serge Rousselle	14,452	32.67	-7.75	$60,252.15
Conservative	Joel Bernard	4,841	10.94	-1.97	$51,943.73
Green	Mario Lanteigne	1,085	2.45	–	$7,040.66
Total valid votes/expense limit		44,235	100.0		$71,582
Total rejected, unmarked and declined ballots		527	1.18	-0.04	
Turnout		44,762	70.38	-4.99	
Eligible voters		63,603			
New Democratic notional hold		Swing		+7.50	
Changes from 2000 are based on redistributed results. Conservative Party change is based on the combination of Canadian Alliance and Progressive Conservative Party totals.

2000 federal election redistributed results
Party	Vote	%
New Democratic	21,490	46.67
Liberal	18,613	40.42
Progressive Conservative	3,923	8.52
Alliance	2,021	4.39

==== 2000 ====
2000 Canadian federal election
Party	Candidate	Votes	%	±%	Expenditures
New Democratic	Yvon Godin	23,568	46.61	+6.08	$57,177
Liberal	Bernard Thériault	20,362	40.27	+4.91	$58,623
Progressive Conservative	Alcide Leger	4,321	8.55	-15.56	$36,600
Alliance	Jean Gauvin	2,314	4.58	–	$45,973
Total valid votes/expense limit		50,565	100.00	$63,209	
Total rejected ballots		624	1.22	-1.25	
Turnout		51,189	75.37	-3.28	
Electors on the lists		67,918	–	–	
NDP hold		Swing	+0.59		

==== 1997 ====
1997 Canadian federal election
Party	Candidate	Votes	%	±%	Expenditures
New Democratic	Yvon Godin	21,113	40.53	+34.57	$56,390
Liberal	Doug Young	18,421	35.36	-30.99	$53,440
Progressive Conservative	Norma Landry	12,560	24.11	-3.58	$51,562
Total valid votes/expense limit		52,094	100.00	$60,877	
Total rejected ballots		1,318	2.47	–	
Turnout		53,412	78.65	–	
Electors on the lists		67,912	–	–	
NDP gain from Liberal		Swing	+32.8		

==== 1993 ====
1993 Canadian federal election
Party	Candidate	Votes	%	±%	Expenditures
Liberal	Doug Young	26,782	66.35	+14.60	$45,888
Progressive Conservative	Luce-Andrée Gauthier	11,175	27.69	-15.04	$53,402
New Democratic	Kim Gallant	2,406	5.96	+0.43	$1,508
Total valid votes/expense limit		40,363	100.00	$53,496	
Liberal hold		Swing	+14.8		

=== Gloucester, 1867–1993 ===
1988 Canadian federal election
Party	Candidate	Votes	%	±%
Liberal	Doug Young	20,251	51.75	+13.37
Progressive Conservative	Jean Gauvin	16,721	42.73	-12.39
New Democratic	Serge Robichaud	2,163	5.53	+0.40
Total valid votes		39,135	100.00	
Liberal gain from Progressive Conservative.		Swing	+12.88	

1984 Canadian federal election
Party	Candidate	Votes	%	±%
Progressive Conservative	Roger Clinch	23,524	55.12	+35.51
Liberal	Herb Breau	16,378	38.38	-25.29
New Democratic	Valentine Ward	2,188	5.13	-7.71
Independent	Fernand Losier	584	1.37	
Total valid votes		42,674	100.00	
Progressive Conservative gain from Liberal		Swing	+30.40	

1980 Canadian federal election
Party	Candidate	Votes	%	±%
Liberal	Herb Breau	22,229	63.67	+12.06
Progressive Conservative	Arthur Savoie	6,846	19.61	-19.33
New Democratic	Kevin O'Connell	4,484	12.84	+3.39
Rhinoceros	Jules César Boudreau	736	2.11	
Rhinoceros	Amédé "le Terrible" Boucher	362	1.04	
Independent	Rose-Hélène Aubé	197	0.56	
Marxist–Leninist	Gary Zatzman	59	0.17	
Total valid votes		34,913	100.00	
Liberal hold		Swing	+15.7%	
lop.parl.ca

1979 Canadian federal election
Party	Candidate	Votes	%	±%
Liberal	Herb Breau	18,387	51.61	-5.44
Progressive Conservative	Gastien Godin	13,872	38.94	+15.79
New Democratic	Kevin O'Connell	3,366	9.45	+3.51
Total valid votes		35,625	100.00	

1974 Canadian federal election
Party	Candidate	Votes	%	±%
Liberal	Herb Breau	16,195	57.05	+6.44
Progressive Conservative	Gérard Arseneau	6,571	23.15	-1.47
Social Credit	Lomer Basque	3,935	13.86	-2.12
New Democratic	Yvon Guignard	1,685	5.94	+4.08
Total valid votes		28,386	100.00	

1972 Canadian federal election
Party	Candidate	Votes	%	±%
Liberal	Herb Breau	14,212	50.61	-4.42
Progressive Conservative	Paul Duval	6,914	24.62	-15.81
Social Credit	Lomer Basque	4,487	15.98	Ø
Independent	Percy W. Cormier	1,109	3.95	
Independent	Mathilda Blanchard	839	2.99	
New Democratic	Joe Corbin	521	1.86	-2.68
Total valid votes		28,082	100.00	

1968 Canadian federal election
Party	Candidate	Votes	%	±%
Liberal	Herb Breau	12,196	55.03	-5.58
Progressive Conservative	Frédéric Arsenault	8,960	40.43	+13.17
New Democratic	Florian Robichaud	1,007	4.54	-7.59
Total valid votes		22,163	100.00	

1965 Canadian federal election
Party	Candidate	Votes	%	±%
Liberal	Hédard Robichaud	14,121	60.61	+3.15
Progressive Conservative	J. Léo Hachey	6,351	27.26	+7.82
New Democratic	Martin Kierans	2,826	12.13	
Total valid votes		23,298	100.00	

1963 Canadian federal election
Party	Candidate	Votes	%	±%
Liberal	Hédard Robichaud	13,344	57.46	+0.40
Social Credit	Joseph Dubé	5,365	23.10	
Progressive Conservative	Leo Ferguson	4,515	19.44	-23.50
Total valid votes		23,224	100.00	

1962 Canadian federal election
Party	Candidate	Votes	%	±%
Liberal	Hédard Robichaud	13,519	57.06	+4.23
Progressive Conservative	Antonio Robichaud	10,174	42.94	-4.23
Total valid votes		23,693	100.00	

1958 Canadian federal election
Party	Candidate	Votes	%	±%
Liberal	Hédard Robichaud	13,112	52.83	-5.04
Progressive Conservative	J. Léo Hachey	11,705	47.17	+5.04
Total valid votes		24,817	100.00	

1957 Canadian federal election
Party	Candidate	Votes	%	±%
Liberal	Hédard Robichaud	13,052	57.87	+0.28
Progressive Conservative	J. Léo Hachey	9,502	42.13	+0.91
Total valid votes		22,554	100.00	

1953 Canadian federal election
Party	Candidate	Votes	%	±%
Liberal	Hédard Robichaud	13,330	57.59	+9.89
Progressive Conservative	Albany Robichaud	9,542	41.22	-11.08
Co-operative Commonwealth	Alphonse Landry	276	1.19	
Total valid votes		23,148	100.00	

Canadian federal by-election, 26 May 1952
Party	Candidate	Votes	%	±%
On Clovis-Thomas Richard's acceptance of an office of emolument under the Crown, 5 March 1952
Progressive Conservative	Albany Robichaud	11,245	52.30	+22.08
Liberal	Hédard Robichaud	10,256	47.70	-22.08
Total valid votes		21,501	100.00	

1949 Canadian federal election
Party	Candidate	Votes	%	±%
Liberal	Clovis-Thomas Richard	14,759	69.78	+7.35
Progressive Conservative	J.L. Albert Robichaud	6,391	30.22	-4.10
Total valid votes		21,150	100.00	

Change for Progressive Conservative candidate Albany Robichaud from 1945 are based on his results running as an Independent.

1945 Canadian federal election
Party	Candidate	Votes	%	±%
Liberal	Clovis-Thomas Richard	11,683	62.43	-3.31
Independent	Albany Robichaud	6,423	34.32	+0.09
Co-operative Commonwealth	François-Xavier Blanchard	609	3.25	
Total valid votes		18,715	100.00	

Change for Independent candidate Albany Robichaud from 1940 are based on his results running as a National Government candidate.

1940 Canadian federal election
Party	Candidate	Votes	%	±%
Liberal	Clarence Joseph Veniot	10,451	65.74	-9.22
National Government	Albany Robichaud	5,447	34.26	+15.47
Total valid votes		15,898	100.00	

The "National Government" was the temporary name of the Conservative Party for the 1940 elections, and changes from 1935 are based on the results of the Conservative Party.

Note: Change in popular vote is calculated from popular vote in the 1935 general election.

By-election on 17 August 1936 On Peter Veniot's death, 6 July 1936
Party	Candidate	Votes
Liberal	Clarence Joseph Veniot	acclaimed

1935 Canadian federal election
Party	Candidate	Votes	%	±%
Liberal	Peter Veniot	11,816	74.96	+24.12
Conservative	Albany Robichaud	2,962	18.79	-30.37
Reconstruction	Hector Poirier	985	6.25	
Total valid votes		15,763	100.00	

1930 Canadian federal election
Party	Candidate	Votes	%	±%
Liberal	Peter Veniot	7,716	50.84	-4.95
Conservative (istorical)	Albany Robichaud	7,460	49.16	+4.95
Total valid votes		15,176	100.00	
Source: lop.parl.ca

By-election on 2 November 1926 On Peter Veniot's acceptance of an office of emolument under the Crown, 5 October 1926
Party	Candidate	Votes
Liberal	Peter Veniot	acclaimed

1926 Canadian federal election
Party	Candidate	Votes	%	±%
Liberal	Peter Veniot	7,992	55.79	+1.53
Conservative	Joseph S. Dumas	6,333	44.21	-1.53
Total valid votes		14,325	100.00	

1925 Canadian federal election
Party	Candidate	Votes	%	±%
Liberal	Jean George Robichaud	6,254	54.26	-18.71
Conservative	Joseph Benoît Hachey	5,272	45.74	+18.71
Total valid votes		11,526	100.00	

Note: Change in popular vote is calculated from popular vote in the 1921 general election.

By-election on 20 November 1922 On Onésiphore Turgeon's acceptance of an office of emolument under the Crown, 26 October 1922
Party	Candidate	Votes
Liberal	Jean George Robichaud	acclaimed

1921 Canadian federal election
Party	Candidate	Votes	%
Liberal	Onésiphore Turgeon	7,671	72.97
Conservative	Joseph Edward de Grace	2,842	27.03
Total valid votes		10,513	100.00

1917 Canadian federal election
Party	Candidate	Votes
Opposition (Laurier Liberals)	Onésiphore Turgeon	acclaimed

1911 Canadian federal election
Party	Candidate	Votes	%	±%
Liberal	Onésiphore Turgeon	3,172	59.27	+4.06
Conservative	Theobald M. Burns	2,180	40.73	-4.06
Total valid votes		5,352	100.00	

1908 Canadian federal election
Party	Candidate	Votes	%	±%
Liberal	Onésiphore Turgeon	2,581	55.21	-8.53
Conservative	Theobald M. Burns	2,094	44.79	+8.53
Total valid votes		4,675	100.00	

1904 Canadian federal election
Party	Candidate	Votes	%	±%
Liberal	Onésiphore Turgeon	2,705	63.74	+3.78
Conservative	Théotime Blanchard	1,539	36.26	+2.14
Total valid votes		4,244	100.00	

1900 Canadian federal election
Party	Candidate	Votes	%	±%
Liberal	Onésiphore Turgeon	2,311	59.96	+30.14
Conservative	Théotime Blanchard	1,315	34.12	-16.81
Independent	R. Carr Harris	228	5.92	
Total valid votes		3,854	100.00	

1896 Canadian federal election
Party	Candidate	Votes	%	±%
Conservative	Théotime Blanchard	1,947	50.93	-4.36
Liberal	Onésiphore Turgeon	1,140	29.82	-14.89
Independent	Robert Young	736	19.25	
Total valid votes		3,823	100.00	

Note: Change in popular vote is calculated from popular vote in the 1891 general election.

By-election on 5 May 1894 On Kennedy Burns being called to the Senate, 21 March 1893
Party	Candidate	Votes
Conservative	Théotime Blanchard	acclaimed

1891 Canadian federal election
Party	Candidate	Votes	%	±%
Conservative	Kennedy Francis Burns	1,943	55.29	-0.83
Liberal	W.A. Landry	1,571	44.71	+0.83
Total valid votes		,3514	100.00	

1887 Canadian federal election
Party	Candidate	Votes	%	±%
Conservative	Kennedy Francis Burns	1,908	56.12	+3.93
Liberal	Narc A. Landry	1,492	43.88	+20.49
Total valid votes		3,400	100.00	

1882 Canadian federal election
Party	Candidate	Votes	%
Conservative	Kennedy Francis Burns	1,205	52.19
Conservative	Onésiphore Turgeon	564	24.43
Liberal	Timothy Anglin	540	23.39
Total valid votes		2,309	100.00

1878 Canadian federal election
Party	Candidate	Votes
Liberal	Timothy Anglin	acclaimed

Canadian federal by-election, 2 July 1877
Party	Candidate	Votes	%
Liberal	Timothy Anglin	1,185	58.00
Unknown	Onésiphore Turgeon	858	42.00
Total valid votes		2,043	100.00
Called upon Timothy Anglin's resignation.

1874 Canadian federal election
Party	Candidate	Votes
Liberal	Timothy Anglin	acclaimed
Source: Canadian Elections Database

1872 Canadian federal election
Party	Candidate	Votes	%	±%
Liberal	Timothy Anglin	1,436	80.81	+19.55
Unknown	? DesBrisay	339	19.08	
Unknown	? MacKay	2	0.11	
Total valid votes		1,777	100.00	
Source: Canadian Elections Database

1867 Canadian federal election
Party	Candidate	Votes	%
Liberal	Timothy Anglin	1,061	61.26
Unknown	John Meahan	671	38.74
Total valid votes		1,732	100.00
Source: Canadian Elections Database

== Student vote results ==
Graph of student vote results in Acadie—Bathurst (2011-, minor parties that never got 2% of the vote or didn't run consistently are omitted) View source data.

A student vote was conducted at participating Canadian schools to parallel Canadian federal election results. The vote was designed to educate students and simulate the electoral process for persons who have not yet reached the legal majority. Schools with a large student body that reside in another electoral district had the option to vote for candidates outside of the electoral district then where they were physically located.

=== 2019 ===
2019 Canadian federal election
Party	Candidate	Votes	%	±%
Liberal	Serge Cormier	1,165	38.18	+0.15
Green	Robert Kryszko	774	25.37	+13.7
New Democratic	Daniel Thériault	585	19.17	-25.53
Conservative	Martine Savoie	527	17.27	+11.94
Total valid votes		3,051	100.00	–
Source: Student Vote Canada

=== 2015 ===
2015 Canadian federal election
Party	Candidate	Votes	%	±%
New Democratic	Jason Godin	831	44.7	-22.1
Liberal	Serge Cormier	712	38.03	19.13
Green	Dominique Breau	217	11.67	–
Conservative	Riba Girouard-Riordon	99	5.33	-8.97
Total valid votes		1,859	100.00	
Source: Student Vote Canada

=== 2011 ===
2011 Canadian federal election
Party	Candidate	Votes	%
New Democratic	Yvon Godin	1,000	66.80
Liberal	Jean Marie Gionet	283	18.90
Conservative	Louis Robichaud	214	14.30
Total valid votes		1,497	100.00
Source: Student Vote Canada

== See also ==
- List of Canadian electoral districts
- Historical federal electoral districts of Canada
