= Jason Godin =

Canadian politician (born 1993)

His Worship Jason Godin

Mayor of Maisonnette, New Brunswick
- In office May 12, 2012 – May 2016
- Preceded by: Lucio Cordisco
- Succeeded by: Viviane Baldwin

Personal details
- Born: January 21, 1993 (age 33)
- Profession: Politician; lawyer

Jason Godin (born January 21, 1993) is a Canadian politician and lawyer who served as mayor of Maisonnette, New Brunswick from 2012 to 2016. At 19 years old, he was elected to the municipal election May 14, 2012, and took office May 28, 2012 as the youngest mayor in the history of New Brunswick. Godin decided to run for mayor when he learned that the incumbent, Lucio Cordisco, would not stand for reelection if there were other candidates. On February 12, 2015, he announced that he would seek the federal New Democratic Party nomination in the riding of Acadie—Bathurst for the 2015 federal election. He won the nomination, but was defeated by Liberal Serge Cormier in the general election. Godin did not seek re-election in the 2016 municipal election.

Prior to the election, he was a business administration student at the University of Moncton in Shippagan.

Jason Godin is now a litigation lawyer in Caraquet, NB. He was one of the lawyers for the Forum des maires de la Péninsule acadienne in a lawsuit against the Government of New Brunswick following the closing of two court houses in the north of the province. Justice Bourque of the Court of King's Bench gave reason to the Forum des maires and sat aside the decision of the Government. The Government appealed in front of the New Brunswick Court of Appeal and the hearing is set for October 22, 2024.

== Electoral record ==
2015 Canadian federal election: Acadie—Bathurst
Party	Candidate	Votes	%	±%	Expenditures
Liberal	Serge Cormier	25,845	50.71	+36.40	$55,485.34
New Democratic	Jason Godin	20,079	39.40	-29.68	$116,542.41
Conservative	Riba Girouard-Riordon	3,852	7.56	-8.98	–
Green	Dominique Breau	1,187	2.33	+2.26	–
Total valid votes/expense limit		50,963	99.35		$200,964.43
Total rejected ballots		336	0.65		
Turnout		51,299	77.03		
Eligible voters		66,594			
Liberal gain from New Democratic		Swing		+33.04	
Source: Elections Canada
