= Augustus Henry Novelli =

- Died: 1887
- Education: Cambridge University
- Occupation: Physician
- Known for: Plaintiff in Smith & Novelli v Lay
- Relatives: Philip Charles
- Medical career
- Institutions: Consolidated Bank Limited

Augustus Henry Novelli was a London-based physician who graduated Cambridge University in 1845. He lived for a time at Sydenham Hill. He went on to become involved in the Consolidated Bank Limited, and eventually one of its directors. He was in 1870 a plaintiff in Smith & Novelli v Lay, a suit filed in Court of Chancery, over finance to the Meiji government of Imperial Japan.

Novelli partnered until 1 January 1856 with Charles Hardy Bowker, Francis Koenig and George Dunner as General Commission Merchants.

Novelli was named on 18 October 1860 by the Lord Lieutenant of the Welsh County of Cardigan, Edward Pryse, as his deputy.

As one of the directors of the Consolidated Bank, Novelli was involved in its June 1866 bankruptcy.

Novelli was in October 1867 named a liquidator of the Cachar Company.

Novelli was partnered with Francis Koenig, Charles Hardy Bowker and Heinrich Wrens until 31 December 1885 as Novelli & Co., General Merchants.

Novelli was a member of the Royal College of Physicians, listed in the 1854, 1860, 1866 and 1883 directories.

Augustus Henry Novelli died in 1887.

== Legacy ==
Novelli's wife was Sarah Helena; they had at least one child, Philip Charles, who graduated Trinity College, Cambridge in 1880, passed the Intermediate bar examination on 19 January 1882, and was made a Grand Steward of the Freemasons on 24 April 1889 under Pro Grand Master Earl of Carnarvon and his Deputy, the Earl of Lathom. Philip Charles would go on to be influential in the affairs of the St. Lawrence Lumber Company, before passing in 1905.

In pursuance of section 142 of the Companies Act 1862, a General Meeting of the Members of Novelli and Company was held at the offices of the W. Bolton Liquidator, 13 Spring-gardens Manchester, on 28 March 1894 at three o'clock in the afternoon, to have the account laid of the bankruptcy, disposal and winding up of the firm. The bankruptcy affected, amongst others, the St. Lawrence Lumber Company, which collapsed as a result.
