= Albany Robichaud =

Canadian politician

Member of Parliament for Gloucester
- In office May 1952 – August 1953
- Preceded by: Clovis-Thomas Richard
- Succeeded by: Hédard Robichaud

Personal details
- Born: Albany M. Robichaud; 22 July 1903 Shippagan, New Brunswick, Canada
- Died: 27 October 1974 (aged 71) Bathurst, New Brunswick, Canada
- Party: Progressive Conservative
- Profession: barrister

Albany M. Robichaud (22 July 1903 – 27 October 1974) was a Canadian lawyer and politician. Robichaud was a Progressive Conservative party member of the House of Commons of Canada. He was born in Shippagan, New Brunswick and became a barrister by career.

He attended University of St. Joseph's College where he graduated with a Bachelor of Arts degree in 1923, then in 1926 attained a Master of Arts. He proceeded to the University of New Brunswick for law studies where in 1927 he received a Bachelor of Civil Law degree then called to the bar that year. He then established a law practice in Bathurst, New Brunswick and in 1943 received a Doctor of Civil Law degree from Bathurst's Université du Sacré-Coeur. From 1945 to 1948, he was mayor of Bathurst.

Robichaud ran unsuccessful campaigns for a House of Commons seat at the Gloucester riding in several federal elections. In 1930 and 1935 and 1940, he was a Conservative candidate (with the Conservatives known as the "National Government" party in 1940). He ran as an independent at Gloucester in 1945.

Robichaud was elected to Parliament for the Progressive Conservative party in a by-election on 26 May 1952. He was defeated in the 1953 federal election by Hédard Robichaud of the Liberal party.

After leaving federal office, Albany Robichaud became the fifth Acadian to be appointed a judge for the Court of Queen's Bench of New Brunswick, the province's superior court.

He bought and lived in the Flavien Doucet Residence, a historic site in Bathurst district.

== Electoral record ==
1953 Canadian federal election: Gloucester
Party	Candidate	Votes	%	±%
Liberal	Hédard Robichaud	13,330	57.59	+9.89
Progressive Conservative	Albany Robichaud	9,542	41.22	-11.08
Co-operative Commonwealth	Alphonse Landry	276	1.19	
Total valid votes		23,148	100.00	

Canadian federal by-election, 26 May 1952
Party	Candidate	Votes	%	±%
On Clovis-Thomas Richard's acceptance of an office of emolument under the Crown, 5 March 1952
Progressive Conservative	Albany Robichaud	11,245	52.30	+22.08
Liberal	Hédard Robichaud	10,256	47.70	-22.08
Total valid votes		21,501	100.00	
