= Hédard Robichaud =

Canadian politician

The Honourable Hédard Robichaud PC OC
- Official 1966 portrait

Lieutenant Governor of New Brunswick
- In office 8 October 1971 – 23 December 1981
- Monarch: Elizabeth II
- Governors General: Roland Michener; Jules Léger; Edward Schreyer
- Premier: Richard Hatfield
- Preceded by: Wallace Samuel Bird
- Succeeded by: George Stanley

Senator for Gloucester, New Brunswick
- In office 28 June 1968 – 8 October 1971
- Appointed by: Pierre Trudeau

Member of the Canadian Parliament for Gloucester
- In office 10 August 1953 – 25 June 1968
- Preceded by: Albany Robichaud
- Succeeded by: Herb Breau

Personal details
- Born: Hédard Joseph Robichaud; 2 November 1911 Shippagan, New Brunswick, Canada
- Died: 16 August 1999 (aged 87) Bathurst, New Brunswick, Canada
- Party: Liberal
- Parent: Jean George Robichaud (father)

Hédard Joseph Robichaud PC OC (2 November 1911 – 16 August 1999) was an Acadian-Canadian Member of Parliament, Cabinet member, Senator and the first Acadian to be Lieutenant Governor of New Brunswick.

Born in Shippagan, New Brunswick, the son of Jean George Robichaud and Amanda Boudreau, he received a B.A. from the Université Saint-Joseph, later the University of Moncton, in 1931.

He first ran for the House of Commons as a Liberal candidate in a 1952 by-election in the riding of Gloucester, New Brunswick and lost. He was elected in the 1953 federal election, and was re-elected in the 1957, 1958, 1962, 1963 and 1965 elections. From 1963 to 1968, he was the Minister of Fisheries.

In 1968, he was appointed to the Senate representing the Senatorial division of Gloucester, New Brunswick. He resigned in 1971 to become the 24th lieutenant governor of New Brunswick. He served in that position until 1981.

In 1985, he was made an officer of the Order of Canada.

He was the husband of Gertrude Léger (1916–2011) and the father of nine.

== Electoral record ==
1965 Canadian federal election: Gloucester
Party	Candidate	Votes	%	±%
Liberal	Hédard Robichaud	14,121	60.61	+3.15
Progressive Conservative	J. Léo Hachey	6,351	27.26	+7.82
New Democratic	Martin Kierans	2,826	12.13	
Total valid votes		23,298	100.00	

1963 Canadian federal election: Gloucester
Party	Candidate	Votes	%	±%
Liberal	Hédard Robichaud	13,344	57.46	+0.40
Social Credit	Joseph Dubé	5,365	23.10	
Progressive Conservative	Leo Ferguson	4,515	19.44	-23.50
Total valid votes		23,224	100.00	

1962 Canadian federal election: Gloucester
Party	Candidate	Votes	%	±%
Liberal	Hédard Robichaud	13,519	57.06	+4.23
Progressive Conservative	Antonio Robichaud	10,174	42.94	-4.23
Total valid votes		23,693	100.00	

1958 Canadian federal election: Gloucester
Party	Candidate	Votes	%	±%
Liberal	Hédard Robichaud	13,112	52.83	-5.04
Progressive Conservative	J. Léo Hachey	11,705	47.17	+5.04
Total valid votes		24,817	100.00	

1957 Canadian federal election: Gloucester
Party	Candidate	Votes	%	±%
Liberal	Hédard Robichaud	13,052	57.87	+0.28
Progressive Conservative	J. Léo Hachey	9,502	42.13	+0.91
Total valid votes		22,554	100.00	

1953 Canadian federal election: Gloucester
Party	Candidate	Votes	%	±%
Liberal	Hédard Robichaud	13,330	57.59	+9.89
Progressive Conservative	Albany Robichaud	9,542	41.22	-11.08
Co-operative Commonwealth	Alphonse Landry	276	1.19	
Total valid votes		23,148	100.00	

Canadian federal by-election, 26 May 1952
Party	Candidate	Votes	%	±%
On Clovis-Thomas Richard's acceptance of an office of emolument under the Crown, 5 March 1952
Progressive Conservative	Albany Robichaud	11,245	52.30	+22.08
Liberal	Hédard Robichaud	10,256	47.70	-22.08
Total valid votes		21,501	100.00	
