= Margaret Anglin =

Canadian stage actress, director and producer (1876–1958)

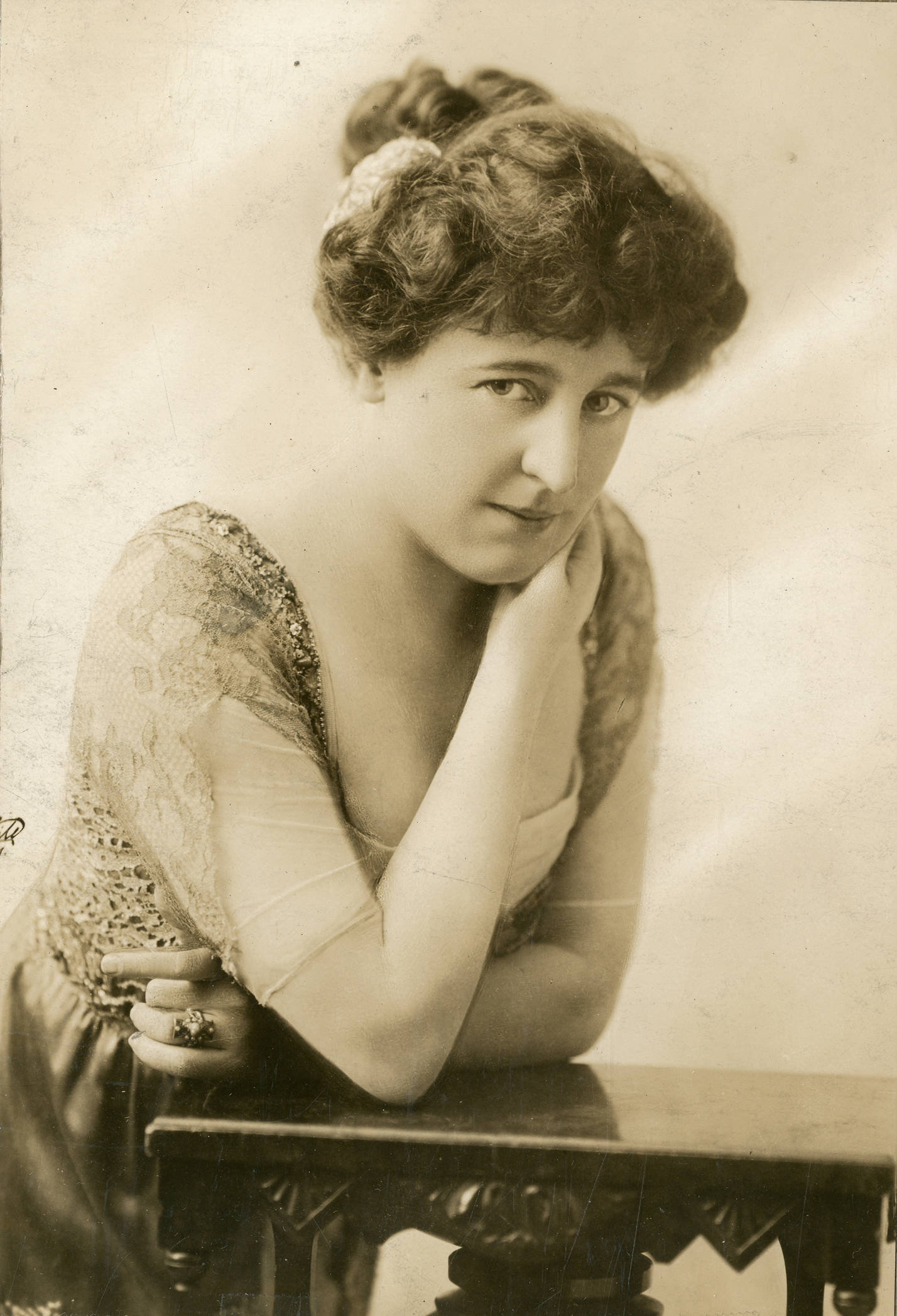
- Anglin in 1912
- Born: Mary Margaret Warren Anglin; April 3, 1876; Ottawa, Ontario, Canada
- Died: January 7, 1958 (aged 81); Toronto, Ontario, Canada
- Occupations: Actress, director, producer
- Spouse: Howard Hull (m. 1911; died 1937)
- Children: 3
- Father: Timothy Warren Anglin
- Relatives: Henry Hull (brother-in-law); Josephine Hull (sister-in-law)

Mary Margaret Warren Anglin (April 3, 1876 – January 7, 1958) was a Canadian-born American Broadway actress, director and producer. Encyclopædia Britannica calls her "one of the most brilliant actresses of her day."

== Biography ==
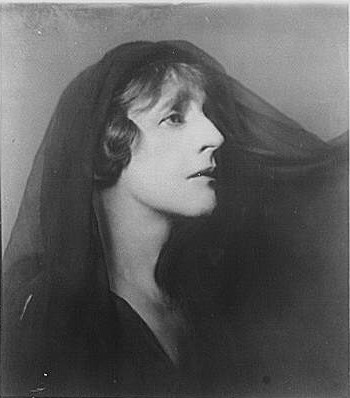
Anglin as Electra, between 1910 and 1925

Anglin was born in Ottawa, Ontario, the youngest of nine children of newspaper editor and politician Timothy Warren Anglin (1822–1896) by his second wife, Ellen MacTavish. At the time of her birth in Ottawa, April 3, 1876, he was the Speaker of the House of Commons of Canada. Her older brother, Francis Alexander Anglin (1865–1933) served as Chief Justice of Canada from 1924 to 1933.

She was educated at Loretto Abbey, Toronto, and at the Convent of the Sacred Heart, Montreal. She graduated from the Empire School of Dramatic Acting, New York, in 1894, where she studied under Nelson Wheatcroft. Her acting skills brought the attention of theatre impresario Charles Frohman who enabled her professional stage debut in 1894 in the Bronson Howard production of Shenandoah.

An injury sustained while out riding laid her up for some months. In 1896 she became leading lady with James O'Neill, and toured with him in the United States and Canada. Her first professional appearance occurred as Madeline West in Shenandoah She subsequently played with the Sothern Company, and scored a great success as Lady Ursula. In 1896 she played Ophelia opposite James O'Neill. She made her Broadway debut in the 1898 production of Lord Chumley then achieved considerable fame in 1898 on tour portraying "Roxane" in the Edmond Rostand play, Cyrano de Bergerac starring Richard Mansfield. She became leading lady with Charles Frohman in California in 1899. She performed with the Empire Theatre Company, New York.

By 1905 she had gained wide recognition for her acting skills and in December of that year The New York Times reported that, following a benefit matinee for the Jewish sufferers in Russia, the doyenne of the stage Sarah Bernhardt asked Anglin to perform with her in the Maurice Maeterlinck play Pelléas et Mélisande. The blessing by the great Bernhardt sealed Margaret Anglin's reputation as the new star of American theatre.

Anglin became known for her "striking capacity to move effectively and swiftly through the often contradictory emotions felt by heroines" and her ability "to wring tears from the audience while she did so. At the same time Anglin was also praised for avoiding excessive sentimentality" (Meyers 28). Anglin's compelling performances and unique acting style, alongside her Greek productions would become her most noteworthy contributions to the American stage.

Anglin was 33 when she moved back to America after her grand tour in Australia. Upon her arrival in the summer of 1909, she began "taking her first steps towards the production of Greek tragedy" (Le Vay 121), which started with an "intensive study of… Greek plays" (Le Vay 121) and is "generally considered her most noteworthy contribution to the life of the American theatre" (Le Vay 121). Anglin's first role in a Greek tragedy was as Antigone in a single performance at the Hearst Greek Theatre at U.C. Berkeley. Although Anglin had virtually no prior experience performing in Greek tragedies or classic verse plays of any kind, she was enticed by William Dallam Armes invitation, which stated that this opportunity would provide "ample opportunity for the display of your great ability as an emotional actress" (Meyers 30). She immediately accepted the offer, and would embrace all areas of the project's production. On her own shoulders Anglin loaded the multiple responsibilities of directing, staging, selecting a chorus (Greek, not musical comedy), arranging and rearranging 'business', choosing costumes, supervising electricians, actors, musicians, and stage hands, up to the last detail relating to the performance" (Young 36); leaving only the publicity and advertisement to her husband who acted as her business manager. Anglin believed that "the classical play is the highest expression for the player" (Meyers 28) and her passion for the form fueled her professionalism and attention to detail. From 1910 to 1928, she would go on to produce, under her own management, Antigone, Electra, Iphigenia in Aulis, and Medea at the Greek Theatre at Berkeley, Carnegie Hall, and the Metropolitan Opera House. Each revival was met with high critical acclaim and for Anglin, the "problem was not how to attract the public, but how to provide accommodations for the people who besieged the box office" (Meyers 39).

Anglin's productions proved not only to be impressive professional feats, but her artistic decisions to pair the Greek classics with the modern conventions of the time were incredibly innovative. Anglin did "not believe in ignoring the conventions of the stage today, simply because such conventions did not exist in the time of Sophocles, and Euripides" (Meyers 31). Although her productions kept the classic Greek tradition of using virtually no scenery, allowing the costumes to provide much of the spectacle, she did not attempt to replicate the costumes or mask that would have been worn by the original Greek actors. She implemented modern realistic makeup to replace masks, cast women to play the female roles, used modern music, and set the plays at night using artificial light instead of using daylight. Anglin "was always intent on humanizing the ancient works" for her modern audiences so that they "understood that they dealt with universal and lasting concerns" (Meyers 44) and her choices reflect this ambition.

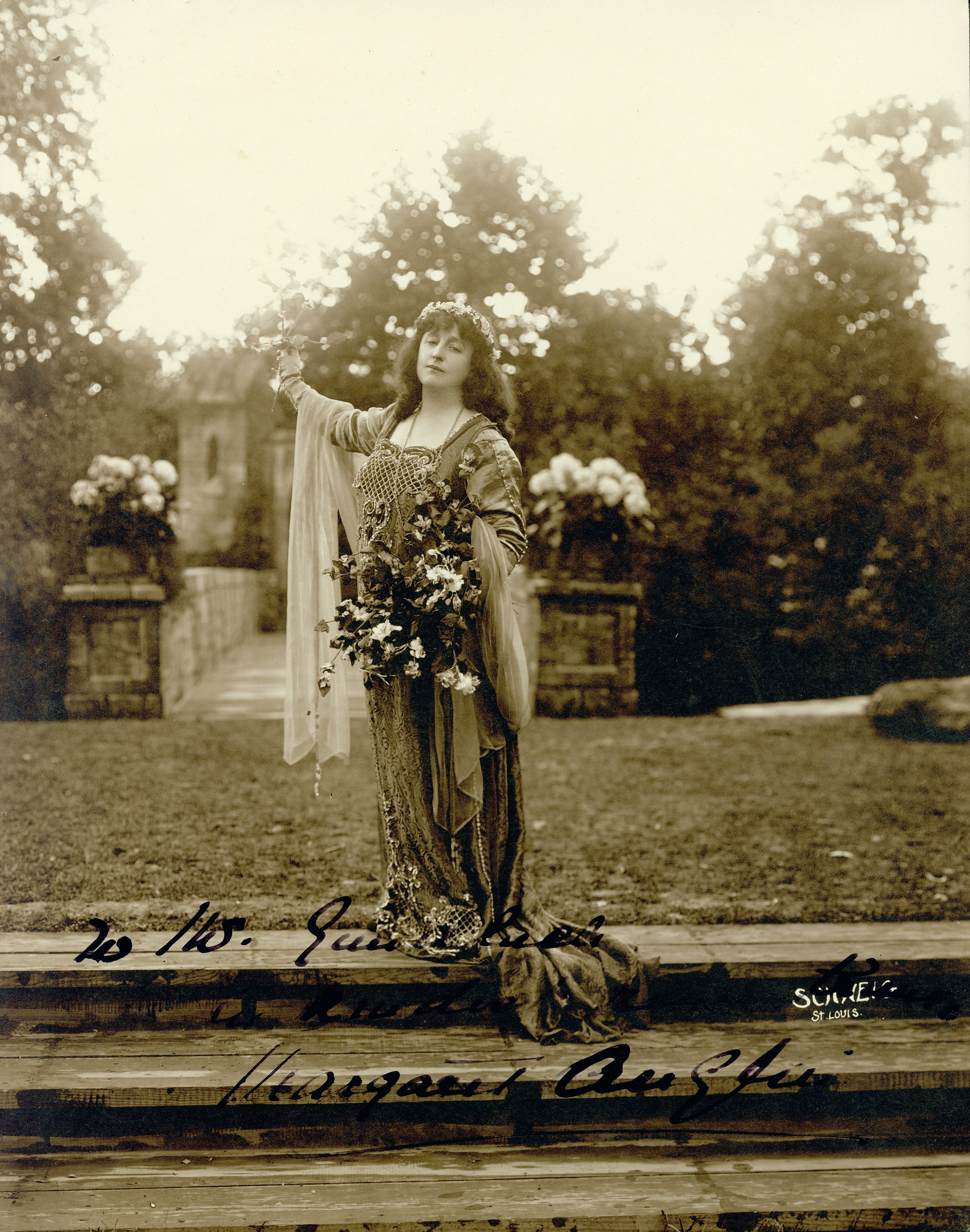
Anglin in As You Like It. 1916. Forest Park.

Inspired by reading the classics and a love for the Greek tragedies that centered on women, Margaret Anglin became the dominant dramatic actress of the first two decades of the 20th century in Greek tragedies and acclaimed for her performances in Shakespearean plays, acting and producing The Taming of the Shrew, As You Like It, and Twelfth Night in repertory at Broadway's Hudson Theatre in 1914.

In 1911 Anglin became a U.S. citizen through her marriage to fellow actor Howard Hull. In 1929, after her husband had not been cast in a Broadway production for twenty years, she insisted that producers give him a role in her plays. Balked at by the producers, she walked out on a production and did not return to the New York stage until 1936 in what would be her final Broadway appearance. Like many Broadway luminaries at the beginning of the century Anglin refused to sacrifice her theatrical art by appearing in motion pictures.

Anglin starred in the original version of the radio program Orphans of Divorce when it was "a once-weekly night-time serial."

Anglin returned to live in Toronto in 1953. She died on January 7, 1958. She had three children. She was buried in Toronto in the Anglin family plot at Mount Hope Catholic Cemetery.
