= Timothy Anglin =

Canadian politician (1822–1896)

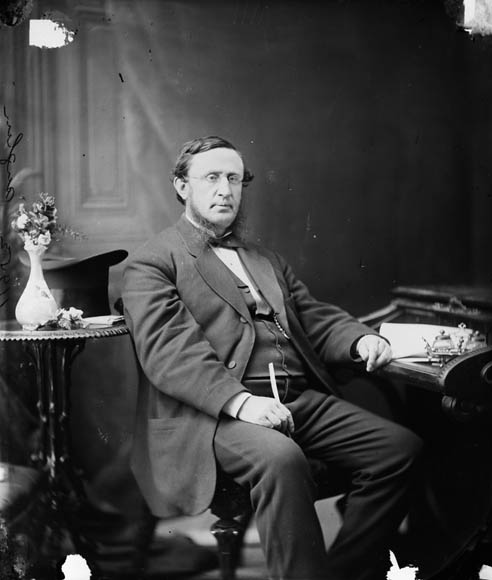
- Anglin in May 1872

2nd Speaker of the House of Commons
- In office March 26, 1874 – February 12, 1879
- Preceded by: James Cockburn
- Succeeded by: Joseph-Goderic Blanchet

Member of the Canadian Parliament for Gloucester, New Brunswick
- In office September 20, 1867 – June 19, 1882
- Preceded by: Position established
- Succeeded by: Kennedy Francis Burns

Personal details
- Born: Timothy Warren Anglin; August 31, 1822 Clonakilty, County Cork, United Kingdom of Great Britain and Ireland
- Died: May 4, 1896 (aged 73)
- Party: Liberal
- Children: 9, including Francis, Mary
- Occupation: Newspaper editor Newspaper owner

Timothy Warren Anglin (August 31, 1822 – May 4, 1896) was a Canadian politician who served as the 2nd speaker of the House of Commons.

== Biography ==
Born in Clonakilty, County Cork, United Kingdom of Great Britain and Ireland, Anglin emigrated at the age of 26 as part of the exodus caused by the Great Famine. Following a sectarian riot in New Brunswick between members of the Orange Order and Catholics, Anglin appealed for moderation and unity. This led him to take up the editorship of a new newspaper, The Freeman, in 1849, which made him an influential voice in the colony. He was elected to the Legislative Assembly of New Brunswick in 1861, and became an opponent of Canadian Confederation and of the government of Samuel Leonard Tilley which he helped defeat in 1865. Tilley returned to power the next year, however, with the defeat of the Anti-Confederation Party in the election. Anglin lost his own seat.

New Brunswick entered Confederation as a province in 1867 and Anglin won a seat in the new House of Commons of Canada as a Liberal Member of Parliament (MP) for the riding of Gloucester in the country's first general election.

When the Liberals came to power in the 1874 election, the new Prime Minister of Canada, Alexander Mackenzie, nominated Anglin as speaker of the House of Commons.

Anglin's term as Speaker was controversial. The Speaker is expected to act in a non-partisan manner and be above politics, but Anglin used his rulings as Speaker as opportunities to enter into partisan debate. Even more troubling to the opposition was that he retained his position as editor of a partisan newspaper during his term as Speaker, and used his position to write editorials berating the Opposition. Especially controversial was that his newspaper was given government printing contracts. Anglin was accused of violating the Independence of Parliament Act for accepting government printing contracts, and was censured by the House of Commons Committee on Privilege in 1877. Anglin was forced to resign as Speaker and as an MP, but was re-elected to the House of Commons in the by-election that was held to fill his seat. He was successfully renominated by Mackenzie to the position of Speaker.

Anglin's period as Speaker ended with the 1878 election that defeated the Liberal government. He remained in the House of Commons until he lost his seat in the 1882 election. Following his defeat, Anglin moved to Toronto and became editor of the Toronto Tribune. In the 1887 election, he was defeated in his bid to win a seat from the Ontario riding of Simcoe North.

Three of Anglin's nine children were notably successful; Francis Alexander Anglin was Chief Justice of Canada from 1924 to 1933, Arthur Whyte Anglin was a successful lawyer in private practice, and Mary Margaret Anglin became the first internationally renowned Canadian stage actress.

== Electoral record ==
Simcoe North

1887 Canadian federal election
Party	Candidate	Votes	%	±%
Conservative	Dalton McCarthy	2,362	53.7	-0.1
Liberal	Timothy Warren Anglin	2,033	46.3	
Total valid votes		4,395	100.0	

1882 Canadian federal election: Gloucester
Party	Candidate	Votes	%
Conservative	Kennedy Francis Burns	1,205	52.19
Conservative	Onésiphore Turgeon	564	24.43
Liberal	Timothy Anglin	540	23.39
Total valid votes		2,309	100.00

1878 Canadian federal election: Gloucester
Party	Candidate	Votes
Liberal	Timothy Anglin	acclaimed

Canadian federal by-election, 2 July 1877
Party	Candidate	Votes	%
Liberal	Timothy Anglin	1,185	58.00
Unknown	Onésiphore Turgeon	858	42.00
Total valid votes		2,043	100.00
Called upon Timothy Anglin's resignation.

1874 Canadian federal election: Gloucester
Party	Candidate	Votes
Liberal	Timothy Anglin	acclaimed
Source: Canadian Elections Database

1872 Canadian federal election: Gloucester
Party	Candidate	Votes	%	±%
Liberal	Timothy Anglin	1,436	80.81	+19.55
Unknown	? DesBrisay	339	19.08	
Unknown	? MacKay	2	0.11	
Total valid votes		1,777	100.00	
Source: Canadian Elections Database

1867 Canadian federal election: Gloucester
Party	Candidate	Votes	%
Liberal	Timothy Anglin	1,061	61.26
Unknown	John Meahan	671	38.74
Total valid votes		1,732	100.00
Source: Canadian Elections Database
