= Tranquille Blanchard =

Tranquille Blanchard (c. 1773 – 21 May 1843) was a merchant in New Brunswick whose mercantile endeavors were closely associated with Charles Robin and Company.

Blanchard operated his business at Caraquet where he dealt in the usual supplies for a fishing community such as this one. His important function was in the cod fishery where he acted as an agent for Charles Robin and Company. This activity was important in the development of the fishing industry and the permanent colonization of the area.
