= Maher v Town Council of Portland =

Canadian constitutional law case – 1874

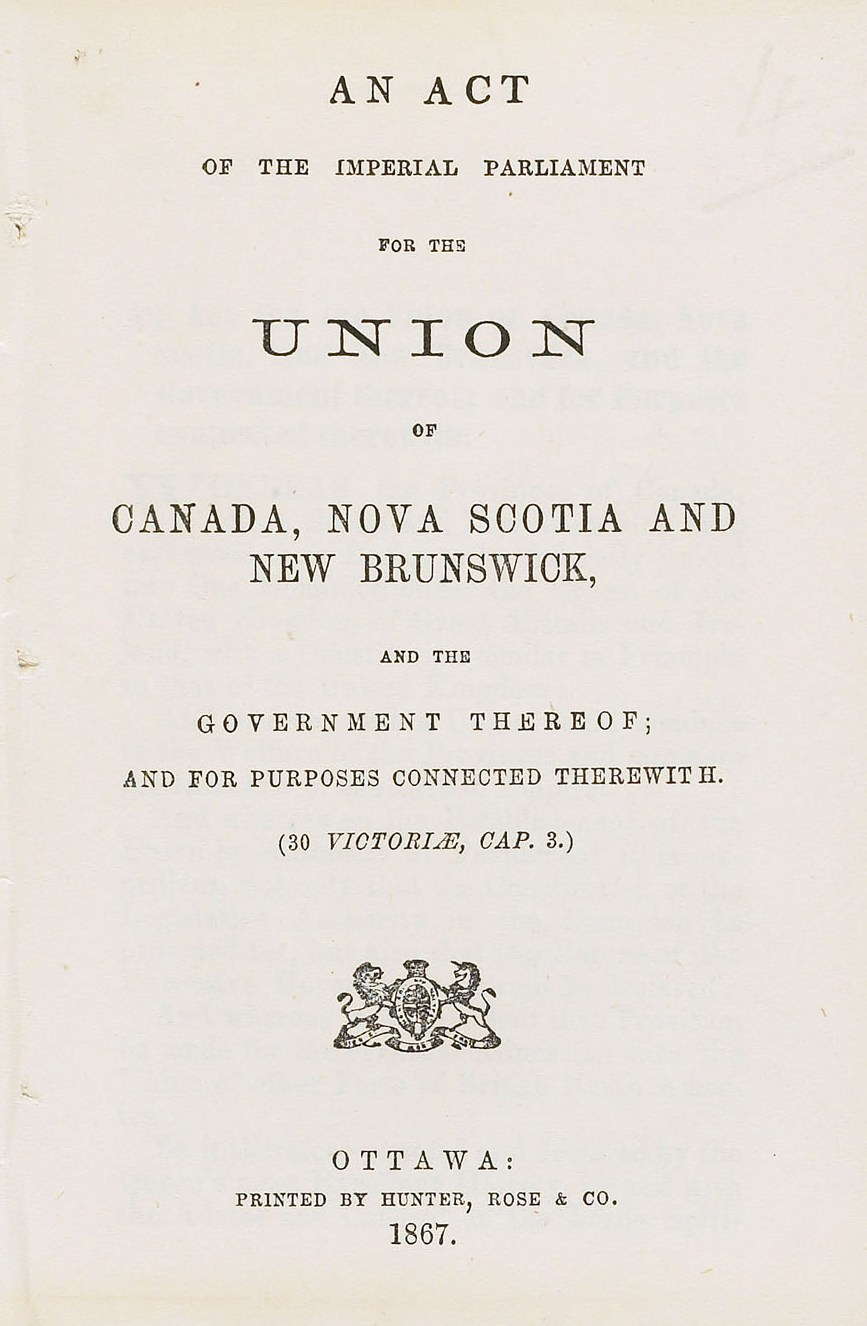
- The Maher decision was one of the first cases interpreting s. 93 of the British North America Act, 1867
- Court: Judicial Committee of the Privy Council
- Full case name: Henry Maher v Town Council of Portland
- Decided: August 6, 1874
- Citations: [1874] UKPC 83 (for record of proceedings in the Judicial Committee); Wheeler's Confederation Law of Canada (London: Eyre & Spottiswoode, 1896), pp. 362-366 (for reasons for judgment)

Case history
- Appealed from: Ex parte Maher, Supreme Court of New Brunswick, June 17, 1873 (unreported)
- Related actions: Ex parte Renaud (1873), 1 N.B.R. 273 (N.B. S.C.).

Court membership
- Judges sitting: Sir James W. Colvile; Lord Justice Mellish; Lord Justice James; Sir Montague E. Smith; Sir Robert Collier

Case opinions
- The Common Schools Act of New Brunswich was constitutional and did not infringe denominational school rights protected by s. 93 of the British North America Act, 1867
- Decision by: Lord Justice James

Keywords
- Constitutional law; division of powers; denominational schools

Maher v Town Council of Portland is a Canadian constitutional law court decision dealing with the constitutional guarantees for denominational schools set out in section 93 of the Constitution Act, 1867 (formerly the British North America Act, 1867). The issue was whether the Common Schools Act, enacted by the Province of New Brunswick in 1871, infringed the guarantee of denominational schools set out in section 93(1).

The court case was part of the larger debate on public funding and the role of the churches in public affairs in New Brunswick. The litigation was triggered by the Legislature of New Brunswick passing the Common Schools Act, which explicitly provided that public schools were to be non-sectarian, open to all, and under the supervision of a provincial Board of Education. Some schools under the previous system had been under the effective control of particular religious denominations, in areas where the adherents of those denominations were in the majority. Opposition to the new school system came from the Roman Catholic Church and the Anglican Church.

The case was ultimately decided by the Judicial Committee of the Privy Council in Britain, at that time the court of last resort for Canada within the British Empire. The Judicial Committee held that the parish schools established under the previous law, the Parish Schools Act of 1858, were not denominational schools established by law, and were not within the protection of section 93(1). The new Common Schools Act therefore did not infringe any legal "right or privilege" possessed by anyone in New Brunswick at the time of Confederation and was constitutional. Maher v Town Council of Portland was the first case decided by the Judicial Committee under section 93 of the Constitution Act, 1867.

== Development of the New Brunswick School System ==
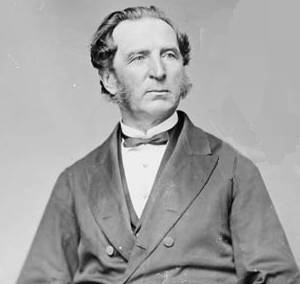
Premier Charles Fisher, whose government introduced the Parish Schools Act. He was later appointed to the Supreme Court of New Brunswick and sat on the challenge to the Common Schools Act. His concurring opinion was upheld by the Judicial Committee.

Prior to Confederation, the school system in New Brunswick was governed by the Parish Schools Act of 1858, enacted by the government led by Premier Charles Fisher. That Act provided for schools to be set up on a voluntary basis in parishes, supported by voluntary financial contributions and tuition fees. Alternatively, the rate-payers in a parish could vote to impose local taxes in support of the parish school, in which case attendance at the school was free to all students. ("Parish" was the term used for one of the forms of local government at the time, rather than as a term of church organization.) As well, the Legislature appropriated a lump sum each year to support the parish schools. There was a Board of Education for the entire colony, composed of the colonial Cabinet, with overall supervision of the schools, but in practice the schools were under local control, often under the auspices of different churches and religious bodies.

The Parish Schools Act provided that the school libraries were not to contain any books hostile to the Christian religion, nor works of controversial theology. Teachers were to impress on the pupils "the principles of christianity, morality, and justice" as well as other moral and civil virtues, but in no case was a pupil to be required to read or study any religious book or participate in any act of devotion. Bible readings were permitted, on direction of the Board of Education, but only to pupils whose parents did not object.

The provincial Legislature enacted the Common Schools Act in 1871. George King, the provincial Attorney General, introduced the Bill in the Assembly and was responsible for its passage. The Assembly passed the Bill after strenuous political debate, including the adoption of a House amendment requiring that the schools be non-sectarian. The new Act carried forward much of the structure of the Parish Schools Act, but with some significant differences. The supervisory control of the provincial Board of Education was strengthened. School taxation was now made compulsory, not voluntary. Provincial funding was only to be provided to schools established under the Act. The schools were to be non-sectarian, and the Common Schools Act did not contain any provision authorising Bible readings.

== Decision of the New Brunswick Supreme Court ==
=== Summary ===
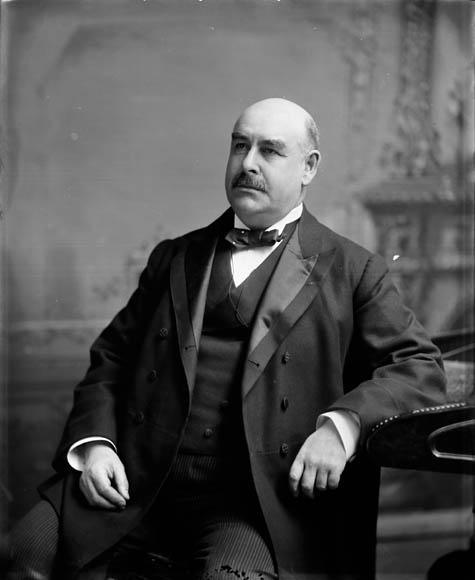
Attorney General George Edwin King, who introduced the Common Schools Act in the New Brunswick Legislature, and defended it in the courts

There were two separate legal challenges to the new school system, brought in the New Brunswick Supreme Court: Ex parte Maher and Ex parte Renaud. The Maher case was brought by Henry Maher, a Roman Catholic rate-payer in the town of Portland (now part of the City of Saint John), who challenged the school tax assessed by the town under the Common Schools Act. The Renaud case was brought by an individual named Renaud, and challenged a school tax assessed by the Parish of Richibucto, in the County of Kent. In both cases, the plaintiffs applied for certiorari to quash the school taxes, on the basis that the Common Schools Act infringed the right of Roman Catholics to have denominational schools, under s. 93 of the Constitution Act, 1867.

The full Supreme Court of New Brunswick, consisting of five judges, heard both applications. The Court dismissed the constitutional challenges and upheld the constitutionality of the Common Schools Act. The reasons given by the Court in the two cases are identical. The majority decision was written in both cases by Chief Justice Ritchie (Justices Allen and Weldon concurring). Justice Fisher (having left politics and been appointed to the Court) and Justice Wetmore each wrote separate concurring decisions.

=== Majority reasons of Chief Justice Ritchie ===
Chief Justice Ritchie began by holding that the courts had the power to review the constitutionality of provincial statutes under the Constitution Act, 1867. He stated that this position had long been established in the New Brunswick courts, but he thought it necessary to state it expressly, since there had been some recent decisions in Quebec which questioned that principle. Chief Justice Ritchie referred to the Colonial Laws Validity Act 1865, as well as the advisory decision of the judges of England with respect to the Clergy Reserves Act of the Province of Canada, as establishing that a colonial law had to comply with the terms of an Imperial statute which applied to the colony. On that basis, the laws of New Brunswick had to comply with the terms of the Constitution Act, 1867.

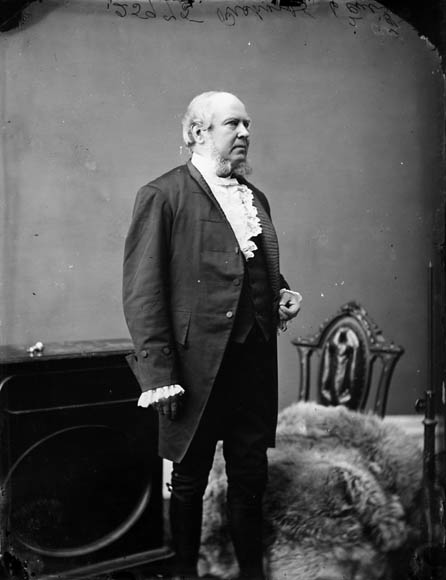
Chief Justice Ritchie, who wrote the majority decision upholding the Common Schools Act

Turning to the constitutional issue, Chief Justice Ritchie stated that to decide if the rights of the Roman Catholic minority were infringed by the Common Schools Act, it was necessary to determine what rights they had under the law immediately before Confederation, since s. 93 of the Constitution Act, 1867 protected whatever rights they possessed at that time. He noted that there clearly were some denominational schools, operated by churches and teaching the specific tenets of those churches beliefs. He referred to specific schools run by the Methodist, Anglican, Presbyterian and Roman Catholic churches. However, those schools were not affected by the Common Schools Act and therefore did not have to be considered in his decision. Rather, it was the schools established under the Parish Schools Act which had to be considered since they were established under the law immediately in force prior to Confederation, and were affected by the changes made by the Common Schools Act.

Chief Justice Ritchie noted that the local school trustees were elected by the voters generally, and were under the supervision of the provincial Board of Education and the provincial Superintendent. Although the Parish Schools Act did provide that teachers were to inculcate the principles of Christianity, honesty and morality, the Act also provided that in doing so, teachers were not to require a student to read any religious book or join in any act of devotion to which the student's parents objected. Bible readings were permitted where authorised by local regulation, including the option of using the Douay version for Roman Catholic students, but without any additional note or comment by the teacher. By another section of the Parish Schools Act, contentious books relating to theology were not permitted in the school libraries.

One of the arguments advanced by the applicants was that even though the Act did not specifically confer control over the schools on any denomination, in practice the schools were under denominational control in those areas where a particular religious group formed the majority and thus could elect local trustees of their religious group. Those trustees in turn would allow teaching of their denomination's particular principles. The applicants argued that the schools were in fact denominational in nature, and therefore that right had to be protected. Chief Justice Ritchie rejected that argument, noting that any religious teachings were done without the authority of the Parish Schools Act, and may or may not have been with the sanction of the provincial Board of Education. That practice could not interfere with the right of all inhabitants under the Act to have a school free and independent of denominational connection.

Chief Justice Ritchie concluded that the Parish Schools Act created a general system of education for the benefit of all inhabitants of the Province, without reference to class or creed. The schools were public schools, not under the control of any denomination. No denomination had any particular rights in the schools and did not have the right to have their own religious doctrines taught in the schools. Rather, there was a general recognition of Christian precepts as part of the education of the students, without favouring any denomination in particular.

=== Concurring Reasons of Justice Fisher ===
Justice Fisher concurred in the majority's conclusion, but gave his own reasons. Prior to his appointment to the court, he had been a Father of Confederation and had participated in both the Quebec Conference and the London Conference which had produced the terms of Confederation and the text of the Constitution Act, 1867. He agreed with the majority that the Common Schools Act did not infringe s. 93 of the Constitution Act, 1867 and was constitutional. He began by noting that the purpose of s. 93 was to resolve a question that had caused serious difficulties in the former Province of Canada, prior to Confederation. Paragraphs 93(2) and (3) only applied to the provinces of Quebec and Ontario. The constitutionality of the Common Schools Act depended entirely on paragraph 93(1). It was not simply a right of privilege of the minority faith which triggers paragraph 93(1). It had to be a right or privilege, of the members of the minority faith, with respect to denominational schools, which they had at law at the time of Union, and which was prejudicially affected by a subsequent government action.

The first question was therefore to define a "denominational school". Justice Fisher stated that a denominational school is a school under the exclusive government of some one denomination of Christians, and where the tenets of that denomination are taught. If that condition were met, it would be necessary to examine the laws in force at the time of union, to determine if any such school existed at law, and if the right of the minority faith has been prejudicially affected.

Justice Fisher then reviewed the provisions of the Parish Schools Act. In his view, the schools established under the act were under the control of the Board of Education, a purely political body, and under the supervision of the Superintendent, a political officer. Like Chief Justice Ritchie, he referred to the provision barring books of controversial theology from the school libraries. Justice Fisher interpreted that provision as barring books of denominational teaching. He concluded that the schools were common to everyone, irrespective of religious opinions. No class or creed had any special right in the governance of the schools generally, or in any particular parish school. As well, the Act provided that no student was to read any religious book or participate in any religious act of devotion, unless the student's parents wished it. Justice Fisher held that this provision was a positive enactment against denominational teaching by the school. He also concluded that the provision for Bible readings in the schools did not establish that the schools were denominational, since in his view the Bible was not a denominational book.

Justice Fisher then referred briefly to the Common Schools Act. He concluded that it was essentially the same as the Parish Schools Act, with the only real difference that school assessment became mandatory. He also noted that the Common Schools Act did not provide directly for bible readings, but left the decision as to Bible readings to the Board of Education, which could enact a regulation on that issue. He stated that whether or not the Board enacted such a regulation did not affect the constitutionality of the Act as a whole. As a result, he concluded that the Common Schools Act was constitutional.

=== Concurring Reasons of Justice Wetmore ===
Justice Wetmore also issued concurring reasons. He agreed with the other members of the Court that the Common Schools Act was constitutional. However, he wanted to make it clear that in his opinion, the constitutionality of the Act was not affected by the regulations passed by the Board of Education. It might be that those regulations were not consistent with the Common Schools Act or with s. 93 of the Constitution Act 1867, but those issues were not before the Court in this proceeding, which was a challenge to the Common Schools Act itself. Justice Wetmore refrained from any comment on the regulations, leaving that to another day, if they were ever challenged.

== Decision of the Judicial Committee of the Privy Council ==
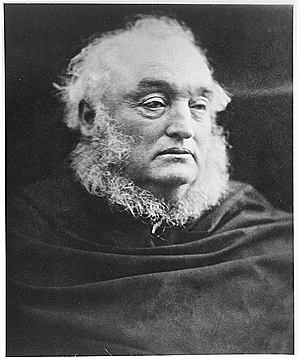
Lord Justice James, who gave the decision of the Judicial Committee upholding the Common Schools Act.

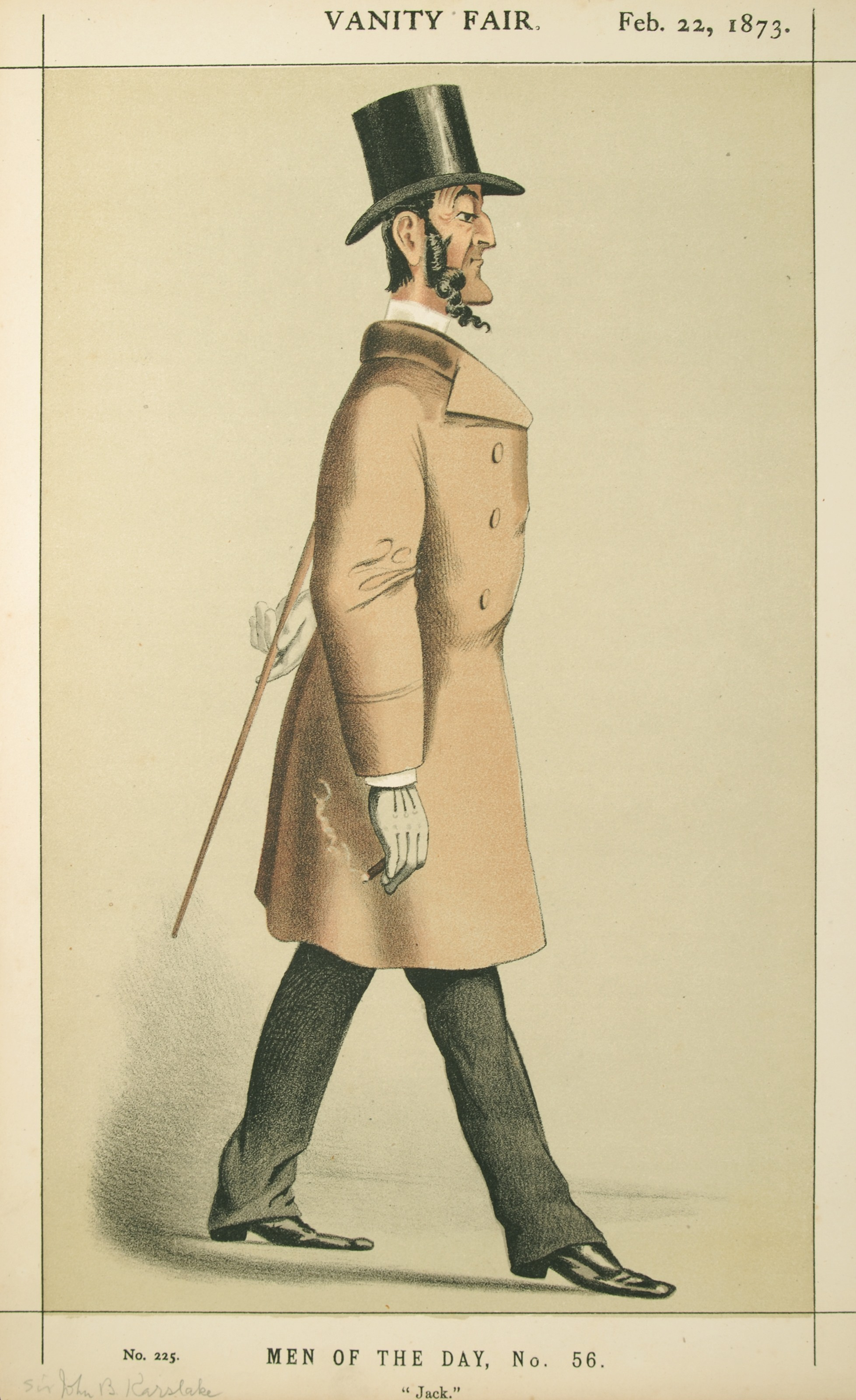
Sir John Burgess Karslake, QC, counsel for the province of New Brunswick

Maher appealed from the Supreme Court of New Brunswick to the Judicial Committee of the Privy Council, at that time the highest court in the British Empire. (The Supreme Court of Canada had not yet been created.) Maher was represented by Joseph Brown, Q.C., and Mr Duff of the New Brunswick bar. Sir John Burgess Karslake and Attorney General King, now also Premier of New Brunswick, appeared for the respondent town council, defending the provincial legislation.

The Judicial Committee heard the case on July 17, 1874. During oral argument, the judges repeatedly questioned whether the schools established under the Parish Schools Act could be termed "denominational," as those schools were not under the legal control of any particular religious denomination, and could change if the religious composition of the local electorate changed. After extensive questioning of counsel for the appellant during oral argument, the Judicial Committee did not call on counsel for the respondent and dismissed the appeal from the bench.

Lord Justice James gave the decision of the Committee. In short oral reasons, he quoted a lengthy passage from the reasons of Justice Fisher in the New Brunswick Supreme Court. James L.J. agreed with Justice Fisher that the schools established under the Parish Schools Act had not been denominational schools. He held that the fact that a school in a particular area could be under the control of one religious denomination through the electoral process, and later could be under the control of another denomination if there were changes in the local electorate, demonstrated that there was no legal right involved. The changes under the Common Schools Act therefore did not affect any legal right or privilege protected by s. 93(1) of the Constitution Act, 1867. He ruled that the Common Schools Act was constitutional.

As was the practice of the Judicial Committee at that time, James gave the decision for the entire committee, with no reasons from any of the other judges.

== Subsequent Treatment of the Decision ==
The oral reasons of James L.J. were not reported in the official reports, and are not part of the formal record of the Privy Council. The only source for the reasons for judgment is the text-book, Wheeler's Confederation Law of Canada, published in 1896. The author of that text explained that the reasons were taken from the shorthand notes of Mr. Groves, one of the solicitors for the respondent.

In 1892, the Judicial Committee again considered the scope of s. 93 of theConstitution Act, 1867, in the case of City of Winnipeg v Barrett. The case was argued and decided prior to the publication of the Wheeler text. The Judicial Committee did not refer to its own previous decision in Maher v Town Council of Portland. Instead, counsel in that case referred the Committee to the parallel decision of the Supreme Court of New Brunswick, Ex parte Renaud, which had been published in the New Brunswick case reports.

Following the publication of the reasons for the decision in Wheeler's Confederation Law of Canada, the Maher case has been cited approvingly by the courts. Both the Supreme Court and the Judicial Committee have relied upon the Maher decision.
