= Théotime Blanchard =

Canadian politician

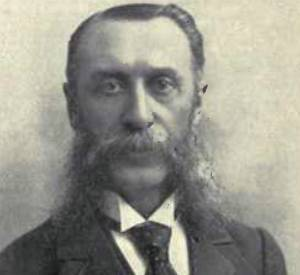
- Born: May 8, 1844; Caraquet, New Brunswick, Canada
- Died: March 11, 1911 (aged 66); Bathurst, New Brunswick, Canada
- Resting place: Saint-Pierre-aux-Liens Cemetery, Caraquet, NB
- Education: Caraquet common school
- Occupations: Teacher, farmer, merchant, politician
- Political party: Conservative
- Spouse: Marie Gauvin
- Children: 3 sons, 1 daughter
- Parent(s): Agapit Blanchard & Anne-Marie Poirier

Théotime Blanchard (May 8, 1844 – March 11, 1911) was a teacher, farmer, merchant and politician in the Province of New Brunswick, Canada. He represented Gloucester County from 1870 to 1875 and from 1892 to 1894 in the Legislative Assembly of New Brunswick and Gloucester in the House of Commons of Canada from 1894 to 1900 as a Conservative member.

He was born in Caraquet, New Brunswick, the son of Agapit Blanchard and Anne-Marie Poirier, and the grandson of Tranquille Blanchard. He taught school in Neguac and in Caraquet. In 1867, he married Marie Gauvin. Blanchard was later named a justice of the peace.

A Roman Catholic, in the New Brunswick Legislative Assembly he helped lead the opposition to the Common Schools Act of 1871 that banned religious instruction in the province's school system based on the principle of Separation of church and state. Blanchard resigned his seat in the assembly and was appointed inspector of weights and measures for Restigouche County in 1876. From 1887 to 1892, he served as customs inspector at Caraquet. Blanchard was the first Acadian elected to the provincial assembly and the Canadian House of Commons from Gloucester County. He was defeated by Onésiphore Turgeon when he ran for reelection in 1900 and again in 1904. He died in Bathurst at the age of 66 after being injured in a vehicle accident.

== Electoral record ==
1900 Canadian federal election: Gloucester
Party	Candidate	Votes	%	±%
Liberal	Onésiphore Turgeon	2,311	59.96	+30.14
Conservative	Théotime Blanchard	1,315	34.12	-16.81
Independent	R. Carr Harris	228	5.92	
Total valid votes		3,854	100.00	

1896 Canadian federal election: Gloucester
Party	Candidate	Votes	%	±%
Conservative	Théotime Blanchard	1,947	50.93	-4.36
Liberal	Onésiphore Turgeon	1,140	29.82	-14.89
Independent	Robert Young	736	19.25	
Total valid votes		3,823	100.00	

Note: Change in popular vote is calculated from popular vote in the 1891 general election.

By-election on 5 May 1894 On Kennedy Burns being called to the Senate, 21 March 1893
Party	Candidate	Votes
Conservative	Théotime Blanchard	acclaimed

== See also ==
- Louis Mailloux Affair
