= John Young (York County, New Brunswick politician) =

Canadian politician (1854–1934)

John A. Young

Member of the Legislative Assembly of New Brunswick
- In office 1908–1925
- Constituency: York

Personal details
- Born: March 26, 1854 Taymouth, New Brunswick
- Died: July 28, 1934 (aged 80) Devon, New Brunswick
- Party: Conservative Party of New Brunswick
- Spouse: Jane Anne Mullan
- Children: nine
- Occupation: farmer

John A. Young (March 26, 1854 – July 28, 1934) was a Canadian politician. He served in the Legislative Assembly of New Brunswick as member of the Conservative party representing York County from 1908 to 1925.
