= Jean George Robichaud =

Canadian politician

Jean George Robichaud (July 26, 1883 – August 6, 1969) was a fish merchant and political figure in New Brunswick. He represented Gloucester County in the Legislative Assembly of New Brunswick from 1917 to 1922 and Gloucester in the House of Commons of Canada from 1922 to 1926 as a Liberal member.

He was born in Shippegan, New Brunswick, the son of George Robichaud and Philomene de Grasse. In 1909, he married Amanda Boudreau. Robichaud served as a member of the county council from 1913 to 1915.

His son Hédard and his great-nephew Fernand Robichaud both served in the House of Commons and the Senate of Canada.

1925 Canadian federal election: Gloucester
Party	Candidate	Votes	%	±%
Liberal	Jean George Robichaud	6,254	54.26	-18.71
Conservative	Joseph Benoît Hachey	5,272	45.74	+18.71
Total valid votes		11,526	100.00	

Note: Change in popular vote is calculated from popular vote in the 1921 general election.

By-election on 20 November 1922 On Onésiphore Turgeon's acceptance of an office of emolument under the Crown, 26 October 1922
Party	Candidate	Votes
Liberal	Jean George Robichaud	acclaimed
