= Kent County, New Brunswick =

County in New Brunswick, Canada

Coordinates: 46°35′N 64°48′W

Kent
- County
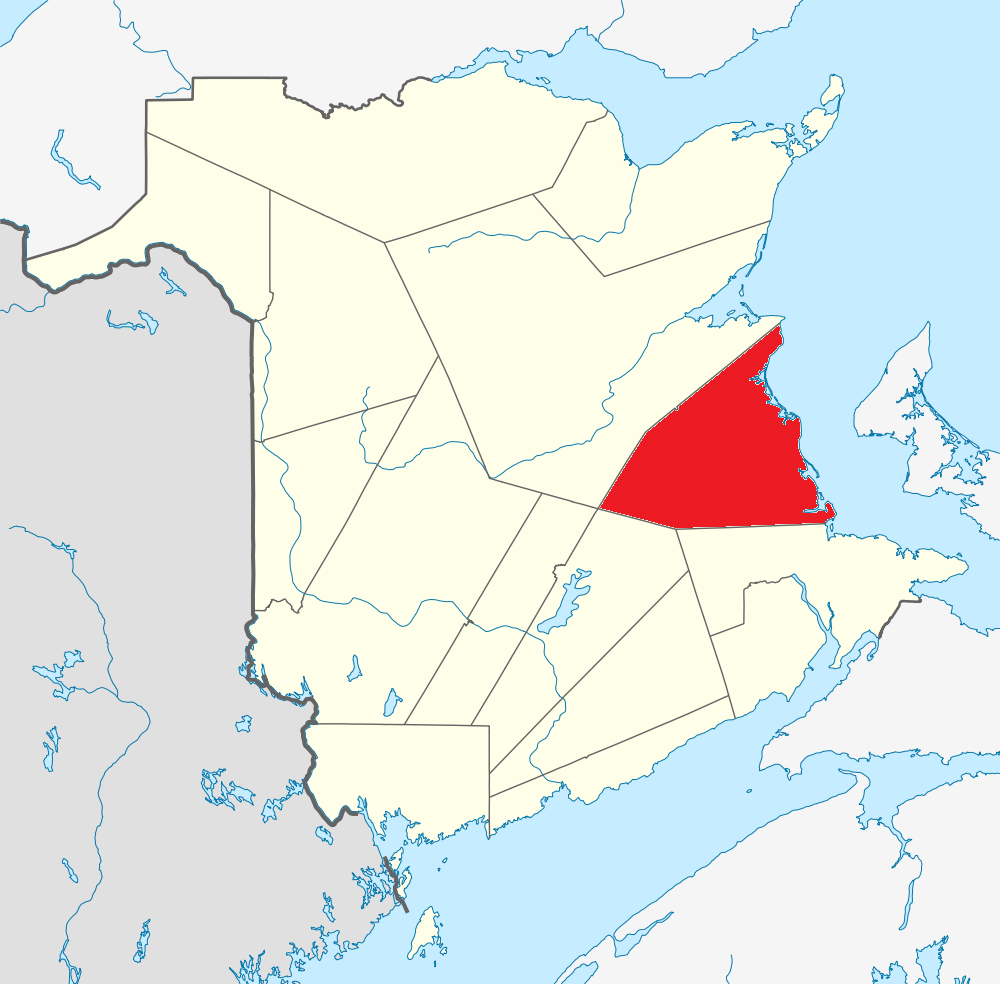
- Location within New Brunswick.
- Country: Canada
- Province: New Brunswick
- Established: 1826

Area
  - Land: 4,550.38 km^{2} (1,756.91 sq mi)

Population (2021)
  - Total: 32,169
  - Density: 7.1/km^{2} (18/sq mi)
  - Change 2016–2021: ▲5.6%
  - Dwellings: 16,274
- Time zone: UTC-4 (AST)
  - Summer (DST): UTC-3 (ADT)
- Area code: 506

Kent County (2021 population 32,169) is located in east-central New Brunswick, Canada. The county features a unique blend of cultures including Mi'kmaq, Acadian, and English. Some larger tourist attractions include the dune de Bouctouche, Kouchibouguac National Park, and Bonar Law Commons.

Federally, it is split between the ridings of Beauséjour, represented by Dominic LeBlanc of the Liberal Party of Canada and Miramichi—Grand Lake, represented by Jake Stewart of the Conservative Party of Canada. Provincially, it is split between the electoral districts of Kent North and Kent South.

== History ==
Established in 1826 from Northumberland County: named for Prince Edward, Duke of Kent and Strathearn (1767–1820) and the father of Queen Victoria.

== Census subdivisions ==
=== Communities ===
There are five municipalities within Kent County (listed by 2016 population):

Official name	Designation	Area km^{2}	Population	Parish
Bouctouche	Town	18.09	2,361	Wellington
Saint-Antoine	Village	6.32	1,733	Dundas
Richibucto	Town	11.93	1,266	Richibucto
Saint-Louis-de-Kent	Village	2.00	856	Saint-Louis
Rexton	Village	6.18	830	Richibucto

=== First Nations ===
There are three First Nations reserves in Kent County (listed by 2016 population):

Official name	Designation	Area km^{2}	Population	Parish
Richibucto 15	Reserve	12.18	1,937	Weldford
Indian Island 28	Reserve	0.28	138	Richibucto
Buctouche 16	Reserve	0.35	96	Wellington

Note – Richibucto 15, formerly Big Cove Band is now called Elsipogtog First Nation

=== Parishes ===
The county is subdivided into twelve parishes (listed by 2016 population):

Official name	Area km^{2}	Population	Municipalities	Unincorporated communities
Dundas	174.63	3,914		Cormierville / Caissie Cape / Grande-Digue / Guguen / Lower-Guguen / Notre-Dame / White's Settlement
Wellington	184.32	3,079	Bouctouche (town); Buctouche 16 (reserve)	Buctouche Baie / Buctouche-Sud / Caissie-Village / Chockpish / Cocagne / Collette-Village / Grand Saint-Antoine / Maria-de-Kent / McIntosh Hill / McKees Mills / Saint-David / Sainte-Anne-de-Kent / Saint-Édouard-de-Kent / Saint-François-de-Kent / Saint-Gabriel-de-Kent / Saint-Grégoire / Saint-Jean-Baptiste / Saint-Joseph-de-Kent / Saint-Maurice / Saint-Pierre-de-Kent / Saint-Thomas-de-Kent / St. Gabriel-de-Kent / Ste. Anne De Kent / Upper Saint-Maurice / / Village-des-Arsenault / Village-Sainte-Croix / Village-Saint-Irénée / Ward Corner / Wellington
Saint-Charles	174.78	1,997		Aldouane / Aldouane Station / Grande-Aldouane / Kent Lake / Kent Lake Siding / Lower Saint-Charles / Petite-Aldouane / Saint-Charles / Saint-Charles-Nord / Saint-Ignace Siding
Saint Mary	238.44	1,972	Saint-Antoine (village)	Bastarache / Champdoré / Coates Mills / Dollard Settlement / Fisher Hill / Kent Boom / McNairn / Murphy Settlement / Roy / Saint-Cyrille / Saint-Fabien / Saint-Lazare / Sainte-Marie-de-Kent / South Saint-Norbert / Upper Buctouche
Richibucto	249.05	1,887	Richibucto (town); Rexton (village); Indian Island 28 (reserve)	Bedec / Bells Mills / Cap-de-Richibouctou / Cap-Lumière / Côte-Sainte-Anne / East Galloway / Galloway / Jardineville / Peters Mills / Petit-Chockpish / Pirogue / Richibucto Village Cape / Richibucto-Village / Saint-Charles Station / Sainte-Anne-de-Kent / Village-La-Prairie / West Galloway
Saint-Louis	258.74	1,802	Saint-Louis-de-Kent (village)	Bretagneville / Camerons Mill / Canisto Road / Cap-de-Saint-Louis / Chemin Canisto / Desherbiers / Guimond-Village / Petit-Large / Pont-du-Milieu / Saint-Ignace / Saint-Olivier
Weldford	611.30	1,338	Richibucto 15 (reserve)	Balla Philip / Bass River / Bass River Point / Beersville / Browns Yard / Bryants Corner / Cails Mills / Coal Branch / Clairville / East Branch / Fords Mills / Jailletville / Kent Junction / Saint-Joseph / Lower Main River / Molus River / Mundleville / Normandie / Saint-Norbert / Smiths Corner / South Branch / Targettville / Village-Saint Augustin / West Branch
Saint-Paul	228.72	842		Birch Ridge / Bon-Secours / Légerville / McLean Settlement / Saint-Paul / Sweeneyville / Terrains de L'Évêque / Village-des-Belliveau / Village-des-Cormier / Village-des-Léger
Acadieville	332.22	709		Acadie Siding / Acadieville / Barrieau / Branche du Nord / Centre-Acadie / Johnson Road / Noinville / Pineau / Richard-Village / Saint-Athanase / Saint-Luc / Vautour / Village-Saint-Jean / Village-Saint-Pierre
Carleton	435.95	708		Carleton / Claire-Fontaine / Fontaine / Kouchibouguac / Laketon / Middle Kouchibouguac / Pointe-Sapin / Pointe-Sapin-Centre / Rivière-au-Portage / Saint-Camille / South Kouchibouguac / Tweedie Brook
Harcourt	1,170.96	346		Adamsville / Coal Branch / Grangeville / Harcourt / Hébert / Mortimer / Saint-Sosime
Huskisson	369.33	15		Huskisson

== Demographics ==
Historical Census Data – Kent County, New Brunswick
Year	Pop.	±%
1991	31,694	—
1996	32,094	+1.3%
2001	31,383	−2.2%
2006	31,449	+0.2%
2011	30,833	−2.0%
2016	30,475	−1.2%
2021	32,169	+5.6%

As a census division in the 2021 Census of Population conducted by Statistics Canada, Kent County had a population of 32,169 living in 14,074 of its 16,274 total private dwellings, a change of 5.6% from its 2016 population of 30,475. With a land area of 4,550.38 km^{2} (1,756.91 sq mi), it had a population density of 7.1/km^{2} (18.3/sq mi) in 2021.

Canada census – Kent community profile

	2021	2016	2011
Population	32,169 (+5.6% from 2016)	30,475 (-1.2% from 2011)	30,833 (-2.0% from 2006)
Land area	4,550.38 km^{2} (1,756.91 sq mi)	4,552.55 km^{2} (1,757.75 sq mi)	4,552.55 km^{2} (1,757.75 sq mi)
Population density	7.1/km^{2} (18/sq mi)	6.7/km^{2} (17/sq mi)	6.8/km^{2} (18/sq mi)
Median age	52.0 (M: 51.6, F: 52.4)	50.5 (M: 50.2, F: 50.8)	47.7 (M: 47.5, F: 47.9)
Private dwellings	16,274 (total) 14,074 (occupied)	16,251 (total)	16,030 (total)
Median household income	$66,500	$54,123	$46,410

References: 2021 2016 2011

=== Language ===
The predominant language of the county is Acadian French, often spoken in its Chiac dialect.

Canada Census Mother Tongue – Kent County, New Brunswick
Census	Total	French			English			French & English			Other		
Year	Responses	Count	Trend	Pop %	Count	Trend	Pop %	Count	Trend	Pop %	Count	Trend	Pop %
2016	30,230	20,800	▼2.7%	68.81%	7,455	▲6.3%	24.66%	410	▼3.5%	1.37%	1,495	▼1.3%	4.95%
2011	30,285	21,355	▼4.4%	70.51%	6,990	▲6.1%	23.08%	425	▲18.1%	1.40%	1,515	▼12.2%	5.00%
2006	31,000	22,330	▼2.3%	72.03%	6,585	▲7.1%	21.24%	360	▼17.2%	1.16%	1,725	▲13.9%	5.56%
2001	30,965	22,865	▼4.1%	73.84%	6,150	▼0.6%	19.86%	435	▲50.0%	1.40%	1,515	▲17.4%	4.89%
1996	31,605	23,840	n/a	75.43%	6,185	n/a	19.57%	290	n/a	0.92%	1,290	n/a	4.08%

== Access routes ==
Highways and numbered routes that run through the county, including external routes that start or finish at the county limits:

- Highways
  - Route 11
- Principal Routes
  - Route 115
  - Route 116
  - Route 117
  - Route 126
  - Route 134
- Secondary Routes:
  - Route 465
  - Route 470
  - Route 475
  - Route 480
  - Route 485
  - Route 490
  - Route 495
- Secondary Routes:
  - Route 505
  - Route 510
  - Route 515
  - Route 525
  - Route 530
  - Route 535
- External Routes:
  - None

== See also ==
- List of communities in New Brunswick
- Royal eponyms in Canada
