= Harcourt Parish =

Harcourt
- Parish
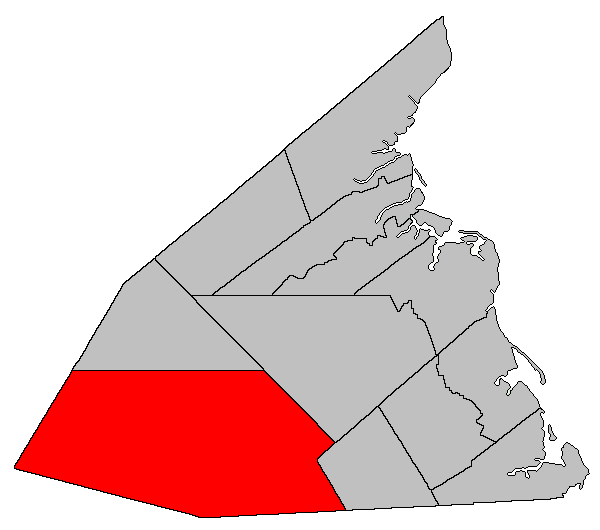
- Location within Kent County, New Brunswick.
- Coordinates: 46.47°N 65.25°W
- Country: Canada
- Province: New Brunswick
- County: Kent County
- Erected: 1827

Area
  - Land: 1,169.20 km^{2} (451.43 sq mi)

Population (2021)
  - Total: 346
  - Density: 0.3/km^{2} (0.78/sq mi)
  - Change 2016-2021: Steady
  - Dwellings: 237
- Time zone: UTC-4 (AST)
  - Summer (DST): UTC-3 (ADT)

Harcourt is a geographic parish in Kent County, New Brunswick, Canada. (Note: The Territorial Division Act divides the province into 152 parishes, the cities of Saint John and Fredericton, and one town of Grand Falls. The Interpretation Act clarifies that parishes include any local government within their borders.)

For governance purposes it is divided between the village of Five Rivers in along part of the eastern boundary, the village of and Grand Lake along Route 116 on the western boundary, with the Kent rural district comprising the remainder. Five Rivers and the rural district are members of the Kent Regional Service Commission and Grand Lake belongs to the Capital Region RSC.

Prior to the 2023 governance reform, the parish formed the southern part of the local service district of the parish of Harcourt. (Note: Although the provincial regulation named only Harcourt Parish, zoning maps released by the Kent RSC showed that Huskisson Parish was part of the Harcourt Parish LSD, reflecting the historic inclusion of Huskisson Parish for statistical purposes.)

== Origin of name ==
The parish was named in honour of Earl Harcourt, a Field Marshal of the British Army at the time of its erection and a friend and frequent correspondent of Lieutenant Governor Howard Douglas.

== History ==
Harcourt was erected from unassigned territory south of the Richibucto River in 1827, comprising a much shallower parish than today.

In 1845 Kent County annexed all of Northumberland County behind it. The wording of existing legislation implicitly adds the annexed area to Harcourt.

In 1850 the northern boundary was explicitly set, removing territory north of the North Forks of the Richibucto River.

In 1883 part of Harcourt east of the railway was added to Sainte-Marie Parish.

== Boundaries ==
Harcourt Parish is bounded:

- on the north by a line running due east and west from the mouth of Jimmy Graham Fork on the Richibucto River;
- on the east by a line running north 22º west, based on the magnet of 1867, (Note: Magnetic declination at the time was about 21º west.) from a point on the Westmorland County line twenty miles (32 kilometres) west of the northern tip of Shediac Island, running southerly from the north line of the parish to the northern line of Saint-Paul Parish, then southwesterly along the prolongation of a line running southwesterly 68º from the mouth of the Rivière Chockpish-nord to the Canadian National Railway line running alongside Route 126, then southerly to the Westmorland County line;
- on the south by the Westmorland County line;
- on the west by the Kent County and Northumberland County lines.

== Communities ==
Communities at least partly within the parish; bold indicates an incorporated municipality

- Adamsville
- Coal Branch
- Grangeville
- Harcourt
- Hébert
- Mortimer
- Saint-Sosime

== Bodies of water ==
Bodies of water (Note: Not including brooks, ponds or coves.) at least partly in the parish:

- Buctouche River (Upper North Branch)
- Canaan River (Upper North Branch)
- Coal Branch River
- Richibucto River
- Sabbies River
- Salmon River
- Glen Branch
- Second Branch
- Big Forks Stream
- Forks Stream
- Lake Stream
- Little Forks Stream
- Adamsville Lake
- Birch Ridge Lake
- Coal Branch Lake
- Spectacle Lake
- Trout Brook Lake

== Other notable places ==
Parks, historic sites, and other noteworthy places at least partly in the parish.

- Canaan Bog Protected Natural Area
- Lake Stream Protected Natural Area
- Trout Brook Protected Natural Area
- West Branch Coy Brook Protected Natural Area

== Demographics ==
=== Population ===
**Population trend**

Census	Population	Change (%)
2016	346	▼11.3%
2011	390	▼8.5%
2006	426	▼4.9%
2001	448	▼14.7%
1996	525	▲17.7%
1991	446	N/A

=== Language ===
**Mother tongue (2016)**

Language	Population	Pct (%)
English only	265	77.9%
French only	70	20.6%
Both English and French	5	1.5%
Other languages	0	0%

== See also ==
- List of parishes in New Brunswick
