= List of people from Kent County, New Brunswick =

This is a list of notable people from Kent County, New Brunswick. Although not everyone in this list was born in Kent County, they all live or have lived in Kent County and have had significant connections to the communities.

Full name	Community	Famous for	Birth	Death	Other
Joël Bourgeois	Grande-Digue	sports	1971		3000m steeplechase runner, gold medalist at the 1999 Pan American Games, silver medalist at the 2003 Pan American Games, and two time Olympian, in the 1996 and 2000 editions of the Games
Paul Dwayne	Bouctouche	singer-songwriter	1964	2024	
Christian Kit Goguen	Saint-Charles	singer-songwriter	1978		
K. C. Irving	Bouctouche	industrialist	1899	1992	
Bonar Law	Five Rivers	prime minister of the United Kingdom	1858	1923	First British prime minister born outside the British Isles
Antonine Maillet	Bouctouche	author	1929	2025	Prix Goncourt winner
Robert Maillet	Sainte-Marie-de-Kent	wrestler, actor	1969		
Mia Martina	Saint-Ignace	singer	1982		
Louis Robichaud	Champdoré	premier of New Brunswick	1925	2005	
Donald J. Savoie	Bouctouche	political analyst	1947		
Margery Ward	Bass River	politician	1942	1993	

== See also ==
- List of people from New Brunswick
