= Richibucto Parish =

Richibucto
- Parish
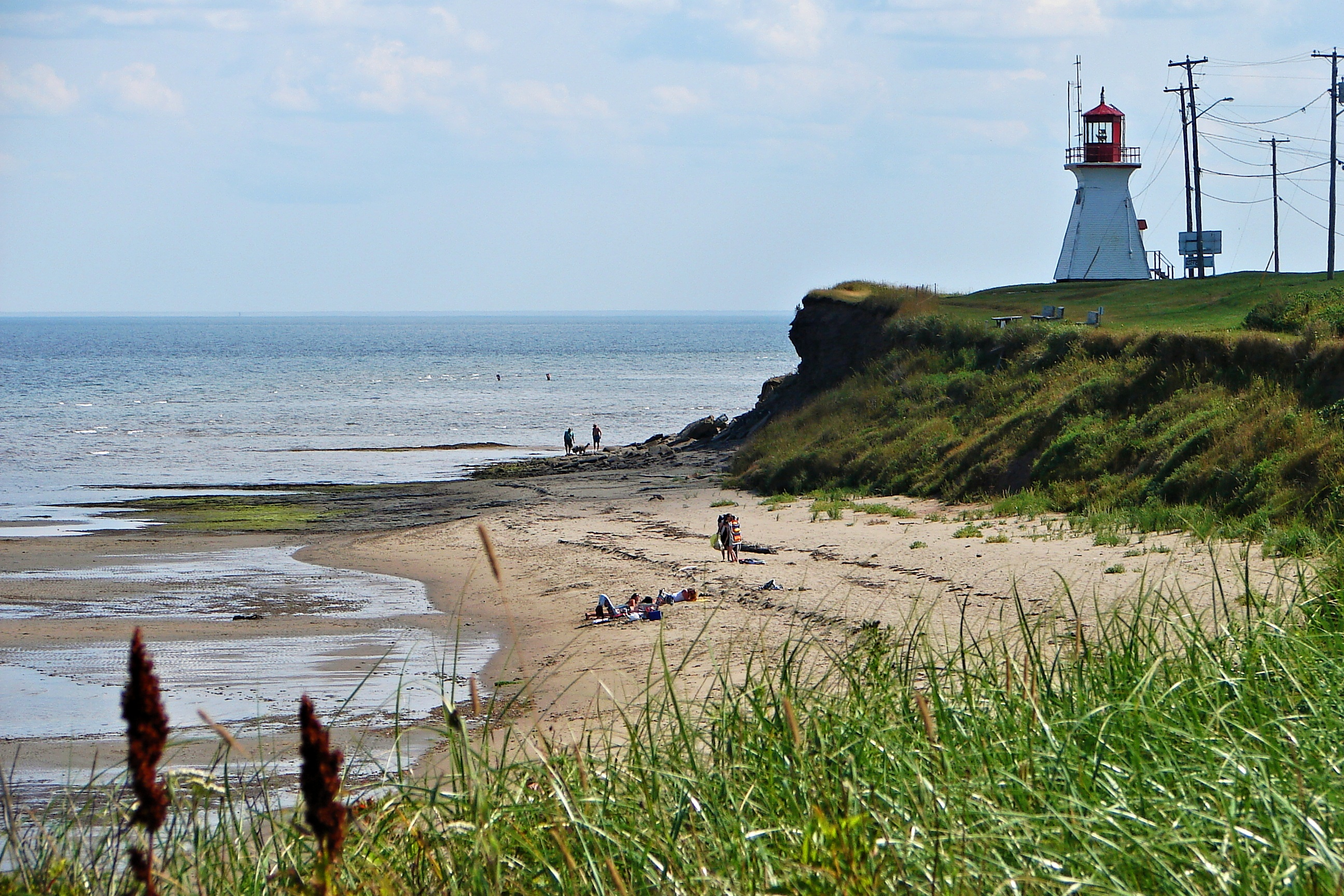
- Cap-Lumière

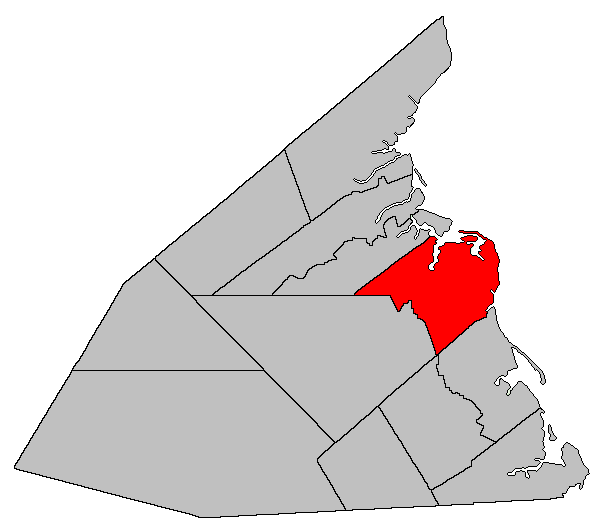
- Location within Kent County, New Brunswick
- Coordinates: 46.6175°N 64.79°W
- Country: Canada
- Province: New Brunswick
- County: Kent County
- Erected: 1827

Area
  - Land: 249.21 km^{2} (96.22 sq mi)

Population (2021)
  - Total: 2,085
  - Density: 8.4/km^{2} (22/sq mi)
  - Change 2016-2021: ▲11.4%
  - Dwellings: 1,162
- Time zone: UTC-4 (AST)
  - Summer (DST): UTC-3 (ADT)
- Figures do not include portions within the town of Richibucto, the village of Rexton, and the Indian Island 28 Indian reserve Population change reflects revised 2016 figure

Richibucto (originally Liverpool) is a geographic parish in Kent County, New Brunswick, Canada. (Note: The Territorial Division Act divides the province into 152 parishes, the cities of Saint John and Fredericton, and one town of Grand Falls. The Interpretation Act clarifies that parishes include any local government within their borders.)

For governance purposes it is divided between the towns of Beaurivage and Grand-Bouctouche, the village of Five Rivers, and the Kent rural district, all of are members of the Kent Regional Service Commission, and the Indian Island 28 Indian reserve, which is not.

Prior to the 2023 governance reform, the parish was divided between the town of Richibucto, the village of Rexton, the Indian Island 28 Indian reserve, and the local service districts of Cap-de-Richibouctou, Sainte-Anne-de-Kent, and the parish of Richibucto. Richibucto and a border area west of it became part of Beaurivage, Rexton and most of the parish LSD part of Five Rivers, Sainte-Anne-de-Kent to Grand-Bouctouche, and Cap-de-Richibouctou to the rural district, with small exceptions along the various new borders.

== Origin of name ==
The parish was named for the Richibucto River, which in turn is of Mi'kmaq origin.

== History ==
Richibucto was erected from Carleton Parish as Liverpool parish in 1827. At the time it included modern Weldford Parish and all of Saint-Charles Parish south of the Saint-Charles River.

In 1832 the parish's name was changed to Richibucto.

In 1835 the southwestern part of the parish was erected as Weldford Parish.

In 1909 the newly erected Saint-Charles Parish included the settlements along the Kouchibouguacis River.

== Boundaries ==
Richibucto Parish is bounded:

- on the northwest by a line beginning on the northern line of Weldford Parish, near Aldouane Station Cross Road, then running northeasterly to a point on the northern boundary of the town of Richibucto about midway between Route 11 and Route 134, at the corner of a land grant, then northeasterly along the grant line to the rear of a grant on Northwest Branch, then southeasterly to the mouth of Thomas Brook, down Northwest Branch to Richibucto River, and out through Richibucto Harbour to Northumberland Strait;
- on the east by Northumberland Strait;
- on the south by the Chockpish River upstream as far as the mouth of the Rivière Chockpish-nord, then south 68º west (Note: By the magnet of 1850, when declination in the area was between 21º and 22º west of north.) to a point slightly west of East Branch Road;
- on the west by a line running northwesterly to the mouth of Black Brook on the East Branch St. Nicholas River, then down the East Branch St. Nicholas and the St. Nicholas River to its mouth, then up the Richibucto River to the eastern line of the Richibucto 15 Indian reserve and along the reserve to its northernmost corner, then due west to the starting point.

== Communities ==
Communities at least partly within the parish. bold indicates an incorporated municipality or Indian reserve

- Bedec
- Bells Mills
- Caissie-Village
- Cap-Lumière
- Côte-Sainte-Anne
- East Galloway
- Galloway
- **Indian Island 28**
- Jardineville
- Peters Mills
- Petit-Chockpish
- Pirogue
- **Rexton**
- **Richibucto**
- Richibucto-Village
- Saint-Charles Station
- Village-La-Prairie
- West Galloway

== Bodies of water ==
Bodies of water (Note: Not including brooks, ponds or coves.) at least partly within the parish.

- Rivière à Étienne
- Chockpish River
- Chockpish-nord River
- Rivière des Vaches
- Rivière du Cap
- Richibucto River
- St. Nicholas River
- Beatties Creek
- Big Cove Creek
- Childs Creek
- Gaspereau Creek
- McAlmon Creek
- Mill Creek
- Mooneys Creek
- Watering Creek
- Weldon Creek
- Geddes Lake
- Northumberland Strait
- Village Bay
- Richibucto Harbour
- Passe de l'Île
- Richibucto Gully

== Islands ==
Islands at least partly within the parish.

- Indian Island
- McAlmon Island

== Other notable places ==
Parks, historic sites, and other noteworthy places at least partly within the parish.

- Bonar Law Provincial Park

== Demographics ==
Parish population total does not include incorporated municipalities and Indian reserve

=== Population ===
**Population trend**

| Census | Population | Change (%) |
|---|---|---|
| 2016 | 1,887 | ▼5.0% |
| 2011 | 1,986 | ▼1.8% |
| 2006 | 2,022 | ▲1.3% |
| 2001 | 1,997 | ▼2.3% |
| 1996 | 2,045 | ▲2.8% |
| 1991 | 1,990 | N/A |

=== Language ===
**Mother tongue (2016)**

| Language | Population | Pct (%) |
|---|---|---|
| French only | 1,120 | 59.4% |
| English only | 665 | 35.3% |
| Other languages | 65 | 3.5% |
| Both English and French | 35 | 1.9% |

== See also ==
- List of parishes in New Brunswick
