= Village-Saint-Augustin, New Brunswick =

Village-Saint-Augustin
- Location of Village-Saint-Augustin in New Brunswick
- Coordinates: 46.414606°N 65.144033°W
- Country: Canada
- Province: New Brunswick
- County: Kent County
- Lowest elevation: 0 m (0 ft)
- Time zone: UTC-4 (Atlantic (AST))
  - Summer (DST): UTC-3 (ADT)
- Area code: 506

Village-Saint-Augustin is a small community in Weldford and Harcourt Parishes, and located 3.16 km NE of Adamsville, on the road to Beersville. The area is now home to a few Acadian families.

== History ==
Village-Saint-Augustin had a post office from 1912 to 1951. At one time it included the settlement of Adamsville East.

== See also ==
- List of communities in New Brunswick
