= Richibucto (disambiguation) =

Richibucto may refer to:

- Richibucto, a town in New Brunswick, Canada
- Richibucto Parish, New Brunswick, a parish in Canada
- Richibucto River, in eastern New Brunswick
