= Rexton, New Brunswick =

Rexton
- Rexton behind the Richibucto River

- Seal
- Motto: Progressio et Concordia (Latin) "Progress and Concord"
- Location of Rexton in New Brunswick
- Coordinates: 46.633333°N 64.866667°W
- Country: Canada
- Province: New Brunswick
- County: Kent County
- Municipality: Five Rivers
- Founded: 1825 by John Jardine
- Incorporated: November 9, 1966

Area
  - Land: 6.29 km^{2} (2.43 sq mi)

Population (2021)
  - Total: 874
  - Density: 138.9/km^{2} (360/sq mi)
  - Change (2016–21): ▲5.3%
- Time zone: UTC-4 (AST)
  - Summer (DST): UTC-3 (ADT)
- Canadian Postal code: E4W
- Area code: 506
- Website: www.villageofrexton.com

Rexton is a former village in Kent County, New Brunswick, Canada. It was a village in its own right until the end of 2022 and is now part of the village of Five Rivers.

== History ==
Situated on the Richibucto River, the village was originally inhabited by Mi'kmaq First Nations, many of whose descendants still reside in the nearby Elsipogtog First Nation, formerly referred to as the Big Cove Band. Acadian settlers colonized the general area in the 18th century, in places such as Bouctouche, Miramichi and Richibucto Village.

The first English-speaking settler was Thomas Powel who arrived in 1790. There was considerable colonization by English shipbuilders, Scottish merchants and Irish immigrants followed, including many Irish Protestants who arrived to work in the Jardine Shipbuilding Yards around the year 1819. They eventually cleared enough land to receive land grants following the 1820s survey by a Mr. Layton conducted around the Molus River area of nearby Weldford Parish, New Brunswick and the size of Elsipogtog First Nation was reduced to the current boundaries.

Two ships brought the majority of the settlers here from Scotland, one being the Dickies, captained by Simon Graham, and the other was the Isabella, sailed by Captain Thomas Carruthers.

Fishing, lumbering and shipbuilding flourished throughout the 19th century. The first bridge over the Richibucto River was completed there in 1850, improving commerce and communications in the region.

The settlement was known from about 1825 as Kingston, but in 1901, the name was changed to Rexton. This was probably to avoid confusion with other Kingstons, particularly Kingston, Kings County, New Brunswick, which still carries the name.

On 1 January 2023, Rexton annexed parts of five local service districts to form the new village of Five Rivers. The community's name remains in official use.

== Notable people ==
Rexton (Kingston at the time) was the birthplace of Bonar Law, Prime Minister of the United Kingdom in 1922–1923. Until the election of Boris Johnson in 2019, who was born in New York City, Bonar Law was the only British Prime Minister to be born outside the British Isles. His name is honoured at a recently upgraded community attraction, Bonar Law Common, and also at Bonar Law Memorial High School in Rexton. His father Rev. James Law was the Minister for St. Andrew's Church in Rexton for many years. William John Bowser, Premier of British Columbia (1915–1916), was born in Rexton. Former Premier of New Brunswick, Shawn Graham, was raised in Rexton.

== Demographics ==
In the 2021 Census of Population conducted by Statistics Canada, Rexton had a population of 874 living in 396 of its 446 total private dwellings, a change of 5.3% from its 2016 population of 830. With a land area of 6.29 km^{2} (2.43 sq mi), it had a population density of 139.0/km^{2} (359.9/sq mi) in 2021.

Population trend

Census	Population	Change (%)
2016	830	▲1.5%
2011	818	▼5.1%
2006	862	▲6.4%
2001	810	▼10.8%
1996	908	▼3.4%
1991	940	▲1.5%
1986	926	▼0.2%
1981	928	N/A

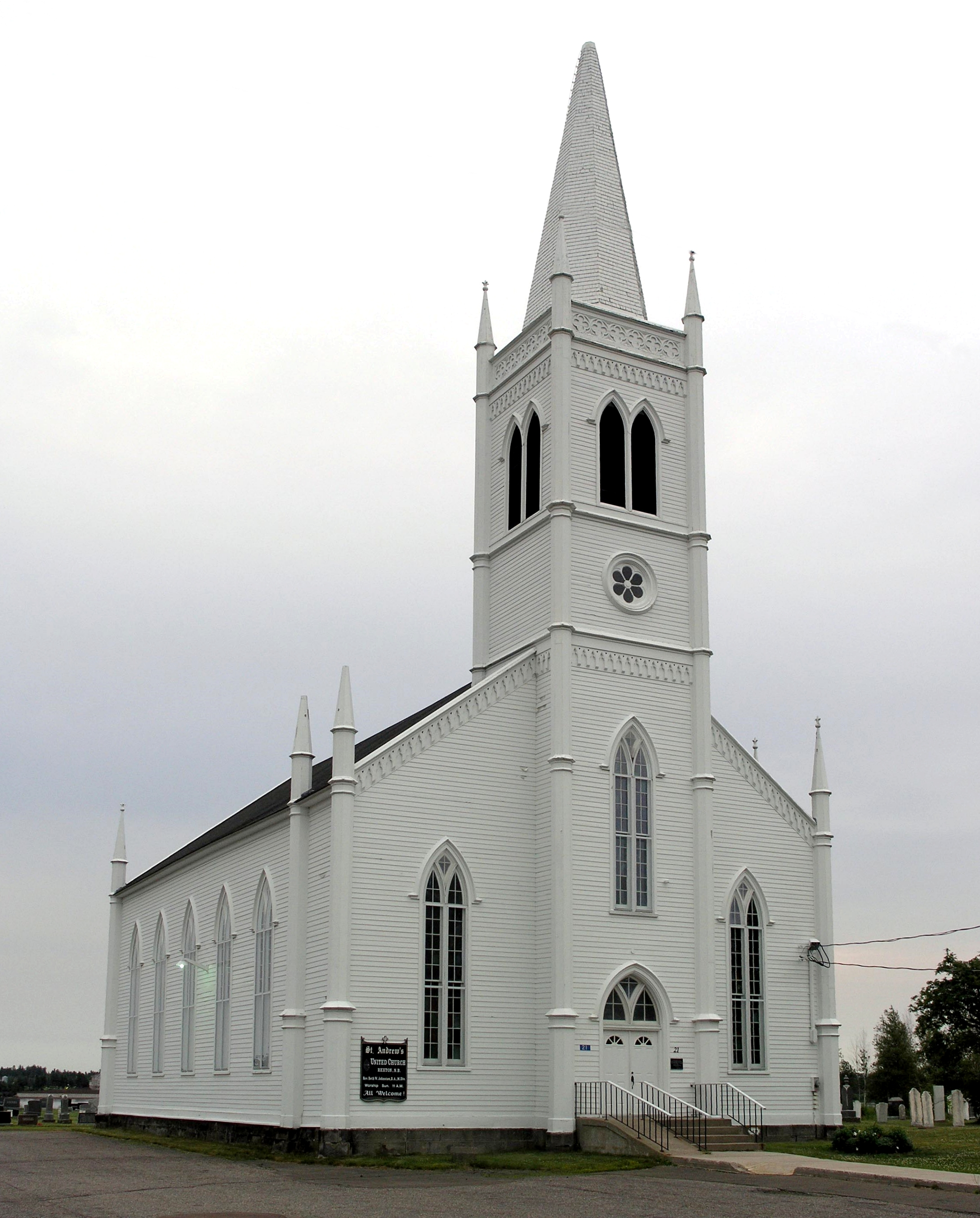
St. Andrew's United Church at Rexton

Religious make-up (2001)

Religion	Population	Pct (%)
Catholic	540	69.23%
Protestant	210	26.92%
No religious affiliation	25	3.20%

Income (2006)

Income type	By CAD
Per capita income	$21,807
Median Household Income	$34,301
Median Family Income	$47,115

Mother tongue language (2011)

Language	Population	Pct (%)
English only	530	67.51%
French only	230	29.30%
Non-official languages	10	1.27%
Multiple responses	15	1.91%

== See also ==
- List of communities in New Brunswick
- Royal eponyms in Canada
