= Evolve Festival =

Annual festival in New Brunswick

Coordinates: 45.551°N 61.788°W

- Genre: Rock, jazz, funk, world music, hip hop, bluegrass, electronica
- Locations: Jailletville, New Brunswick, Antigonish, Nova Scotia (2000-2016)
- Years active: 2000–present
- Founders: Joe MacEachern; Jim Dorey
- Website: evolvefestival.com

Evolve Festival is an annual multi-genre music and cultural festival in New Brunswick. The festival is dedicated to the promotion of sustainable living and environmental awareness. It uses renewable energy sources, recycled, and biodegradable products and endeavours to limit solid waste.

The festival originally took place near Antigonish, Nova Scotia, until 2016, when the festival's permit was revoked due to issues related to rampant drug use among attendees.; it subsequently relocated to Beersville, New Brunswick. In 2010, Evolve Festival won the CBC Radio 3 contest vote for "Best Festival In Canada".

The festival presents a diverse lineup of rock, jazz, funk, world music, hip hop, bluegrass and electronica performers.

== History ==
The festival was first conceived by Joe MacEachern, a resident of Antigonish, who then recruited Jim Dorey of Toronto to become the second founding member of Evolve Tribe. Jay Cleary joined the duo as the festival publicist and was able to raise significant export development funding from the Nova Scotia Government to develop the festival as a Nova Scotia Tourist Attraction.

The first Evolve Festival was held in 2000 in Antigonish.

In 2005, the team was joined by longtime supporter and Evolve Tribe member Jonas Colter of Fredericton, New Brunswick. In 2006, Jim Dorey sold his shares to Jonas and Joe; in 2008, Joe sold his shares to Jonas in order to pursue a degree in sociology.

In 2016, the festival moved to Beersville, New Brunswick, after the Municipality of the County of Antigonish revoked Evolve's permit due to issues involving the lack of a medical plan.

== Performers ==
Performers at the festival have included k-os, Edward Sharpe and the Magnetic Zeros, The Trews, Michael Franti, Spearhead, !!!, Battles, Beardyman, TWRP, Black Tiger Sex Machine, Brazilian Girls, Danny Brown, Chali 2na, Delhi 2 Dublin, Do Make Say Think, Dub FX, Easy Star All-Stars, Grandtheft, Moldylox, Hey Rosetta!, Holy Fuck, Man Man, Medeski Martin & Wood, Pretty Lights, Rezz, Rheostatics, Xavier Rudd, The Sheepdogs, Slowcoaster, The Jimmy Swift Band, Telesma, That 1 Guy, The Be Good Tanyas, Wintersleep, and Luther Wright and the Wrongs.

Elizabeth May of Green Party of Canada spoke at the 2007 event.

In addition to its main stage, the festival also features several smaller stages genres such as electronic, bass, and indie rock. There are smaller yurt stages highlighting smaller acts from around the world.

In 2010, over 115 acts performed.

== Controversy ==
According to CBC News and VICE, Evolve Festival has had a reputation for rampant drug use for most of its history.

In 2015, a 21-year-old man died from natural causes after attending the festival. Though the death was unrelated to the event itself, it brought the festival's drug policies into public interest as medical professionals raised concerns.

In December 2015, Evolve was issued a conditional permit by the Municipality of the County of Antigonish, with one of the conditions being a committed medical plan, developed and overseen by a physician by February 1, 2016. In 2016, the Municipality revoked the festival's permit after Evolve organizers were unable to satisfactorily address a medical plan as per their condition. Evolve was thereby forced to relocate from Antigonish, eventually finding a spot in New Brunswick instead.
