= New Brunswick Route 126 =

Highway in New Brunswick, Canada

Route 126

Route information
- Maintained by New Brunswick Department of Transportation
- Length: 121 km (75 mi)
- Existed: 1965.–present

Major junctions
- North end: Route 8 / Route 117 in Miramichi
- Route 2 (TCH) in Moncton; Route 15 in Moncton
- South end: Route 106 in Moncton

Location
- Country: Canada
- Province: New Brunswick
- Major cities: Miramichi, Moncton

Highway system
- Provincial highways in New Brunswick; Former routes
| ← Route 124 | → Route 127 |

Route 126 is a North/South provincial highway in the Canadian province of New Brunswick. The road runs from Route 117 intersection in Miramichi. The road has a length of approximately 121 kilometres, and services small, otherwise isolated rural communities. In these areas, the highway is often unofficially referred to as "Main Street." The road parallels a Canadian National Railway line directly to the east. When the highway enters Moncton it changes to Ensley Drive, then Mountain Road.

The road has many sections with minimal to no shoulders, and with the high-speed motor vehicle traffic of 80 kilometres per hour, and often more, it should be considered as very high risk for bicyclists.

== Intersecting routes ==
- Route 118 in Miramichi
- Route 440 in Nouvelle-Arcadie
- Route 480 in Acadie Siding
- Route 116 in Harcourt and Mortimer
- Route 465 in Coal Branch
- Route 515 in Hebert
- Route 485 in Canaan
- Route 2 in Moncton
- Route 128 in Moncton

== River crossings ==
- Carding Mill Brook - Miramichi
- Barnaby River - Murray Settlement (2 crossings)
- Kouchibouguacis River - Kent Junction
- Richibucto River - Harcourt
- Canaan River - Canaan Station

== Communities along the Route ==
- Miramichi
- Nowlanville
- Barnaby River
- Murray Settlement
- Collette
- Nouvelle-Arcadie
- Acadie Siding
- Noinville
- Kent Junction
- Harcourt
- Grangeville
- Adamsville
- Coal Branch
- Birch Ridge
- Hebert
- Canaan Station
- Gallagher Ridge
- Indian Mountain
- Lutes Mountain
- Moncton

== See also ==
- List of New Brunswick provincial highways
