= Carleton Parish =

Carleton
- Parish
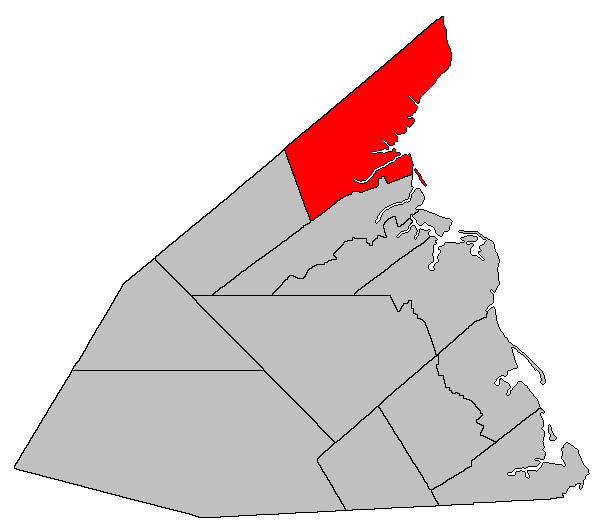
- Location within Kent County, New Brunswick.
- Coordinates: 46.805°N 65.065°W
- Country: Canada
- Province: New Brunswick
- County: Kent County
- Erected: 1814

Area
  - Land: 435.23 km^{2} (168.04 sq mi)

Population (2021)
  - Total: 764
  - Density: 1.8/km^{2} (4.7/sq mi)
  - Change 2016-2021: ▲7.9%
  - Dwellings: 413
- Time zone: UTC-4 (AST)
  - Summer (DST): UTC-3 (ADT)

Carleton is a geographic parish in Kent County, New Brunswick, Canada. (Note: The Territorial Division Act divides the province into 152 parishes, the cities of Saint John and Fredericton, and one town of Grand Falls. The Interpretation Act clarifies that parishes include any local government within their borders.)

For governance purposes it is mainly part of the Kent rural district, which is a member of the Kent Regional Service Commission. Small areas on the southern and western boundaries belong to the town of Beaurivage and the village of Nouvelle-Arcadie, respectively. (Note: Maps still visible as thumbnails show the current and previous governance boundaries.)

Prior to the 2023 governance reform, the parish was divided between the local service districts of Pointe-Sapin, east of the national park, and the parish of Carleton, to its west.

== Origin of name ==
The parish was named for Thomas Carleton, first Governor of New Brunswick.

== History ==
Carleton was erected in 1814 as part of Northumberland County from Newcastle Parish. It included Acadieville, Richibucto, Saint-Louis, and Weldford Parishes.

In 1827 Richibucto was erected as Liverpool Parish, including modern Weldford Parish.

In 1845 the boundary with Northumberland County was adjusted, adding area to Carleton.

In 1855 Saint-Louis was erected as Palmerston Parish.

In 1857 the boundary with Palmerston was adjusted to run along grant lines.

In 1876 Acadieville was erected as its own parish.

In 1888 a small area at Point Escuminac was returned to Northumberland County.

== Boundaries ==
Carleton Parish is bounded:

- on the northwest by the Northumberland County line;
- on the east by Northumberland Strait, Kouchibouguac Bay, and Saint-Louis Bay;
- on the south by a line beginning on the shore of Kouchibouguac Bay at the prolongation of the southern line of a grant about 1.5 kilometres south of the mouth of Ruisseau des Major in Kouchibouguac National Park, then running southwesterly along the grant line and its prolongation past Ruisseau des Major to the southernmost corner of the second grant, then northerly to the southern line of a grant straddling the Kouchibouguac River, then along the southern lines of five river grants until it strikes the prolongation of the starting grant line, then westerly along the prolongation to Route 134, then northwesterly along Route 134 to the southern line of Kouchibouguac River grants, then southwesterly along the northern line of two grants on either side of Route 11 and a third grant, to the northwestern corner of the third grant, then south 75º 30' west (Note: By the magnet of 1857, when declination in the area was between 21º and 22º west of north.) past Route 480 to the prolongation of the eastern line of a grant on the eastern edge of Saint-Luc;
- on the west by the eastern line of a grant in Saint-Luc prolonged southerly to the Saint-Louis Parish line and northerly to the Northumberland County line.

== Communities ==
Communities at least partly within the parish;

- Claire-Fontaine
- Fontaine
- Kouchibouguac
- Laketon
- Loggiecroft
- Middle Kouchibouguac
- Pointe-Sapin
- Pointe-Sapin-Centre
- Rivière-au-Portage
- Saint-Camille
- South Kouchibouguac
- Tweedie Brook

== Bodies of water ==
Bodies of water (Note: Not including brooks, ponds or coves.) at least partly in the parish:

- Rivière à l'Anguille
- Black River
- Escuminac River
- Fontaine River
- Kouchibouguac River
- Portage River
- Portage-sud River
- Kouchibouguac Bay
- Le Barachois
- Little Gully
- Lac à Livain
- Lac des Irlandais
- Hells Gate Lake
- Laketon Lake
- Round Lake
- Sullivans Lake

== Other notable places ==
Parks, historic sites, and other noteworthy places at least partly in the parish.

- Black River Protected Natural Area
- Kouchibouguac National Park

== Demographics ==
Revised census figures based on the 2023 local governance reforms have not been released.

=== Population ===
Population trend

Census	Population	Change (%)
2016	708	▼8.1%
2011	770	▼14.6%
2006	902	▼11.5%
2001	1,019	▼8.4%
1996	1,112	▼6.2%
1991	1,186	N/A

=== Language ===
Mother tongue (2016)

Language	Population	Pct (%)
French only	575	81.0%
English only	120	16.9%
Both English and French	5	0.7%
Other languages	10	1.4%

== See also ==
- List of parishes in New Brunswick
