= Roland McLenahan =

Canadian ice hockey player and coach

- Born: October 26, 1921 Fredericton, New Brunswick, Canada
- Died: April 23, 1984 (aged 62) Fredericton, New Brunswick, Canada
- Height: 5 ft 7 in (170 cm)
- Weight: 170 lb (77 kg; 12 st 2 lb)
- Position: Defence
- Shot: Left
- Played for: Detroit Red Wings
- Playing career: 1941–1957

Roland Joseph "Rollie" McLenahan (October 26, 1921 – April 23, 1984) was a Canadian professional ice hockey player and coach. He played 8 games in the National Hockey League for the Detroit Red Wings during the 1945–46 season. The rest of his career, which lasted from 1941 to 1957, was spent in the minor leagues.

McLenahan was a member of the AHL First All Star Team in 1950, and a member of the IHL First All-Star Team in 1954, 1955, and 1956. He retired from playing hockey following the 1956–1957 season.

== Post-retirement ==
From 1957 to 1958, he was head coach of the AHL's Rochester Americans, who won the Calder Cup that year. He later served as a Director for the Department of Youth for the Province of New Brunswick from 1961 to 1981. He was a scout for Montreal from 1960 to 1968, and a member of the Canada Games Council. McLenahan also served as director of the CAHA, and a director of Hockey Canada. He helped found the New Brunswick Sports Hall of Fame, and the New Brunswick Amateur Hockey Association.

In 1981, he was discovered to have lung cancer, but the cancer spread to his brain. He died in his native Fredericton, at the age of 62, on April 23, 1984, and was buried in the Fredericton Hermitage Cemetery. He was inducted into the New Brunswick Sports Hall of Fame in 1982 and in 2005, Krista Betts, a gold medal winner in Canadian Women's Wrestling at the Canada Games who is from the small farming community of Bass River, Weldford Parish, New Brunswick received the prestigious Roly McLenahan Award.

== Career statistics ==
=== Regular season and playoffs ===
			Regular season					Playoffs
Season	Team	League	GP	G	A	Pts	PIM	GP	G	A	Pts	PIM
1935–36	Marysville Royals	YCHL	—	—	—	—	—	2	0	0	0	4
1936–37	Devon Northsiders	YCHL	—	—	—	—	—	1	0	1	1	2
1937–38	Devon Northsiders	YCHL	4	6	2	8	8	—	—	—	—	—
1938–39	Fredericton Merchants	YCHL	12	12	5	17	—	—	—	—	—	—
1939–40	Windsor Mills	QAHA	—	—	—	—	—	—	—	—	—	—
1939–40	Windsor Mills	Al-Cup	—	—	—	—	—	2	0	0	0	2
1940–41	Guelph Biltmores	OHA	15	6	4	10	15	5	1	4	5	4
1941–42	Washington Eagles	EAHL	57	19	25	44	55	8	3	4	7	20
1942–43	Sudbury Tigers	NOHA	3	0	0	0	2	3	1	2	3	2
1942–43	Sudbury Wolves	Al-Cup	—	—	—	—	—	3	0	0	0	8
1943–44	Sudbury Open Pit Miners	NBHL	8	5	4	9	20	—	—	—	—	—
1943–44	Sudbury Open Pit Miners	Al-Cup	—	—	—	—	—	16	4	4	8	36
1944–45	Sudbury Tigers	NOHA	6	7	6	13	10	7	0	4	4	12
1945–46	Detroit Red Wings	NHL	8	2	1	3	10	2	0	0	0	0
1945–46	Indianapolis Capitals	AHL	39	7	13	20	32	—	—	—	—	—
1946–47	Cleveland Barons	AHL	64	6	17	23	55	4	0	0	0	2
1947–48	Hershey Bears	AHL	58	7	18	25	59	2	0	1	1	4
1948–49	Hershey Bears	AHL	64	15	33	48	86	11	4	6	10	8
1949–50	Hershey Bears	AHL	67	25	35	60	49	—	—	—	—	—
1950–51	Buffalo Bisons	AHL	65	11	33	44	33	4	1	2	3	8
1951–52	Fredericton Capitals	NBSHL	19	23	17	40	35	—	—	—	—	—
1952–53	Fredericton Capitals	NBSHL	9	11	6	17	30	6	5	5	10	8
1952–53	Sudbury Wolves	NOHA	36	27	34	61	31	7	3	5	8	0
1952–53	Sudbury Wolves	Al-Cup	—	—	—	—	—	7	4	6	10	6
1953–54	Cincinnati Mohawks	IHL	47	24	29	53	96	11	3	3	6	20
1954–55	Cincinnati Mohawks	IHL	57	27	37	74	80	10	1	8	9	25
1955–56	Cincinnati Mohawks	IHL	58	34	32	66	62	8	2	7	9	0
1956–57	Cincinnati Mohawks	IHL	50	7	10	17	31	—	—	—	—	—
AHL totals			357	71	149	220	314	21	5	9	14	22
NHL totals			8	2	1	3	10	2	0	0	0	0
