= Jailletville, New Brunswick =

Rural community in New Brunswick

Jailletville
- Interactive map of Jailletville
- Coordinates: 46°25′26″N 65°1′35″W
- Country: Canada
- Province: New Brunswick
- County: Kent County
- Lowest elevation: 0 m (0 ft)
- Time zone: UTC-4 (Atlantic (AST))
  - Summer (DST): UTC-3 (ADT)
- Area code: 506

Jailletville is a rural community in Weldford. It is located 5.33 km (3.31 mi) SE of Beersville, on the Jailletville Road between Route 465 and Route 490.

== History ==
Beersville was first called Girvan Settlement for Albert Girvan, Russel Girvan and Samuel Girvan, who were early settlers here. It was renamed Jailletville after the community's first postmaster Charles F. Jaillet with the creation of a post office in 1906. The community of Ford Bank located 2.25 km northwest of Normandie had a post office from 1917 to 1960, but the area is now considered a part of Jailletville as is the area known as Pine Ridge, located 3.83 km east of Fords Mill, on the road to Ford Bank.

== See also ==
- List of communities in New Brunswick
