= Huskisson Parish =

Huskisson
- Parish
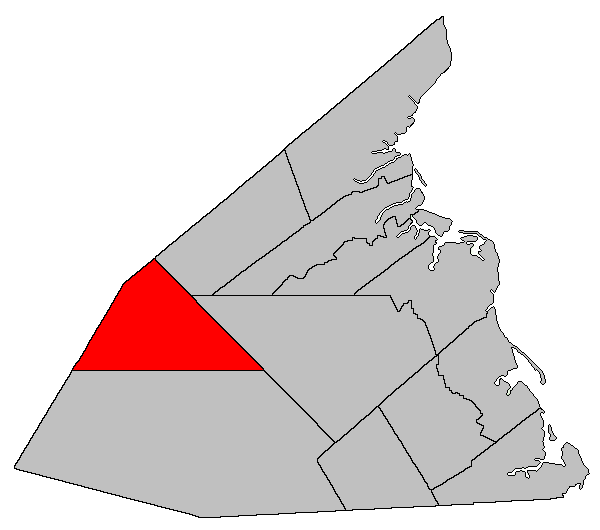
- Location within Kent County, New Brunswick.
- Coordinates: 46.525°N 65.465°W
- Country: Canada
- Province: New Brunswick
- County: Kent County
- Erected: 1827

Area
  - Land: 369.31 km^{2} (142.59 sq mi)

Population (2021)
  - Total: 5
  - Density: 0/km^{2} (0/sq mi)
  - Change 2016-2021: ▼66.7%
  - Dwellings (2021): 8
- Time zone: UTC-4 (AST)
  - Summer (DST): UTC-3 (ADT)

Huskisson is a geographic parish in Kent County, New Brunswick, Canada. (Note: The Territorial Division Act divides the province into 152 parishes, the cities of Saint John and Fredericton, and one town of Grand Falls. The Interpretation Act clarifies that parishes include any local government within their borders.)

For governance purposes the northern part of the parish is within the village of Five Rivers while most belongs to the Kent rural district; both are members of the Kent Regional Service Commission.

Prior to the 2023 governance reform, the parish was part of the local service district of the parish of Harcourt. (Note: Although the provincial regulation named only Harcourt Parish, zoning maps released by the Kent RSC showed that Huskisson Parish was part of the Harcourt Parish LSD, reflecting historic inclusion of Huskisson Parish for statistical purposes.) References to an LSD of Huskisson on provincial governance reforms maps are erroneous.

== Origin of name ==
The parish was named in honour of William Huskisson, President of the Board of Trade at the time of its erection and one of the plenipotentiaries of boundary negotiations with the United States in 1826.

Addington Parish was named at the same time for the other British plenipotentiary, Henry Unwin Addington.

== History ==
In 1827 Huskisson was erected from unassigned territory north of the Richibucto River, comprising a shallower area than it has today.

In 1850 the southern boundary was altered to run due west from its starting point. to include an area annexed by the county in 1845.

== Boundaries ==
Huskisson Parish is bounded:

- on the west and northwest by the Northumberland County line;
- on the east by a line running north 22º west, based on the magnet of 1867, (Note: Magnetic declination at the time was about 21º west.) from a point on the Westmorland County line twenty miles (32 kilometres) west of the northern tip of Shediac Island;
- on the south by a line running due east and west from the mouth of Jimmy Graham Fork on the Richibucto River.

== Communities ==
Communities at least partly within the parish;

- Mortimer

== Bodies of water ==
Bodies of water (Note: Not including brooks, ponds or coves.) at least partly in the parish:

- Kouchibouguacis River
- Richibucto River
- Sabbies River
- Big Forks Stream
- Little Forks Stream
- Hector Fork
- Jimmy Graham Fork
- Johnny Graham Fork
- North Forks
- South Forks
- Big Forks Lake
- Despres Lake
- Lake Francis
- McLain Lake
- Meadow Lake
- Sabbies Lake

== Demographics ==
=== Population ===
Population trend

Census	Population	Change (%)
2021	5	▼66.7%
2016	15	▼40.0%
2011	25	▼49.0%
2006	49	▲390.0%
2001	10	▼44.4%
1996	18	0.0%
1991	18	N/A

=== Language ===
Mother tongue language (2006)

Language	Population	Pct (%)
English only	40	72.73%
French only	15	27.27%
Both English and French	0	0.00%
Other languages	0	0.00%

== See also ==
- List of parishes in New Brunswick
