= Molus River (New Brunswick) =

River in New Brunswick, Canada

Coordinates: 46°34′N 65°5′W

for the community named Molus River, see Molus River

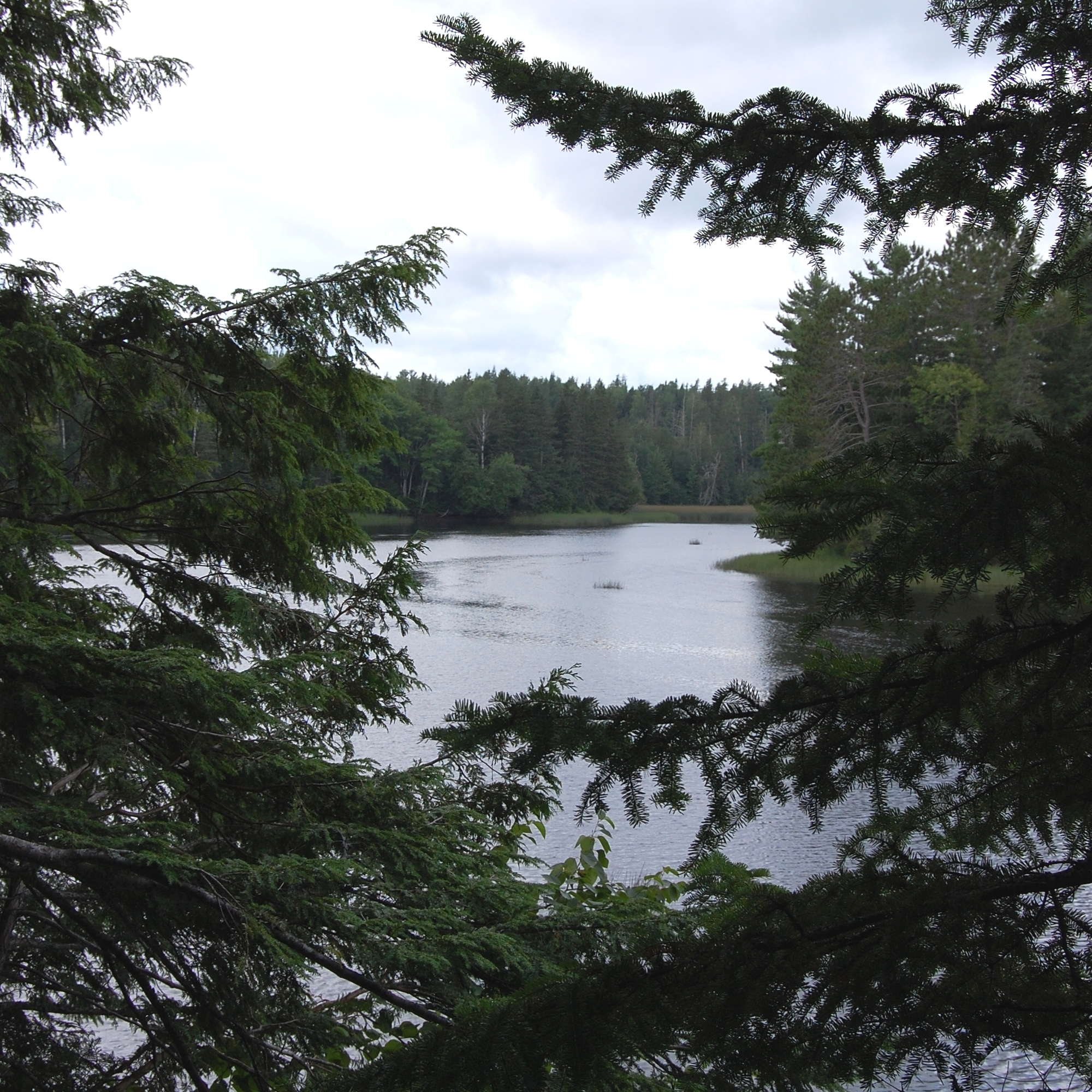
Molus River

Molus River is a fresh water tributary of the Richibucto River, located in Weldford Parish, New Brunswick, Canada. At one time named Moulies River Station, it is located 3.15 km North East of Bass River, New Brunswick on the road to Richibucto. In 1904 Moulies River Station was a stop on the Kent Northern Railway.

The first European settlers of the south side of the Molus River were 1821 Thomas Phelan (Whalen), John Phelan, Patrick Phelan. By the 1830s the north side was also opened and the Warman family settled here. Other settler names: Olsen, Dargavel, Stevenson, Millar, McPherson, Ward, and Harnett. The community reached its height in the late 19th century. By 1900 the community was in decline, the virgin forest of white pine and maple had been stripped from the land to supply the shipbuilding community down river at Kingston now Five Rivers.

Land Grants at Provincial Archives New Brunswick indicate that in 1819 Molus River was "at the center of the Indian Reserve" when it was opened to British subjects for settlement. The community of Molus River, a farming and forestry community, now takes its name from the river. Elsipogtog First Nation is nearby.

== See also ==
- List of rivers of New Brunswick
