= Amanda Polchies =

Indigenous activist from Elsipogtog First Nation

Amanda Polchies is a Lakota Sioux and Mikmaq woman who lives in Elsipogtog First Nation. She became known for an iconic photograph of her, holding aloft an eagle feather while facing down a line of police, as she participated in an anti-fracking blockade near the village of Rexton, New Brunswick, Canada.

== Protest event ==
A rural area near Rexton, New Brunswick, Canada, on the traditional land of the Elsipogtog First Nation, had been marked as a potential site for shale gas development, and exploratory wells were being drilled. The protest turned violent after Royal Canadian Mounted Police (RCMP) moved in to enforce a court injunction against a blockade by Elsipogtog First Nation citizens and their supporters, who said they were not consulted or asked for permission for the development. A line of women formed a physical blockade by linking arms in the highway in front of the police. Polchies received an eagle feather from a young girl during the heat of the protest. She walked into the open space between the other Indigenous women and the line of police, and got down on her knees in front of the RCMP to pray with the feather aloft. She was soon after taken into custody by the police for not complying with their orders to back away from the officers.

At the protest, while Polchies was kneeling and raising the eagle feather in front of the RCMP, she was photographed by Inuk journalist Ossie Michelin The original iPhone image was tweeted by Ossie Michelin on October 17, 2013 at 9:07 am. This photo went viral on Twitter and other social media platforms, and was later part of a national exhibit at the Canadian Museum for Human Rights in Winnipeg. It was deemed best photograph in the museum's Points of View: A National Human Rights Photography Exhibition. This image was adopted by the Idle No More movement, which protested Canada's Bill C-45 that allowed for State encroachment on Indigenous environmental rights.

== Additional renditions and images ==
The viral image led to multiple unique renditions of Michelin's original photo of Polchies. These images have been used in support of the Idle No More Movement, the #NODAPL movement, and other actions for Indigenous rights.

- Nicolas Lampert's Graphic Image Supporting The #NODAPL Movement
- RCMP Taking Polchies Away From The Protest Pt. 1
- RCMP Taking Polchies Away From The Protest Pt. 2
