= Targettville, New Brunswick =

Community in New Brunswick, Canada

Targettville
- Location of Targettville in New Brunswick
- Coordinates: 46.542392°N 65.031166°W
- Country: Canada
- Province: New Brunswick
- County: Kent County
- Lowest elevation: 0 m (0 ft)
- Time zone: UTC-4 (Atlantic (AST))
  - Summer (DST): UTC-3 (ADT)
- Area code: 506

Targettville is a community in the Canadian province of New Brunswick, located in Weldford Parish on the Richibucto River. Today the community has a popular outdoor skating rink and recreation center with an outdoor playground. The facility holds community events such as music nights and family reunions as well as having a very active program for young children during the summer.

== History ==
This community had a Post Office 1928-1956 and was site of the Targettville Quarry, an operation to extract stone along the river and move them to Richibucto to construct the break water for that harbour.

== See also ==
- List of communities in New Brunswick
