= New Brunswick Route 465 =

Highway in New Brunswick, Canada

Coordinates: 46.441406°N 65.073395°W

Route 465

Route information
- Maintained by New Brunswick Department of Transportation

Major junctions
- West end: Route 126 in Coal Branch
- East end: Route 116 in Smiths Corner

Location
- Country: Canada
- Province: New Brunswick

Highway system
- Provincial highways in New Brunswick; Former routes
← Route 460	→ Route 470

Route 465 is an 25-kilometre (16 mi) long north-east secondary highway in the northwest portion of New Brunswick, Canada.

The route's southern terminus starts at the intersection of Route 126 in Coal Branch heading north-east into the community of Clairville. The road follows the Richibucto River north entering the community of Beersville then intersects with Route 470 near Fords Mills. The road then heads north-west crossing the Richibucto River passing the community of Cails Mills then heads west. Following the Richibucto River on the South bank, the road ends at the community of Smiths Corner at the intersection of Route 116.
