= Smiths Corner, New Brunswick =

Coordinates: 46.505393°N 65.16592°W

Smiths Corner is a community in Weldford Parish, in New Brunswick, Canada, located on the Richibucto River, 6.75 kilometres (4.19 mi) southwest of Bass River, on Route 116 and Route 465 to Harcourt.

== History ==
Smiths Corner had a Post Office 1893-1959. In 1898 Smiths Corner was a farming and lumbering settlement with a population of 100.

== See also ==
- List of communities in New Brunswick
