= Acadieville Parish =

Acadieville
- Parish
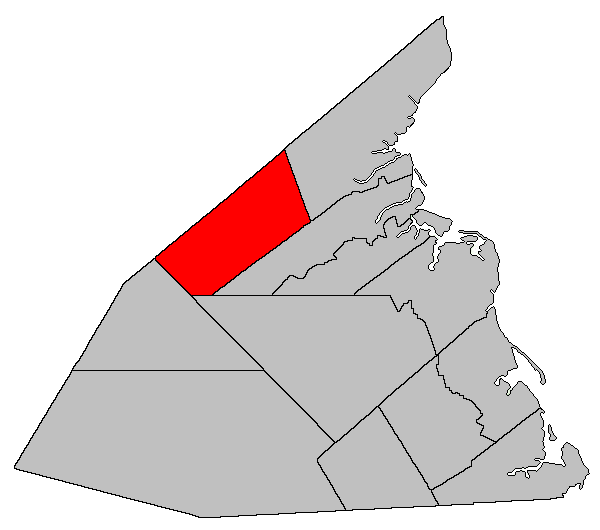
- Location within Kent County, New Brunswick.
- Coordinates: 46.73°N 65.265°W
- Country: Canada
- Province: New Brunswick
- County: Kent County
- Erected: 1876

Area
  - Land: 332.08 km^{2} (128.22 sq mi)

Population (2021)
  - Total: 752
  - Density: 2.3/km^{2} (6.0/sq mi)
  - Change 2016-2021: ▲6.1%
  - Dwellings: 381
- Time zone: UTC-4 (AST)
  - Summer (DST): UTC-3 (ADT)
- Figures do not include the portion within the village of Rogersville

Acadieville is a geographic parish in Kent County, New Brunswick, Canada. (Note: The Territorial Division Act divides the province into 152 parishes, the cities of Saint John and Fredericton, and one town of Grand Falls. The Interpretation Act clarifies that parishes include any local government within their borders.)

For governance purposes it is almost entirely within the village of Nouvelle-Arcadie, with a small area on the eastern boundary part of the Kent rural district, (Note: Map of Nouvelle-Arcadie still visible as a thumbnail shows the current and previous governance boundaries.) both of which are members of the Kent Regional Service Commission.

Prior to the 2023 governance reform, the parish was divided between the village of Rogersville and the local service district of the parish of Acadieville, which included an area with reduced services named Acadie Siding.

== Origin of name ==
William F. Ganong considered the name's origin to be obviously from Acadie.

== History ==
Acadieville was erected in 1876 from Carleton Parish.

Acadieville Parish was first settled in 1868 by Acadian settlers who rushed to claim the provincial Crown Lands after it was revealed that the surveyed route for the Intercolonial Railway would pass through the area.

In 1869, the Intercolonial Railway's route was modified and it was constructed approximately 10 kilometres to the west.

== Boundaries ==
Acadieville Parish is bounded:

- on the northwest by the Northumberland County line;
- on the east by the eastern line of a grant in Saint-Luc prolonged southerly to the Saint-Louis Parish line and northerly to the Northumberland County line;
- on the southeast by a line running south 75º 30' west (Note: By the magnet of 1857, when declination in the area was between 21º and 22º west of north.) from the corner of a grant west of Route 11 near Saint-Théodule in Saint-Louis Parish to the northern line of Weldford Parish, at a point about 3.25 kilometres west of Route 126;
- on the south by the northern line of Weldford Parish, which is a line due west from the northernmost corner of the Richibucto 15 Indian reserve;
- on the west by a line running north 22º west, based on the magnet of 1867, (Note: When declination in the area was about 21º west of north.) from a point on the Westmorland County line twenty miles (32 kilometres) west of the northern tip of Shediac Island.

== Communities ==
Communities at least partly within the parish; bold indicates a municipality

- Acadie Siding
- Acadieville
- Barrieau
- Block 14
- Centre-Acadie
- Noinville
- Pineau
- Richard-Village
- **Rogersville**
- Saint-Athanase
- Saint-Luc
- Vautour
- Village-Saint-Jean
- Village-Saint-Pierre

== Bodies of water ==
Bodies of water (Note: Not including brooks, ponds or coves.) at least partly in the parish:

- Barnaby River
- Bay du Vin River
- Kouchibouguac River

== Demographics ==
Population totals do not include the village of Rogersville. Revised census figures based on the 2023 local governance reforms have not been released.

=== Population ===
**Population trend**

Census	Population	Change (%)
2016	709	▼4.7%
2011	744	▼9.9%
2006	826	▼12.5%
2001	944	▼6.9%
1996	1,014	▼1.5%
1991	1,029	N/A

=== Language ===
**Mother tongue (2016)**

Language	Population	Pct (%)
French only	615	87.23%
English only	75	10.64%
Both English and French	10	1.42%
Other languages	5	0.71%

== See also ==
- List of parishes in New Brunswick
