= Aldouane, New Brunswick =

Aldouane
- Location of Aldouane in New Brunswick
- Coordinates: 46.617°N 65.050°W
- Country: Canada
- Province: New Brunswick
- County: Kent County
- Established: 1790
- Lowest elevation: 0 m (0 ft)
- Time zone: UTC-4 (Atlantic (AST))
  - Summer (DST): UTC-3 (ADT)
- Area code: 506
- NTS Map: 21I10 Richibucto

Aldouane (/ˈældweɪn/ ALD-wayn) is an unincorporated community in the Canadian province of New Brunswick; a former local service district to the east took its name from the Aldouane River, a former name of the Rivière Saint-Charles, and Aldouane Lake, a former name of Northwest Branch.

== History ==
Aldouane was settled in 1790, being a village of around fifteen families.

== Demographics ==
In the 2021 Census of Population conducted by Statistics Canada, Aldouane had a population of 947 living in 436 of its 501 total private dwellings, a change of 5.8% from its 2016 population of 895. With a land area of 9.95 km^{2} (3.84 sq mi), it had a population density of 95.2/km^{2} (246.5/sq mi) in 2021.

== See also ==
- List of communities in New Brunswick
- List of people from Kent County, New Brunswick
