= Mildred Milliea =

Canadian teacher and linguist

- Born: 1930; Big Cove, New Brunswick, Elsipogtog First Nation
- Died: April 4, 2019 (aged 88–89); Rexton Lions Nursing home
- Spouse: William John Milliea
- Parent(s): Mary Francis, Martin Francis
- Relatives: Anthony Francis (Brother) Jane Levi (Sister)

Mildred Milliea (1930–2019) was a Canadian First Nations teacher and linguist, belonging to the Elsipogtog First Nation people. Milliea was born in Big Cove, New Brunswick, in the Elsipogtog First Nation. Milliea was the mother to 12 children. In 1946, she became one of the first students from the Elsipogtog First Nation to complete her formal schooling, despite the lack of availability of educational facilities at the time. She went on to complete three courses in adult education at the New Brunswick Community College, and became an instructor in the Mi'kmaq language to students in Big Cove Elementary School. Milliea went on to provide instruction in the Mi'kmaq language to communities outside Big Cove, and in 1975, was awarded 'Native Woman of the Year' in Canada. Milliea developed one of the first curricula for teaching the Mi'kmaq language in the Maritimes, and wrote several books about Mi'kmaq grammar and linguistics, including a compilation of common songs, rhymes, and hymns and other reference texts. She also designed the orthography for Mi'kmaq which is used in New Brunswick, and designed a modified Pacifique script for the language. She went on to complete courses in language instruction from Lakehead University, and was awarded an honorary doctorate from St. Thomas University. Milliea also acted as a Mi'kmaq translator for the script of the film, A Village Through Time, which documents the history of the Mi'kmaq people.

In 1996, Milliea was appointed a Member of the Order of Canada for her contributions to language and education, and was described as a "...role model for her people and an active community worker." In 2002, she was a recipient of Queen Elizabeth II's Golden Jubilee Medal. In 2012, she was a recipient of Queen Elizabeth II's Diamond Jubilee Medal. She died in 2019.

== Publications ==
- Milliea, Mildred. 1989. "Micmac Catholicism in my Community". In William Cowan, ed. Actes du Vingtieme Congres des Algonquinistes, 262–66. Ottawa: Carleton University.
- Milliea, Mildred. 1979. "Meanings of Micmac Words". in William Cowan ed. Papers of the Tenth Algonquian Conference. 16–27. Ottawa: Carleton University.
- Milliea, Mildred, and Levi, Peter. 1978. "An Overview of Recent Micmac Language Research and Development." Papers of the Ninth Algonquian Conference. 211. Ottawa: Carleton University.
- Milliea, Mildred. 2005. Helping Grandma. Scholastic Canada. ISBN 9-780-77915-5033
