= Bass River Point, New Brunswick =

Coordinates: 46.558949°N 65.041723°W

Bass River Point is a community in Weldford Parish, New Brunswick located 4.25 km east-south-east of Molus River. Today the area is home to the largest farming operations remaining in the community and one of the largest in New Brunswick, Shipyard Farms. Bass River Point is a popular spot for trout fishing and enjoying country living.

== History ==
Bass River Point had a Post Office from 1915 to 1956.

== See also ==
- List of communities in New Brunswick
