= East Branch, New Brunswick =

Coordinates: 46.530672°N 64.854956°W

East Branch is a community in Weldford Parish, New Brunswick. It was named for the east branch of the St. Nicholas River and is located 2.55 km east of South Branch. In 1898 it was a farming and lumbering settlement with one sawmill and a population of 75.

== See also ==
- List of communities in New Brunswick
