= Clairville, New Brunswick =

Community in New Brunswick, Canada

Coordinates: 46.38282°N 65.100689°W

Clairville is a community in Weldford Parish, New Brunswick, located 5.34 km NE of Coal Branch, on the road to Jailletville on Route 465. It was formerly named Hawk Ridge and New Lorne Settlement, and was later renamed to Clairville after an early settler.

== See also ==
- List of communities in New Brunswick
