= Christian Kit Goguen =

Canadian musician (born 1978)

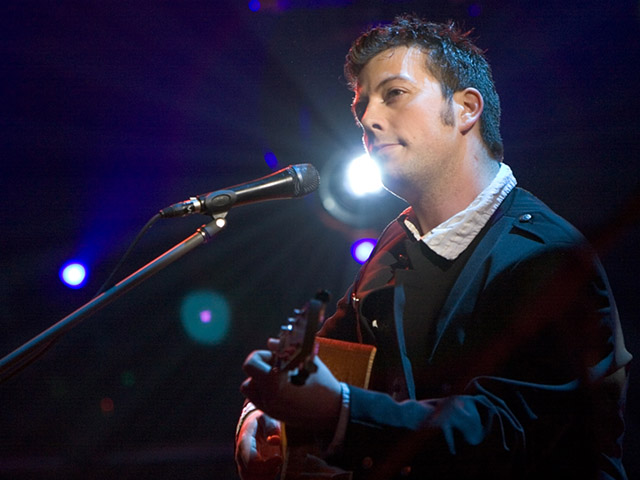
Christian Kit Goguen

Christian Kit Goguen (born September 9, 1978) is an Acadian singer-songwriter/actor from Saint-Charles, New Brunswick. His work is mostly in French, but he also writes and sings in English.

Winner of the 2003 Gala de la chanson de Caraquet for singer-songwriter and best song, the first time that the competition awarded the two top prizes to one artist. He has since performed as a solo artist and as part of the musical revue "Ode à l'Acadie". He was also awarded the Prix Rideau-Acadie in 2006 and the winner of the competition "Le choix du future" organised by Moncton's CHOY-FM.

Christian has performed his own songs and versions of other well-known Acadian artists. He has performed in the United States, in Canada, Switzerland, Belgium, France, Spain, Burkina Faso. He regularly presents a Mi'kmaq version of "The Gathering Song" during his shows. His version of this song is part of his trademark, and shows the collaboration and friendship that has developed between the Mi'kmaq and the Acadians. He released his first self-titled album in 2005.

He studied drama at the Université de Moncton, did some acting with the Théâtre l'Escaouette in Moncton and on the television show Samuel, broadcast on Radio-Canada, the French CBC.

He has been a special guest at the East Coast Music Award Show, and has also been invited by Benoît Pelletier, to perform for the Premier of Quebec Jean Charest at the Salon Rouge in the National Assembly in Quebec City.

He is a singer on the Cirque du Soleil production Corteo.
