= Balla Philip, New Brunswick =

Coordinates: 46.48947°N 64.912634°W

Location of Balla Philip in New Brunswick

Balla Philip is a small community in Weldford Parish, New Brunswick, located 5.56 kilometres (3.45 mi) South of South Branch. The community is located on Route 495.

== History ==
Balla Philip had a Post Office from 1910 to 1958. The community was named for Ballyphilip in County Tipperary, Ireland and historically, there were Irish immigrants in the community.

== See also ==
- List of communities in New Brunswick
