= Grangeville, New Brunswick =

Unincorporated community in Kent County, New Brunswick, Canada

Coordinates: 46.424132°N 65.205917°W

Grangeville is a Canadian unincorporated community, located in Kent County, New Brunswick. The community is situated in southeastern New Brunswick, to the northwest of Moncton. Grangeville is located mainly on the New Brunswick Route 126.

== See also ==
- List of communities in New Brunswick

== Bordering communities ==
- Kent Junction
- Adamsville, New Brunswick
- Emerson, New Brunswick
- Harcourt, New Brunswick
