= Saint-Joseph, New Brunswick =

Coordinates: 46.603636°N 65.244627°W

Saint-Joseph is a community in Weldford, located 6.63 km ENE of Kent Junction.

== History ==
Saint-Joseph had a Post Office and was called Village-Saint-Joseph from 1923-1927. The community is generally considered a part of the Kent Junction area and is home to Acadian families.

== See also ==
- List of communities in New Brunswick
