= Mortimer, New Brunswick =

Unincorporated community in New Brunswick, Canada

Coordinates: 46°29′14″N 65°15′39″W

Mortimer is a Canadian unincorporated community, located in Kent County, New Brunswick. The community is situated in southeastern New Brunswick, Between Moncton and Nouvelle-Arcadie. Mortimer is located mainly at the intersection of Route 126 and Route 116, also known as the Salmon River Road and the Beckwith Road.

== See also ==
- List of communities in New Brunswick

== Bordering communities ==
- Harcourt, New Brunswick
- Kent Junction, New Brunswick
- Castaway, New Brunswick
- Smiths Corner, New Brunswick
