= Harcourt, New Brunswick =

Harcourt Weldford
- Village
- Location of Harcourt in New Brunswick
- Coordinates: 46.469917°N 65.245744°W
- Country: Canada
- Province: New Brunswick
- County: Kent County
- Parish: Harcourt Parish
- Settlement Established: 1869
- Name changed to Harcourt: 1894
- Elevation: 60.00 m (196.85 ft)

Population (2011)
  - Total: 390
- Time zone: UTC-4 (AST)
  - Summer (DST): UTC-3 (ADT)
- Canadian Postal code: E4T
- Area code: 506

Harcourt is a Canadian unincorporated community, located in Kent County, New Brunswick. The community is situated in southeastern New Brunswick, Between Moncton and Nouvelle-Arcadie. Population, according to Statistics Canada Census 2011, is 390. Average age of population is 50. Harcourt is located around the intersection of Route 116 and Route 126.

== Education ==
Most students go to Harcourt School.

== History ==
A settlement called Weldford was first established on this site in 1869 when the railway was constructed. By 1871 the population was 150. In 1894 the settlement was renamed Harcourt and by 1898 the population had grown to 250 and had become the site of a station on the Intercolonial Railway. Harcourt was a farming and lumbering settlement with 7 stores, 2 hotels, 1 tannery, 1 sawmill, 1 hemlock bark extract factory, 1 carriage factory, 3 churches.

The plane carrying T. Babbitt Parlee crashed near here in 1957.

== Bordering communities ==
- Bryants Corner, New Brunswick
- Grangeville, New Brunswick
- Mortimer, New Brunswick

== See also ==
- List of communities in New Brunswick
