= Molus River, New Brunswick =

Settlement in New Brunswick, Canada

Molus River is a settlement in Weldford Parish, New Brunswick on Route 116 on the Molus River.

== History ==
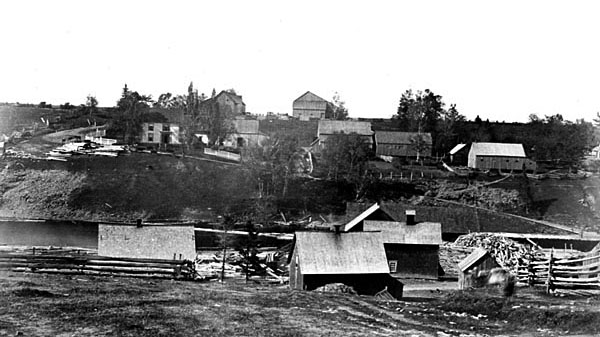
Molus River community in 1887

Epsikitiáskuk is what the Mi’kmaq people of Elsipogtog First Nation called the Molus River.

The settlement had a post office between 1867 and 1970, which was named Moulies River from 1867 to 1950, and then Molus River until 1970. In 1871, the population was 150. In 1898, there was a church, the population had risen to 300, and it was a "farming, fishing and lumbering settlement".

A wharf, with a frontage 95 feet (29 m) long, was constructed in September 1917 by the Department of Public Works. Made of stone-filled cribwork, it was built as a place to land boats and to store shell mud. Shell mud (also called oyster mud or mussel mud) is a "dense mudlike deposit of the remains of generations of bivalves and crustaceans". Because the shells of bivalves—such as oysters and mussels—are almost entirely composed of calcium carbonate, shell muds are a source of agricultural lime.

A possible source for the word Molus is from the French language spoken by Acadian living in the Richibucto River area, with the word "moluёs" being a French word for a tidal flat mussel, a type of shellfish commonly found on muddy beaches along the river.

For a period from about 1850–1900 the name on maps was often spelled Moulies River and moulies is a type of coal shale that was harvested during the days of coal mining operations along the Coal Branch River, which is another tributary of the Richibucto River Estuary. There is also an old oral tradition that the river may have been named for a Henry Molus, an early settler or explorer in the area.

== See also ==
- List of communities in New Brunswick
