= Saint-Norbert, New Brunswick =

Community in New Brunswick, Canada

Coordinates: 46.469°N 64.970°W

Location of Saint-Norbert in New Brunswick

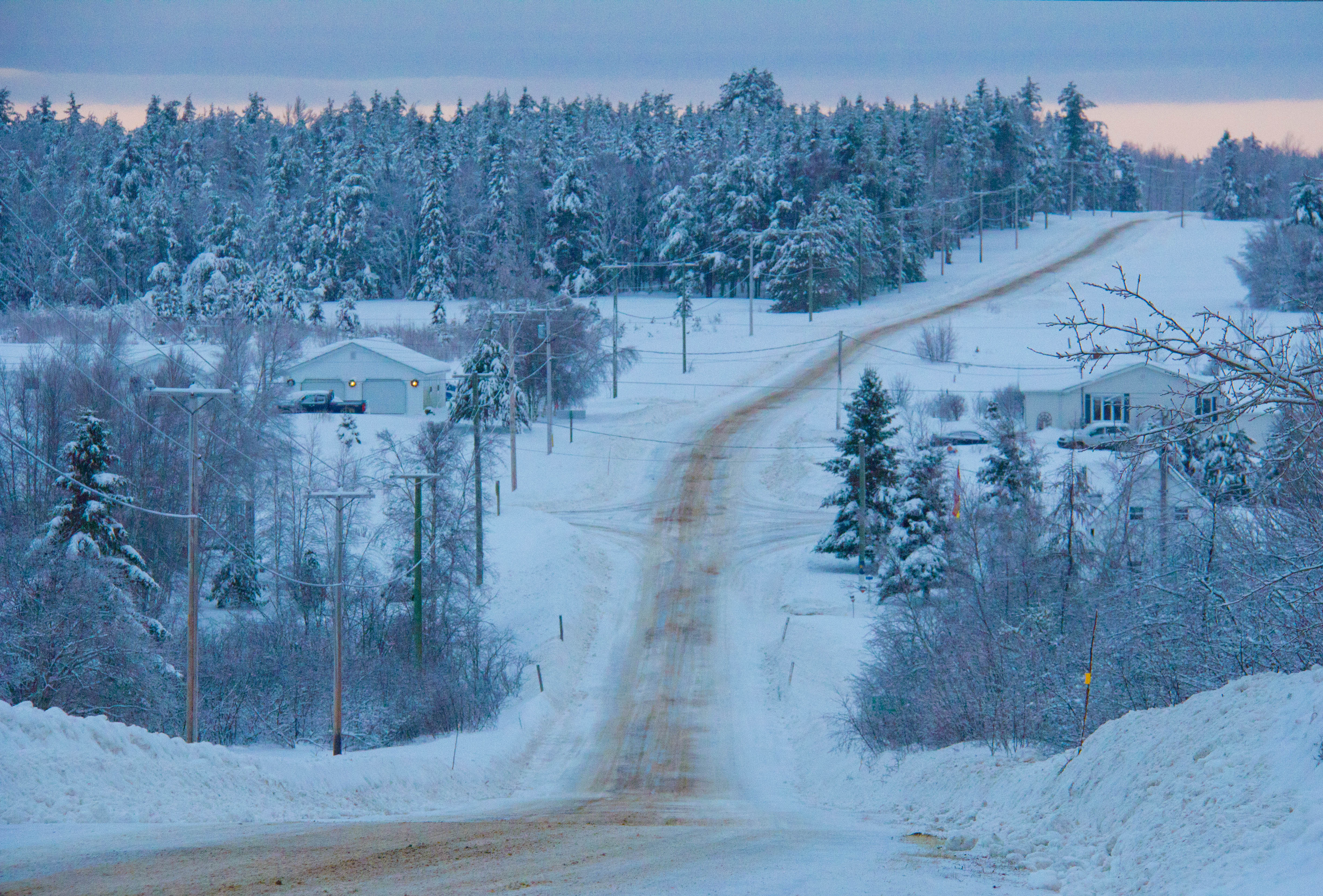
Early December morning in St-Norbert

Saint-Norbert is a settlement in the Canadian province of New Brunswick.

== History ==
Saint-Norbert is a community in Weldford Parish, New Brunswick, located 2.25 km SE of Normandie. There was a Post Office 1881-1970 and it was established about 1850 as Louisbourg: formerly called Boucher Settlement for Eusèbe Boucher, Joseph Boucher and Antoine Boucher, who were early settlers in the area and in 1898 Saint-Norbert was a farming and lumbering settlement with 1 post office, 2 stores, 1 church and a population of 200.

== See also ==
- List of communities in New Brunswick
