= Cails Mills, New Brunswick =

Community in New Brunswick, Canada

Coordinates: 46.486249°N 65.14781°W

Cails Mills is a community in Weldford Parish, New Brunswick, located 4.26 km ENE of Bryants Corner and 3.83 km W of Fords Mills.

== History ==
Cails Mills had a post office from 1912 to 1964.

== See also ==
- List of communities in New Brunswick
