= Bonar Law Memorial High School =

Location
- 197 Main Street; Five Rivers, New Brunswick, E4W 2A9; Canada
- Coordinates: 46.64151°N 64.85854°W

Information
- School type: Public, high school
- Status: Open
- School district: Anglophone North (ASD-N)
- Superintendent: Mark Donovan
- Principal: Carol Davis
- Grades: 9–12
- Language: English; French immersion
- Area: Five Rivers, New Brunswick
- Colours: Orange; Black
- Mascot: Bengal Tiger
- Team name: Bonar Law Bengals
- Website: bonarlaw.nbed.nb.ca
- ^{‡} All statistics in this infobox (unless otherwise cited) is referenced with

Bonar Law Memorial School (BLMS) is a high school located in Five Rivers, New Brunswick, in the Anglophone North school district. In 2014, the school's student population was approximately 400. Approximately 52% of the students are First Nations. The school is fed by Eleanor W. Graham Middle School and Elsipogtog School. BLMS has a teaching staff of 34 teachers and twenty educational assistants.

== History ==
The school in named in honour of British Prime Minister Bonar Law, who was born in Five Rivers (then known as Kingston).

== See also ==
- Anglophone North School District
- List of schools in New Brunswick
