= Browns Yard, New Brunswick =

Coordinates: 46.520898°N 65.072837°W

Browns Yard is a community in Weldford Parish, New Brunswick located 4.5 km NE of Fords Mills close to the intersection of Route 490 and Route 510.

The church is St. Paul's Anglican and features an old cemetery where some of the earliest settlers of Weldford Parish were buried. The church continues to be the center of family life with activities for children, youth and many family events hosted at their church hall.

== History ==
Browns Yard was once called Upper Main River, and had a post office from 1909 to 1956. There is a church near the shore and this was the site of shipbuilding operations with 7 ships claimed to have been constructed at Browns Yard.

== See also ==
- List of communities in New Brunswick
