= Birch Ridge, New Brunswick =

Community in Kent County, New Brunswick, Canada

Coordinates: 46.3195°N 65.1157°W

Birch Ridge is a Canadian community located in Kent County, New Brunswick. The community is situated in southeastern New Brunswick, to the northwest of Moncton.

== See also ==
- List of communities in New Brunswick

== Bordering communities ==
- Hebert, New Brunswick
- Coal Branch, New Brunswick
