= Fords Mills, New Brunswick =

Coordinates: 46.487815°N 65.090089°W

Location of Fords Mills in New Brunswick

Fords Mills is a settlement in Weldford Parish, New Brunswick, at the intersection of Route 470 and Route 510 on the Richibucto River.

== History ==
Fords Mills is named for John Prall Ford, born August 1, 1789, at Hammond River. Ford died suddenly on August 2, 1869, at Hammond River, New Brunswick at age 80 years, and is interred at St. Paul's Church of England, Hampton, New Brunswick. He married Phoebe Townsend, who died March 24, 1887, age 95.

Ford's father, Captain John Ford, (b. 1746 - d. 1823) was a loyalist officer with the New Jersey Volunteers during the American Revolution. He ma married Alcha Prall (d. 1746 - d. 1836) of New Jersey Dutch ancestry. J. P. Ford, formerly of Halifax, built The Fords Mill on the Richibucto River about 1825.

Daniel F. Johnson's New Brunswick Newspaper Transcripts at Provincial Archives New Brunswick - "August 4, 1869 County: Saint John Place: Saint John Newspaper: Morning News John P. FORD, Esq., nearly 80 years old, resident of Kings Co. suddenly dropped dead just outside his house at Hammond River, Monday morn., directly after taking his breakfast."

There was a Post Office in Coal Branch from 1868 to 1883 and in 1871 Coal Branch had a population of 200. The community was renamed Fords Mills in 1883 and had a Post Office from 1883 to 1966. In 1904 Ford's Mills was a lumbering settlement with 2 stores, 1 sawmill, 1 grist mill and a population of 150.

Ford's Mills in 2010 was home of The Greenwood Lodge which hosts community suppers and musical entertainment including Maritime musicians, such as Matt Minglewood. The local ambulance and fire protection services are located in this community. Fords Mill is located 3.83 km E of Cails Mills and was first called Coal Branch.

== See also ==
- List of communities in New Brunswick
