= West Branch, New Brunswick =

West Branch
- Location of West Branch in New Brunswick
- Coordinates: 46.544222°N 64.950399°W
- Country: Canada
- Province: New Brunswick
- County: Kent County
- Lowest elevation: 0 m (0 ft)
- Time zone: UTC-4 (Atlantic (AST))
  - Summer (DST): UTC-3 (ADT)
- Area code: 506

West Branch is a community in Weldford Parish located on the West Branch River, 6.12 km SSW of Mundleville, on the road to Ford Bank on Route 470.

== See also ==
- List of communities in New Brunswick
