= Kent Junction, New Brunswick =

Human settlement in New Brunswick, Canada

Coordinates: 46°35′24″N 65°20′13″W

Kent Junction is a Canadian unincorporated community, located in Kent County, New Brunswick. The community is situated in southeastern New Brunswick, between Moncton and Nouvelle-Arcadie. Kent Junction is located mainly on New Brunswick Route 126.

== History ==
Kent Junction had a Post Office from 1884 to 1891 and again 1894–1970. In 1898 Kent Junction was a station on the Intercolonial Railway and a farming and lumbering settlement with 1 post office, 1 store, 1 hotel and a population of 75.

== Places of note ==
- Kent Lake Lodge (Community Center)

== See also ==
- List of communities in New Brunswick

== Bordering communities ==
- Noinville, New Brunswick
- Mortimer, New Brunswick
