= New Brunswick Route 490 =

Highway in New Brunswick, Canada

Route 490

Route information
- Maintained by New Brunswick Department of Transportation
- Length: 57.6 km (35.8 mi)

Major junctions
- North end: Route 116 in Bass River
- South end: Route 115 in Moncton

Location
- Country: Canada
- Province: New Brunswick
- Major cities: Bass River, Moncton

Highway system
- Provincial highways in New Brunswick; Former routes
← Route 485	→ Route 495

Route 490 is a north–south provincial highway in the Canadian province of New Brunswick. The road runs from Route 116 intersection in Bass River. The road has a length of approximately 57.6 kilometres, and services small, otherwise isolated rural communities. In these areas, the highway is often unofficially referred to as "Main Street". When the highway enters Moncton, it is known as McLaughlin Drive.

== Intersecting routes ==
- New Brunswick Route 116 in Bass River
- New Brunswick Route 510 in Browns Yard
- New Brunswick Route 470 in Pine Ridge
- New Brunswick Route 515 in McLean Settlement
- New Brunswick Route 485 in Sweeneyville
- New Brunswick Route 515 in Hebert
- New Brunswick Route 2 in Moncton
- New Brunswick Route 115 in Moncton

== River crossings ==
- Richibucto River - Browns Yard
- Richibucto River - Pine Ridge (2 crossings)
- Bouctouche River - McLean Settlement
- Bouctouche River - Gladside

== Communities along Route ==
- Bass River
- Browns Yard
- Pine Ridge
- McLean Settlement
- Gladeside
- Dundas
- McQuade
- Ammon
- Moncton

== See also ==
- List of New Brunswick provincial highways
