= Bryants Corner, New Brunswick =

Coordinates: 46.472271°N 65.199394°W

Bryants Corner is a community in Weldford Parish, New Brunswick, Canada. Located 3.83 km E of Harcourt, it is named for James Bryant, Jabez Bryant, William Bryant Jr. and Annie Bryant who were early settlers bringing the Open Plymouth Brethren religion to the community with the formation of the Emerson Road Gospel Hall with attached cemetery. The community is located on Route 116.

== History ==
There was a Post Office from 1912 to 1964 and it included Colebrookdale, a former name for the community of Coal Branch.

== See also ==
- List of communities in New Brunswick
