= Weldford Parish, New Brunswick =

Weldford
- Parish
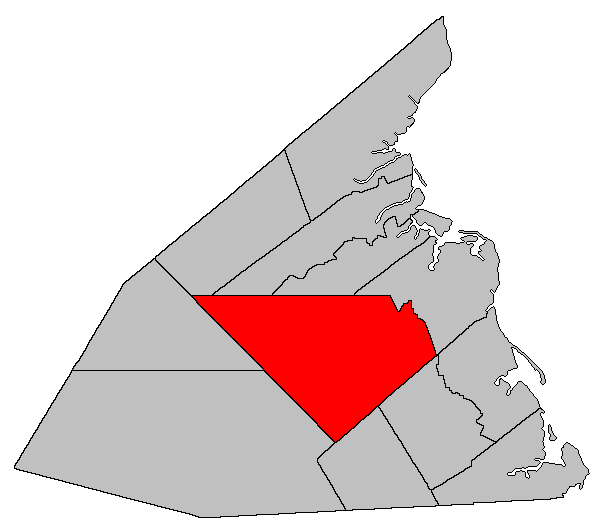
- Location within Kent County, New Brunswick.
- Coordinates: 46.47°N 65.0925°W
- Country: Canada
- Province: New Brunswick
- County: Kent County
- Erected: 1835

Area
  - Land: 607.56 km^{2} (234.58 sq mi)

Population (2021)
  - Total: 1,335
  - Density: 2.2/km^{2} (5.7/sq mi)
  - Change 2016-2021: ▲0.2%
  - Dwellings: 720
- Time zone: UTC-4 (AST)
  - Summer (DST): UTC-3 (ADT)
- Figures do not include portion within the Richibucto 15 Indian reserve Population change reflects revision of 2016 figure

Weldford is a geographic parish in Kent County, New Brunswick, Canada. (Note: The Territorial Division Act divides the province into 152 parishes, the cities of Saint John and Fredericton, and one town of Grand Falls. The Interpretation Act clarifies that parishes include any local government within their borders.)

For governance purposes it is divided between the villages of Five Rivers and Nouvelle-Arcadie, which are both members of the Kent Regional Service Commission, and the Richibucto 15 Indian reserve, which is not.

Prior to the 2023 governance reform, all of the parish outside the Indian reserve formed the local service district of the parish of Weldford.

== Origin of name ==
Weldford was a portmanteau of the names of the two Kent County Members of the Legislative Assembly in 1835, John W. Weldon and John P. Ford.

== History ==
Weldford was erected in 1835 from Richibucto Parish.

== Boundaries ==
Weldford Parish is bounded:

- on the north by a line due west from the northernmost corner of the Richibucto 15 Indian reserve;
- on the east by a line running southerly along the eastern border of the main part of the Richibucto 15 Indian reserve to the Richibucto River, downstream to the mouth of the St. Nicholas River, up the St. Nicholas and then the East Branch St. Nicholas River to the mouth of Black Brook, then southerly to the Wellington Parish line at a point west of the East Branch Road;
- on the south by the prolongation of a line running south 68º west (Note: By the magnet of 1850, when declination in the area was between 21º and 22º west of north.) from the mouth of the Rivière Chockpish-nord;
- on the west by a line running north 22º west, based on the magnet of 1867, (Note: Declination at the time was about 21º west.) from a point on the Westmorland County line twenty miles (32 kilometres) west of the northern tip of Shediac Island.

== Communities ==
Communities at least partly within the parish; bold indicates an Indian reserve; italics indicate a name no longer in official use

- Balla Philip
- Bass River
- Bass River Point
- Beersville
- Brest
- Browns Yard
- Bryants Corner
- Cails Mills
- Clairville
- East Branch
- Emerson
- Ford Bank
- Fords Mills
- Jailletville
- Kent Junction
- Lower Main River
- Molus River
- Mundleville
- Normandie
- Pine Ridge
- **Richibucto 15** (Big Cove)
- Saint-Joseph
- Saint-Norbert
- Smiths Corner
- South Branch
- Targettville
- Village-Saint Augustin
- West Branch

== Bodies of water ==
Bodies of water (Note: Not including brooks, ponds or coves.) at least partly in the parish:

- Bass River
- Coal Branch River
- Kouchibouguacis River
- Molus River
- Richibucto River
- St. Nicholas River
- Bells Creek
- Big Cove Creek
- Clares Creek
- Gaspereau Creek
- George Beers Creek
- McKays Creek
- Big North Fork
- Little North Fork
- Lac Saint-Joseph

== Islands ==
Islands at least partly in the parish:

- Jerrys Island

== Other notable places ==
Parks, historic sites, and other noteworthy places at least partly in the parish.

- Blind Brook Protected Natural Area
- Richibucto River Protected Natural Area

== Demographics ==
Parish population does not include Richibucto 15 Indian reserve

=== Population ===
**Population trend**

Census	Population	Change (%)
2016	1,338	▲1.5%
2011	1,318	▼7.6%
2006	1,426	▼2.8%
2001	1,467	▼6.0%
1996	1,561	▲0.1%
1991	1,560	N/A

=== Language ===
**Mother tongue (2016)**

Language	Population	Pct (%)
English only	1,105	82.5%
French only	190	14.2%
Other languages	35	2.6%
Both English and French	10	0.7%

=== Religion ===
There are several Catholic churches in Weldford Parish, all belonging to the Roman Catholic Archdiocese of Moncton:

- St. Bartholomew mission in Bass River,
- Saint-Norbert in Saint-Norbert, and
- St. Peter in South Branch.

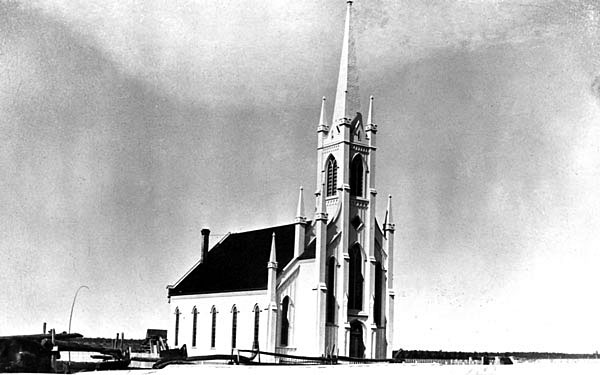
Bass River Presbyterian Church in 1886

Also there are four Presbyterian churches, belonging to Bass River Pastoral Charge, The Presbytery of New Brunswick, Synod of the Atlantic Provinces:

- St. Marks Presbyterian Church in Bass River,
- St. James Presbyterian Church in Beersville,
- St. Andrew's Presbyterian Church in Clairville, and
- Zion Presbyterian Church in West Branch.

The United Church of Canada has two congregations, belonging to Rexton Pastoral Charge, Chignecto Presbytery, Maritime Conference:

- St. Stephen's United Church in Molus River, and
- St. John's United Church in West Branch.

And there is one Anglican church, belonging to the Parish of Kent, Archdeaconry of Moncton, Diocese of Fredericton.

- St. Paul's Church in Browns Yard.

== See also ==
- List of parishes in New Brunswick
