= Adamsville, New Brunswick =

Adamsville
- Location of Adamsville in New Brunswick
- Coordinates: 46.396667°N 65.184167°W
- Country: Canada
- Province: New Brunswick
- County: Kent County
- Lowest elevation: 0 m (0 ft)
- Time zone: UTC-4 (Atlantic (AST))
  - Summer (DST): UTC-3 (ADT)
- Area code: 506
- NTS Map: 21I10 Richibucto

Adamsville is a Canadian unincorporated community, located in Kent County, New Brunswick. The community is situated in southeastern New Brunswick, to the northwest of Moncton. Adamsville is located mainly on the New Brunswick Route 126.

== Places of note ==
- Adamsville Lake has been an important trading spot to its original aboriginal Miq-Maq (Mic-Mac) people.

== See also ==
- List of communities in New Brunswick

== Bordering communities ==
- Coal Branch, New Brunswick
- Grangeville, New Brunswick
- Saint-Augustin, New Brunswick
- Saint-Sosime, New Brunswick
