= Coal Branch, New Brunswick =

Canadian unincorporated community

Coordinates: 46.356°N 65.150°W

Coal Branch is a Canadian unincorporated community, located in Kent County, New Brunswick. The community is situated in southeastern New Brunswick, to the northwest of Moncton. Coal Branch is located mainly at the intersection of New Brunswick Route 126 and New Brunswick Route 465 on the Coal Branch River. Coal Branch is a tributary of the Richibucto River.

== History ==
In 1898 it was a farming and lumbering community with a population of 500. In 1898 Coal Branch was a station on the Intercolonial Railway and a farming and lumbering settlement with a population of 100. A post office existed there until 1970. The Coal Branch River was once the site of coal mining operations with the Beersville Coal and Railway Company.

== Places of note ==
- The community also has a community center, softball field and local churches.

== Bordering communities ==
- Clairville, New Brunswick
- Birch Ridge, New Brunswick
- Adamsville, New Brunswick

== Notable people ==
- Adamsville, New Brunswick

== See also ==
- List of communities in New Brunswick
