= Normandie, New Brunswick =

Coordinates: 46.481817°N 64.984946°W

Normandie is a community in Weldford Parish, located 2.25 km NW of Saint-Norbert, on the road to Ford Bank.

== History ==
Normandie had a Post Office 1914-1958 and is generally considered part of Saint-Norbert. Normandie was named for the French province of Normandie.

== See also ==
- List of communities in New Brunswick
