= Saint-Charles, New Brunswick =

Settlement in New Brunswick, Canada

Coordinates: 46.667°N 65.976°W

Location of Saint-Charles in New Brunswick

Saint-Charles is a settlement in Kent County, New Brunswick, Canada. It is home of many famous people such as Christian Kit Goguen and the band Réveil. There are some landmarks that are well known in the province like the community center, Église de Saint-Charles (church), and the castle from "Chateau Spring Water".

== See also ==
- List of communities in New Brunswick
