= South Branch, New Brunswick =

Coordinates: 46.536842°N 64.904995°W

South Branch is a community in Weldford Parish located on the South Branch River on Route 495, 2.55 km E of West Branch

== History ==
South Branch had a post office from 1873 to 1960. In 1898, South Branch had a population of 400.

== See also ==
- List of communities in New Brunswick
