= Elsipogtog First Nation =

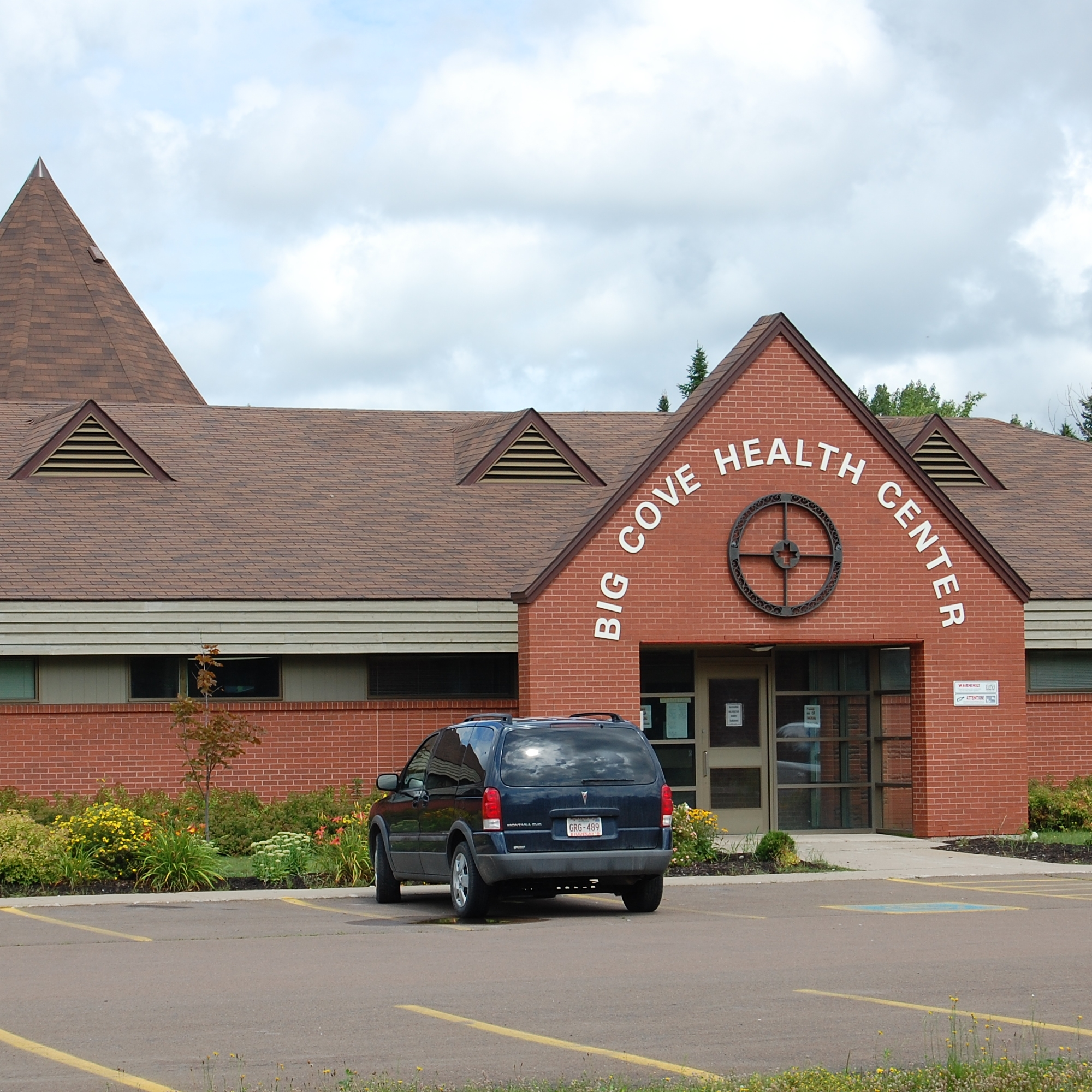
- Elsipogtog Health Center

- Flag

- Location of Elsipogtog First Nation in New Brunswick
- Coordinates: 46°35′48″N 64°58′50″W
- Country: Canada
- Province: New Brunswick
- County: Kent County
- Established: 1805

Government
  - Chief: Arren Sock
  - MP: Jake Stewart (C)
  - MLA: Kevin Arseneau (Green)

Area
  - Total: 17.72 km^{2} (6.84 sq mi)
- Lowest elevation: 0 m (0 ft)
- Time zone: UTC-4 (Atlantic (AST))
  - Summer (DST): UTC-3 (ADT)
- Area code: 506 / 428
- NTS Map: 21I10 Richibucto

Elsipogtog First Nation (/ˈɛlsiˌbʊk.tʊk/ EL-see-book-took; Mi'kmaq: Elsipugtug), formerly called the Big Cove Band, is a Miꞌkmaq First Nations band government in New Brunswick, Canada. The First Nation's territory comprises Richibucto Reserve #15, lying 8 kilometres (5.0 mi) southwest of Five Rivers, New Brunswick on the Richibucto River off of Route 116. It also comprises Soegao Reserve #35, lying 5 kilometres (3.1 mi) west of Moncton, New Brunswick. As of April 2023, the registered Elsipogtog population is 3,574, with 2,736 living on reservations and 798 living off reservations.

== History ==
"Elsipogtog" or "L'sipuktuk" means "River of Fire". The area was also called the stronghold of Sikniktuk. The traditional district was assigned to the Mi'kmaq clan of Alguimou, or L'kimu. Misel Alguimou was baptised Michael Augustine in the 18th century. Chief Michael Augustine signed the Peace and Friendship Treaty with the British in 1761, on behalf of the Richibucto Tribe of Mi'kmaq. The Richibucto Reserve was established in 1802 and later reduced in size. Richibucto Reserve # 16 is also known as the Big Cove Reserve. It was also called Big Cove, Mesigig Oalnei, and currently known as Elsipogtog (Pacifique spelling), or L'sipuktuk (Francis-Smith variation) and Elsipogtog First Nation located in Weldford Parish, New Brunswick.

=== Suicide rate ===
In 1992, there were seven suicides involving youth and over 75 suicide attempts in the community. An inquest was held and one of the recommendations was the creation of a position at the school to help support the youth in the community. The Elsipogtog Crisis Centre was also established in 1992 to help combat the large number of suicides in the community.

=== Youth justice system ===
In 1995, the community held a Justice Awareness Day that led to the creation of a justice alternative for youth. This was due to the high youth suicide rate in Elsipogtog and the large percentage of their youth in the court system. The Elsipogtog Restorative Justice Program includes pre- and post-charge diversion system, mediation, group conferencing programs, and sentencing circles. The program allows the community to "decide what [is] best for itself in terms of resolving wrongdoing...by striving to resolve the effects of an offender's behaviour.

=== Shale gas project ===
In May 2013, members of Elsipogtog First Nation demonstrated their concern over a proposed shale gas project and 2D seismic imaging done near their reserve by SWN Resources Canada, a subsidiary of Southwestern Energy. Workers were on site to conduct seismic exploration using sound wave technology to create images of underground shale beds that might contain natural gas. Many residents used social media to voice their concerns about the planned fracking. Throughout the spring, summer, and fall of 2013, protesters prevented SWN workers from accessing their seismic equipment, blocking Routes 11, 116, and 134. On July 24, a video was recorded of a First Nations protester strapping herself to bundles of geophones and other equipment used by SWN for seismic testing at the site. She slowed down the workers' access to the equipment until the Royal Canadian Mounted Police (RCMP) removed her later that day. On September 29, SWN's trucks were blocked by a mystery van and protesters gathered in support. Shortly afterward, a sacred fire was lit and maintained by a 12-year-old boy who watched over the prayers of the people. On October 1, a video was recorded of Elsipogtog First Nation Chief Arren James Sock delivering an eviction notice to SWN while dozens of protesters continued to block Route 134 in Rexton to prevent the company from moving their exploration equipment.

On October 7, a video was recorded of Sock and New Brunswick premier David Alward addressing the media regarding the blockage of the shale gas research and the injunction regarding the blockade.

On October 17, the RCMP moved in to enforce a court injunction against the road blockade. The situation "exploded in violence, sending dozens of people to jail and reducing five police cars to smouldering ruins". The incident was made famous in a now-iconic photograph of activist Amanda Polchies kneeling before the police and holding an eagle feather. The RCMP said that "more than 40 protesters were arrested for various offences including firearms offences, uttering threats, intimidation, mischief and for refusing to abide by a court injunction". The First Nation's lawyer, T.J. Burke, confirmed that Sock was among those arrested, though he and others were released within hours following their arrests. On October 18, SWN applied for an indefinite injunction against a list of people including John and Jane Doe. Judge Rideout denied this injunction. On November 29, another shale-gas protest resulted in the arrest of five men. Another report on the same day stated that fifteen protesters were jailed for throwing rocks at vehicles. Numerous arrests continued to occur into 2014.

== Present day ==
The community has one school, Elsipogtog School, which has students from kindergarten to grade 8. Elsipogtog has a gas station, and a Royal Canadian Mounted Police detachment which is open throughout the week. There is a 7 day/week supermarket and a Pharmasave-brand pharmacy, both of which are 100-percent band-owned and operated. There's a hotel near the gas station. There is also a holistic-approach health and wellness centre which has clinical and physician services available, as well as home and community care services, mental health, and addiction services. There are community justice services available.

=== Kraft Hockeyville ===
After a fire destroyed the community's arena, the Chief Young Eagle, Elsipogtog entered Kraft Hockeyville, a Canada-wide competition held by Kraft Heinz Canada in collaboration with the National Hockey League (NHL) and the National Hockey League Players' Association (NHLPA). The competition, which started in 2006, gives small communities in Canada a chance to win $250,000 in arena upgrades, $10,000 worth of youth hockey equipment, and the opportunity to host an NHL preseason game. Runners-up receive $25,000 in arena upgrades and $10,000 for youth hockey equipment.

On March 20, 2021, the NHL and NHLPA named four communities as finalists in the competition for 2021: Elsipogtog; Lumsden, Saskatchewan; Saint Adolphe, Manitoba; and Bobcaygeon, Ontario. Following two days of online voting, on April 10, 2021, NHL Commissioner Gary Bettman announced Elsipogtog as the winner of the competition live on Hockey Night in Canada. The win came a week after the tragic loss of two community members in a fishing accident, community leader Craig 'Jumbo' Sock and Seth Monahan.

Due to the COVID-19 pandemic, no NHL preseason was held in 2021, so Elsipogtog's celebrations were delayed until October 2022 after restrictions had been lifted. Three days of activities were held. On the first day, an alumni game was held featuring former NHL players, including Elsipogtog native Everett Sanipass, as well as three female indigenous hockey players who have played for the Canadian and US national teams. Activities on the second day included autograph signings from various players, including New York Islanders legend Bryan Trottier, and a visit from the Stanley Cup. Mascots for the Ottawa Senators and Montreal Canadiens were also in attendance. Finally, on the third day, the preseason game between the Senators and Canadiens was held at the J.K. Irving Centre in Bouctouche. Goaltender Jake Allen, a native of Fredericton, New Brunswick, was in the lineup for the Canadiens. The Senators defeated the Canadiens 3–2 in overtime.

== Composition ==
Elsipogtog First Nation is composed of two parts as shown:

Community	Area	Location	Population	Date established
Richibucto 15	1,667.3 hectares (4,120 acres)	8 kilometres (5.0 mi) southwest of Five Rivers	1,937 (2016)	September 9, 1805
Soegao 35	104.732 hectares (258.80 acres)	5 kilometres (3.1 mi) west of Moncton	0	May 29, 2008

== Demographics ==
=== Richibucto 15 ===
Population trend

Census	Population	Change (%)
2016	1,937	▼2.4%
2011	1,985	▲4.6%
2006	1,897	▲12.0%
2001	1,693	▲20.7%
1996	1,403	▲9.4%
1991	1,282	▲14.7%
1986	1,118	▲16.0%
1981	964	N/A

Religious make-up (2001)

Religion	Population	Pct (%)
Catholic	1,560	92.04%
Protestant	0	0%
Other religions	85	5.01%
No religious affiliation	40	2.36%

Income (2015)

Income type	By CAD
Per capita income	$17,216
Median Household Income	$24,960
Median Family Income	$36,352

Mother tongue (2016)

Language	Population	Pct (%)
Mi'kmaq	1,100	56.9%
English	780	40.3%
French	20	1.0%
Other languages	10	0.5%
English and another language	25	1.3%

Education (2006)

Level of education	Population	Pct (%)
No certificate, diploma, or degree	580	45.31%
High school certificate or equivalent	235	18.36%
Apprenticeship or trades certificate or diploma	205	16.02%
College, CEGEP or other non-university certificate or diploma	180	14.06%
University certificate or diploma below the bachelor level	20	1.56%
University certificate, diploma or degree	65	5.08%

== Notable people ==
- Albert Levi — former chief and Order of Canada recipient
- Mildred Milliea — language instructor and Order of Canada recipient
- Everett Sanipass — former NHL player

== See also ==
- First Nations in Atlantic Canada
- First Nations in New Brunswick
- List of communities in New Brunswick
