= New Brunswick Route 116 =

Highway in New Brunswick, Canada

Route 116

Route information
- Maintained by New Brunswick Department of Transportation
- Length: 106 km (66 mi)
- Existed: 1965–present

Major junctions
- West end: Route 10 in Salmon Creek
- East end: Route 134 in Five Rivers

Location
- Country: Canada
- Province: New Brunswick
- Counties: Queens, Kent

Highway system
- Provincial highways in New Brunswick; Former routes
← Route 115	→ Route 117

Route 116 is a 106 km (66 mi) Canadian secondary highway in southeastern New Brunswick.

== Communities along Route 116 ==
- Fowlers Corner
- Briggs Corner
- Gaspereau Forks
- Castaway
- Mortimer
- Harcourt
- Bryants Corner
- Smiths Corner
- Bass River
- Molus River
- Five Rivers (Bonar Law Avenue)
- Elsipogtog_First_Nation (big cove band)

== See also ==
- List of New Brunswick provincial highways
