= Beersville, New Brunswick =

Community in New Brunswick, Canada

Beersville
- Location of Beersville in New Brunswick
- Coordinates: 46.443535°N 65.074167°W
- Country: Canada
- Province: New Brunswick
- County: Kent County
- Lowest elevation: 0 m (0 ft)
- Time zone: UTC-4 (Atlantic (AST))
  - Summer (DST): UTC-3 (ADT)
- Area code: 506

Beersville is a community in the Canadian province of New Brunswick, located in Weldford Parish. The community was named for John A. Beers (1860–1951). The community had a post office from 1900 to 1965. In 1904, Beersville was a farming settlement with 1 post office, 1 store, 1 sawmill, 1 church and a population of 100, and had a station on the Intercolonial Railway. Beersville is located on Route 465.

Beersville has a church (St. James Presbyterian Church), a local community center and was home of the local fire department for many years before it was moved to nearby Fords Mills.

== See also ==
- List of communities in New Brunswick
