= Bass River, Kent County =

Coordinates: 46.54434°N 65.113478°W

Location of Bass River in New Brunswick

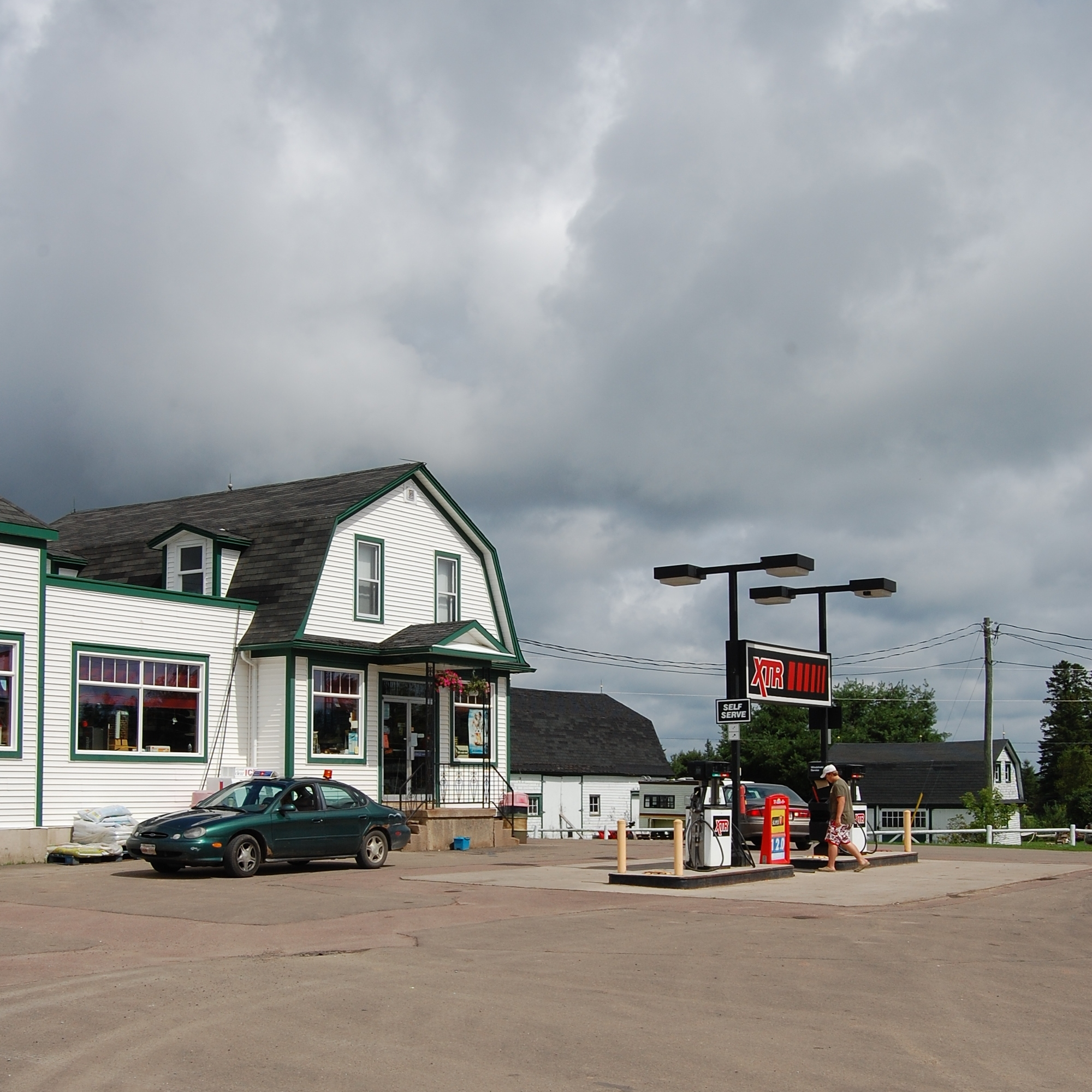
General store in Bass River, New Brunswick.

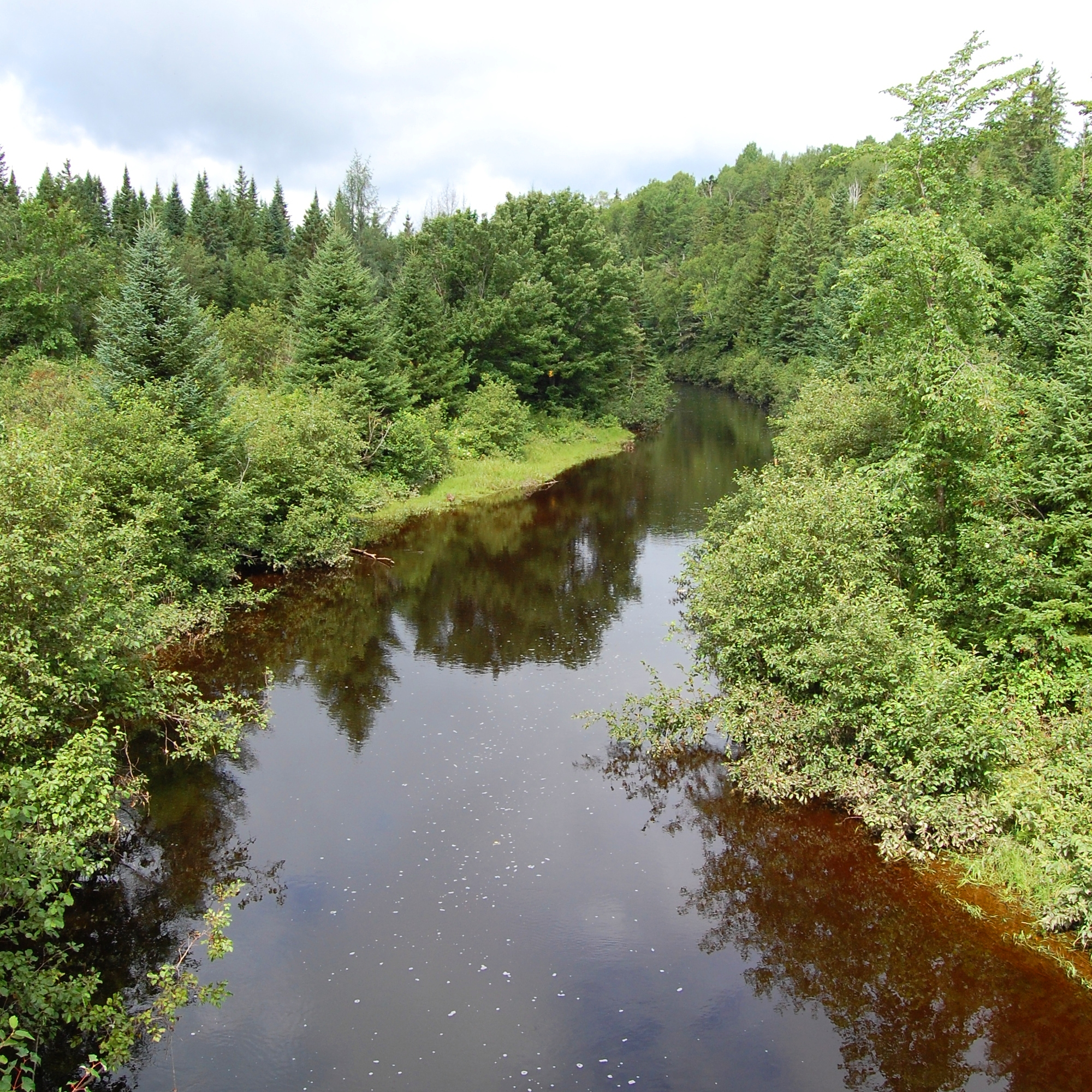
Bass River

Bass River is a small farming and forestry community located in Weldford Parish, New Brunswick that developed around the Bass River, a tributary of the Richibucto River. Bass River is located on the intersection of Route 116 and Route 490.

== History and overview ==
Bass River had a population of 400 in 1871, which declined to 350 by 1898.

== See also ==
- List of communities in New Brunswick
- List of people from Kent County, New Brunswick
