= Nouvelle-Arcadie =

Nouvelle-Arcadie Rogersville
- Village
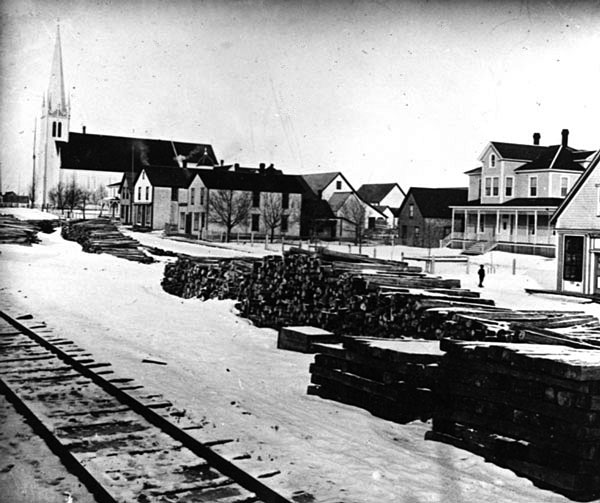
- Nouvelle-Arcadie in 1910

- Location within New Brunswick
- Coordinates: 46°43′00″N 65°25′00″W
- Country: Canada
- Province: New Brunswick
- County: Northumberland County
- Regional service commission: Kent
- Incorporated: January 1, 2023

Government
  - Mayor: Jimmy Bourque

Population (2021)
  - Total: 3,060
- Population estimate before 2023 local governance reform
- Time zone: UTC-4 (AST)
  - Summer (DST): UTC-3 (ADT)
- Area code: 506

Nouvelle-Arcadie is a village in the Canadian province of New Brunswick. It was formed through the 2023 New Brunswick local governance reform.

== History ==
Nouvelle-Arcadie was incorporated on January 1, 2023. I It was created through the amalgamation of the Village of Rogersville, the Local service district of Acadieville, the Local service district of Collette, the Local service district of Rogersville and portions of the Local Service Districts of Harcourt, Nelson, Saint-Louis de Kent and Weldford.

== Present day ==
It is served by Via Rail's train the Ocean which stops at the Rogersville railway station.

== Places of note ==
- Ocean Spray, Cranberry Fields

== Border municipalities ==
- Beausoleil
- Grand-Bouctouche
- Beaurivage
- Champdoré
- Five Rivers

== See also ==
- List of communities in New Brunswick
- List of municipalities in New Brunswick
