= Grand-Bouctouche =

Grand-Bouctouche Jipugtu'jg (Mi'kmaq)
- Town

- Nickname: Great Little Harbour
- Location within New Brunswick
- Coordinates: 46°28′23″N 64°43′29″W
- Country: Canada
- Province: New Brunswick
- County: Kent County
- Parish: Wellington Parish
- Founded: June 24, 1785
- Village: 1967
- Town: July 24, 1985

Government
  - Mayor: Aldéo Saulnier
  - Governing Body: Grand-Bouctouche Town Council

Area
  - Land: 18.33 km^{2} (7.08 sq mi)
- Highest elevation: 23 m (75 ft)
- Lowest elevation: 0 m (0 ft)

Population (2021)
  - Total: 2,513
  - Density: 137.1/km^{2} (355/sq mi)
  - Change 2016-2021: ▲6.4%
- Time zone: UTC−4 (AST)
  - Summer (DST): UTC−3 (ADT)
- Canadian Postal code: E4S
- Area code: 506
- Telephone Exchanges: 291 341 743 744 955
- Highway: Route 11
- Waterway: Bouctouche Harbour
- NTS Map: 021I07
- GNBC Code: DBBXR
- Website: villedebouctouche.ca/en

Grand-Bouctouche (/ˈbʌktuːʃ/ French pronunciation: [ɡʁɑ̃ buktuʃ]; Mi'kmaq: Jipugtu'jg) is a town in Kent County, New Brunswick, Canada.

== History ==
Bouctouche was originally named Tjipogtotjg (pronounced Chebooktoosk), a Mi'kmaq word meaning "Great Little Harbour".

The region was next settled by brothers Francois LeBlanc and Charles LeBlanc, and brothers Isidore Bastarache and Joseph Bastarache in 1785 as an Acadian community. "La Croix commémorative aux fondateurs de Bouctouche" was unveiled August 29, 1954, to pay tribute to the founders of the town, who first arrived in 1785. It says "We remember François and Hélène (née Breau) LeBlanc; Charlitte and first wife Marie (née Breau) LeBlanc, and his second wife Madeleine (née Girouard); and Joseph and Marie (née Girouard) Bastarache". The stones at the base of the cross indicate the origins of the settlers who came from France, Grand-Pré, Memramcook and Bouctouche. During the 19th century the area also attracted immigrants from Ireland and Scotland among them the forefathers of one of Bouctouche's best-known sons, K.C. Irving.

Bouctouche was struck by a tornado on August 6, 1879.

On 1 January 2023, Bouctouche was renamed Grand-Bouctouche and annexed the local service district (LSD) of Sainte-Anne-de-Kent and portions of the LSDs of the parish of Richibucto, the parish of Sainte-Marie, and the parish of Wellington. The community's name remains in official use.

Revised census figures have not been released.

== Geography ==
The town is located at the mouth of the Bouctouche River on the coast of the Northumberland Strait, approximately 40 kilometres (25 miles) northeast of Moncton.

It is the first municipality in New Brunswick to adopt a Green Plan for the working of the municipality in 2006.

=== Climate ===
Climate data for Grand-Bouctouche
| Month | Jan | Feb | Mar | Apr | May | Jun | Jul | Aug | Sep | Oct | Nov | Dec | Year |
|---|---|---|---|---|---|---|---|---|---|---|---|---|---|
| Record high °C (°F) | 13.9 (57.0) | 16.0 (60.8) | 22.8 (73.0) | 24.5 (76.1) | 34.4 (93.9) | 34.5 (94.1) | 35.5 (95.9) | 36.0 (96.8) | 32.5 (90.5) | 27.2 (81.0) | 22.0 (71.6) | 17.8 (64.0) | 36.0 (96.8) |
| Mean daily maximum °C (°F) | −4.0 (24.8) | −2.8 (27.0) | 1.4 (34.5) | 7.2 (45.0) | 14.9 (58.8) | 20.5 (68.9) | 24.4 (75.9) | 23.6 (74.5) | 18.8 (65.8) | 12.4 (54.3) | 5.5 (41.9) | −0.9 (30.4) | 10.1 (50.2) |
| Daily mean °C (°F) | −9 (16) | −7.7 (18.1) | −3.0 (26.6) | 3.0 (37.4) | 9.8 (49.6) | 15.2 (59.4) | 19.2 (66.6) | 18.5 (65.3) | 13.8 (56.8) | 7.9 (46.2) | 1.7 (35.1) | −5.1 (22.8) | 5.4 (41.7) |
| Mean daily minimum °C (°F) | −13.9 (7.0) | −12.6 (9.3) | −7.4 (18.7) | −1.2 (29.8) | 4.7 (40.5) | 9.9 (49.8) | 13.9 (57.0) | 13.2 (55.8) | 8.8 (47.8) | 3.3 (37.9) | −2.1 (28.2) | −9.2 (15.4) | 0.6 (33.1) |
| Record low °C (°F) | −32.5 (−26.5) | −30.5 (−22.9) | −27.5 (−17.5) | −13.9 (7.0) | −6.7 (19.9) | −0.6 (30.9) | 2.0 (35.6) | 2.5 (36.5) | −3.0 (26.6) | −7.8 (18.0) | −18.5 (−1.3) | −27.8 (−18.0) | −32.5 (−26.5) |
| Average precipitation mm (inches) | 104.2 (4.10) | 88.0 (3.46) | 93.1 (3.67) | 85.7 (3.37) | 100.5 (3.96) | 95.3 (3.75) | 99.1 (3.90) | 85.2 (3.35) | 86.3 (3.40) | 95.4 (3.76) | 102.9 (4.05) | 101.1 (3.98) | 1,136.6 (44.75) |
| Average rainfall mm (inches) | 30.6 (1.20) | 25.3 (1.00) | 35.4 (1.39) | 59.2 (2.33) | 97.5 (3.84) | 95.3 (3.75) | 99.1 (3.90) | 85.2 (3.35) | 86.3 (3.40) | 94.9 (3.74) | 85.1 (3.35) | 44.5 (1.75) | 838.3 (33.00) |
| Average snowfall cm (inches) | 73.6 (29.0) | 62.7 (24.7) | 57.6 (22.7) | 26.5 (10.4) | 3.0 (1.2) | 0.0 (0.0) | 0.0 (0.0) | 0.0 (0.0) | 0.0 (0.0) | 0.5 (0.2) | 17.8 (7.0) | 56.5 (22.2) | 298.3 (117.4) |
| Average precipitation days (≥ 0.2 mm) | 15.8 | 13.2 | 14.9 | 15.8 | 16.1 | 14.1 | 14.2 | 13.0 | 12.8 | 14.4 | 16.6 | 16.5 | 177.3 |
| Average rainy days (≥ 0.2 mm) | 4.7 | 4.3 | 6.6 | 11.8 | 16.0 | 14.1 | 14.2 | 13.0 | 12.8 | 14.3 | 13.5 | 6.4 | 131.5 |
| Average snowy days (≥ 0.2 cm) | 13.1 | 10.8 | 10.1 | 5.6 | 0.63 | 0.0 | 0.0 | 0.0 | 0.0 | 0.28 | 5.5 | 12.3 | 58.3 |
Source: Environment Canada

== Demographics ==
In the 2021 Census of Population conducted by Statistics Canada, Grand-Bouctouche had a population of 2,513 living in 1,094 of its 1,188 total private dwellings, a change of 6.4% from its 2016 population of 2,361. With a land area of 18.33 km^{2} (7.08 sq mi), it had a population density of 137.1/km^{2} (355.1/sq mi) in 2021.

Population trend

| Census | Population | Change (%) |
|---|---|---|
| 2021 | 2,513 | ▲6.4% |
| 2016 | 2,361 | ▼2.6% |
| 2011 | 2,423 | ▲1.7% |
| 2006 | 2,383 | ▼1.8% |
| 2001 | 2,426 | ▼1.3% |
| 1996 | 2,459 | ▲3.9% |
| 1991 | 2,364 | ▼2.3% |
| 1986 | 2,420 | ▼2.3% |
| 1981 | 2,476 | N/A |

Religious make-up (2001)

| Religion | Population | Pct (%) |
|---|---|---|
| Catholic | 2,275 | 97.85% |
| Protestant | 15 | 0.64% |
| No religious affiliation | 30 | 1.29% |

Income (2006)

| Income type | By CAD |
|---|---|
| Per capita income | $16,722 |
| Median Household Income | $38,807 |
| Median Family Income | $44,629 |

Mother Tongue language (2016)

| Language | Population | Pct (%) |
|---|---|---|
| French | 2,075 | 89.83% |
| English | 185 | 8.01% |
| Multiple responses | 30 | 1.30% |

== Tourist attractions ==
Bouctouche Bar Lighthouse
- Location: Bouctouche, New Brunswick, Canada
- Coordinates: 46°27′40″N 64°36′46″W

Tower
- Constructed: 1902 (first)
- Foundation: concrete base (current)
- Construction: wooden tower (both)
- Height: 8 metres (26 ft) (current); 10.6 metres (35 ft) (first)
- Shape: square truncated tower with balcony and lantern (current) quadrangular tower atop keeper's house (first)
- Markings: white tower and lantern, red lantern roof (current)
- Power source: solar power
- Operator: private

Light
- Focal height: 11 metres (36 ft) (current); 11.5 metres (38 ft) (first)
- Range: 7 nautical miles (13 km; 8.1 mi)
- Characteristic: Fl W 4s

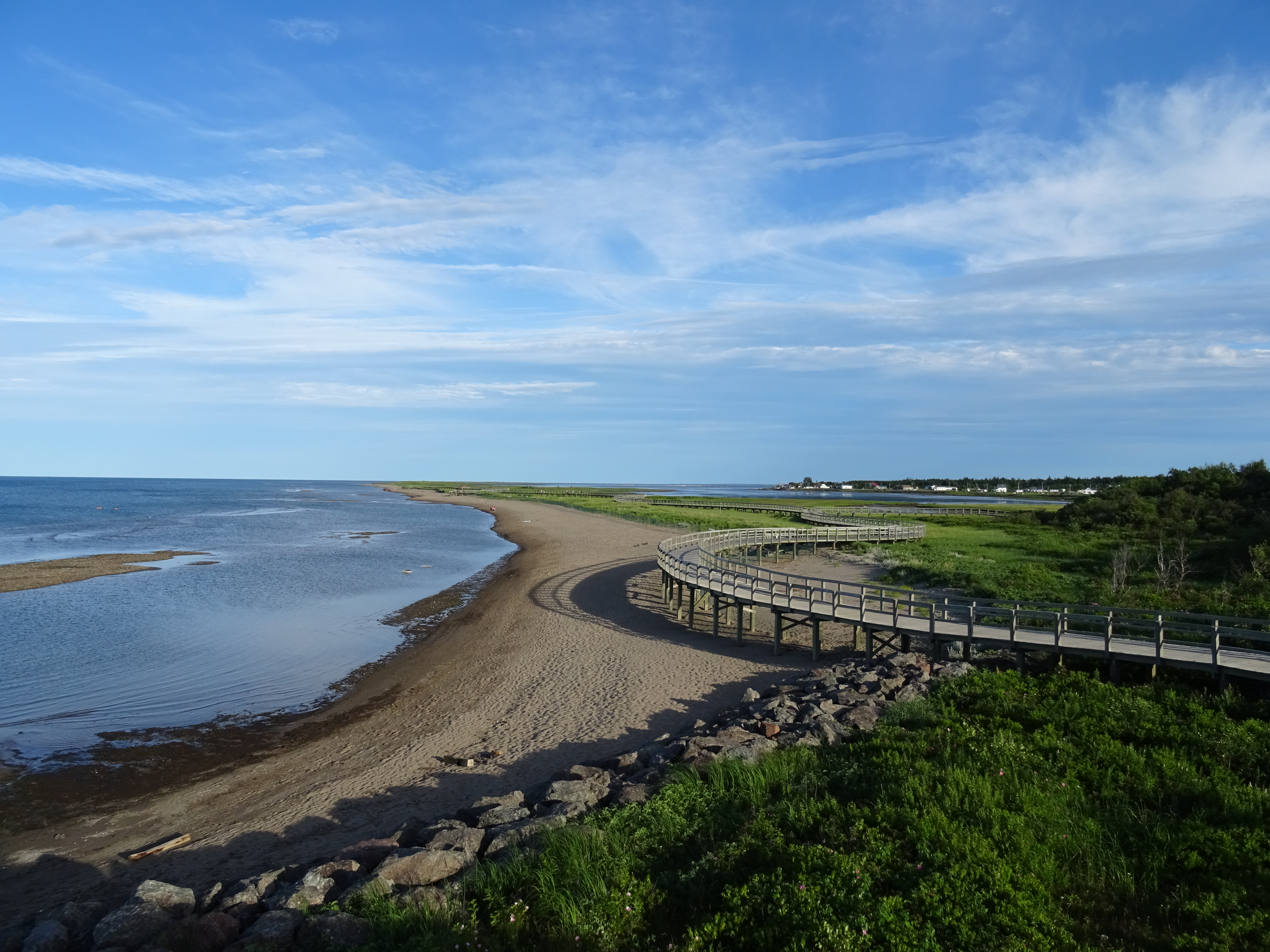
The boardwalk across the dunes at the Irving Eco-Centre

- La Dune de Bouctouche, known by its first inhabitants as the Great Little Harbour, has hiking and cycling trails that are part of the New Brunswick Trail system. There are 12 kilometres (7 miles) of whispering sands making up the dunes easily viewed from a boardwalk along a conservation area known as the Irving Eco Centre. La Dune de Bouctouche consists of a 9.7 km (6 miles) long ridge of sand formed over centuries by the wind and stormy seas. The dune has almost enclosed the bay area over its full length leaving an opening to the bay at its mouth that is a 1.8 km (1 mile) wide opening and the dune is still expanding today.
- Le Pays de la Sagouine, based on Antonine Maillet's award-winning book La Sagouine, is a theme park filled with Acadian entertainment and history. Their activities include dramatic reproductions of Antonine's plays.
- Irving Eco Centre Industrialist Kenneth Colin Irving was born in Bouctouche, many of his businesses, including Kent Homes, maintain operations there, and his descendants have set aside an area of natural resources to be protected.

== Sister cities ==
- St. Martinville, Louisiana, United States
- Châtellerault, France

== See also ==
- List of lighthouses in New Brunswick
