= Five Rivers, New Brunswick =

Five Rivers
- Village

- Location within New Brunswick
- Coordinates: 46°38′0″N 64°52′00″W
- Country: Canada
- Province: New Brunswick
- County: Kent County
- Regional service commission: Kent
- Incorporated: January 1, 2023

Government
  - Mayor: Kevin Scully
- Time zone: UTC-4 (AST)
  - Summer (DST): UTC-3 (ADT)

Five Rivers is a village in the Canadian province of New Brunswick. It was formed through the 2023 New Brunswick local governance reforms. It encompasses the former village of Rexton.

== History ==
Five Rivers was incorporated on January 1, 2023.

== Notable people ==
Five Rivers (Kingston at the time) was the birthplace of Bonar Law, Prime Minister of the United Kingdom in 1922–1923. Until the election of Boris Johnson in 2019, who was born in New York City, Law was the only British Prime Minister to be born outside the British Isles. His name is honoured at a recently upgraded community attraction, Bonar Law Common, and also at Bonar Law Memorial High School in Five Rivers. His father Rev. James Law was the Minister for St. Andrew's Church in Five Rivers (Rexton at the time) for many years. William John Bowser, Premier of British Columbia (1915–1916), was born in Rexton. Former Premier of New Brunswick, Shawn Graham, was raised in Rexton.

== See also ==
- List of communities in New Brunswick
- List of municipalities in New Brunswick
