= Richibucto River =

River in New Brunswick, Canada

Coordinates: 46.621089°N 64.91744°W

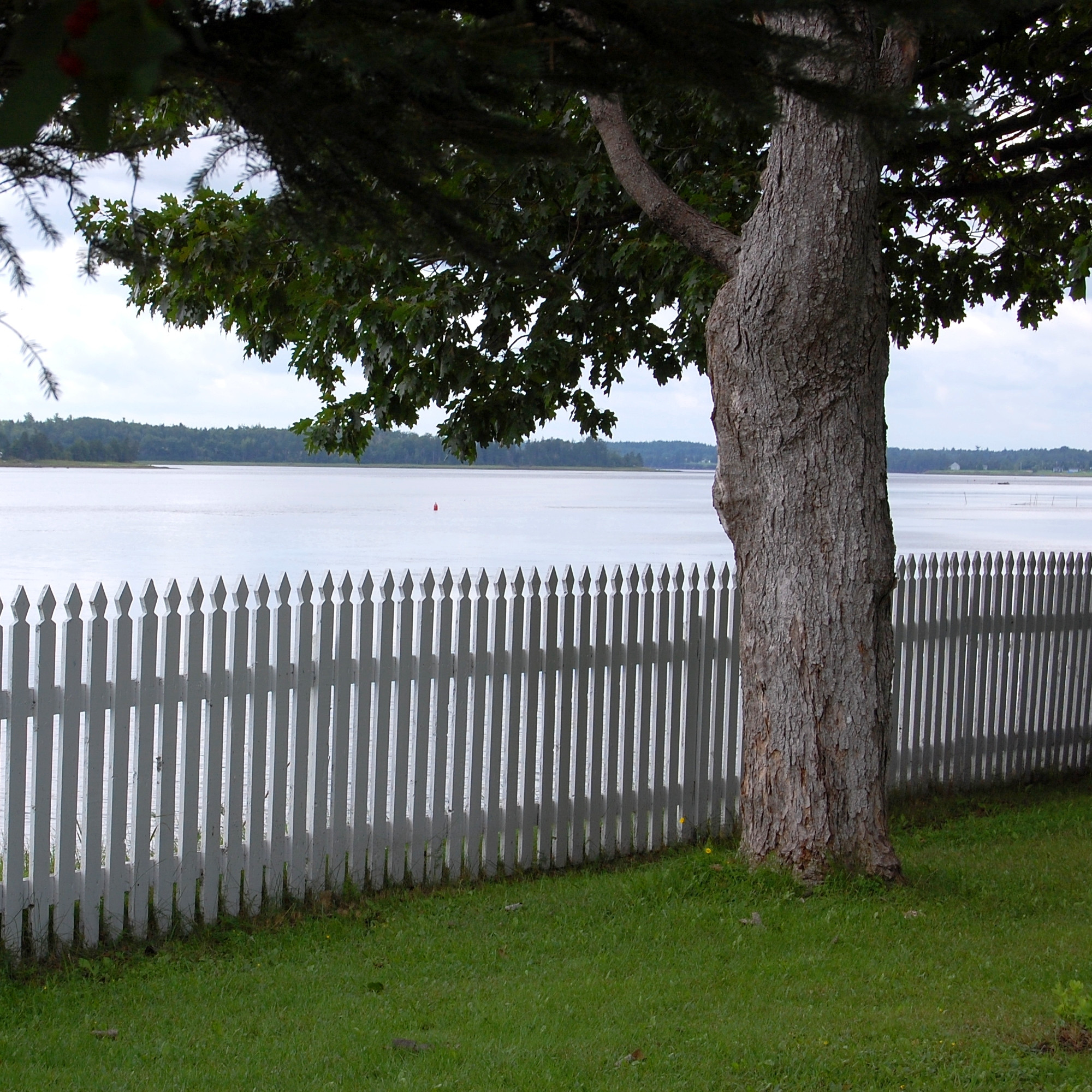
Richibucto River, view from the boyhood home of Bonar Law

The Richibucto River is a river in eastern New Brunswick, Canada which empties into the Northumberland Strait north of Richibucto. It is 80 kilometres long.

The river's name means "river of fire" in the Mi'kmaq language.

Other villages situated along the river include Five Rivers and Elsipogtog First Nation. Bonar Law, the British prime minister, was raised along the river.

== Tributaries ==
- Bass River, Weldford Parish, New Brunswick
- Coal Branch River
- Molus River
- St. Nicholas River
  - East Branch St. Nicholas River
  - South Branch St. Nicholas River
  - West Branch St. Nicholas River
- St. Charles River

== River communities ==
- Browns Yard
- Elsipogtog First Nation
- Jardineville
- Jerrys Island
- Lower Main River
- Five Rivers
- Richibucto
- Upper Rexton

== River crossings ==
- Route 11
- Route 134
- Route 490
- Indian House Road

== See also ==
- List of bodies of water of New Brunswick
