= Arcadia =

Arcadia may refer to:

== Arts and media ==
=== Film and television ===
- Arcadia (2012 film), an American film
- Arcadia (2024 film), a Greek film
- "Arcadia" (The X-Files), a 1999 television episode
- Arcadia, a fictional city on Gallifrey in the Doctor Who series
- Arcadia, a fictional location in Resident Evil: Afterlife
- Tales of Arcadia, a trilogy of animated television series created by Guillermo del Toro
- Arcadia (TV series), a Belgian-Dutch science fiction television series

=== Gaming ===
- American Arcadia, a 2023 puzzle-platformer video game by Out of the Blue
- Arcadia (card game), a 1996 collectible card game by White Wolf Publishing
- Arcadia (video game), a 1982 game for the Vic 20 and ZX Spectrum platforms
- Arcadia 2001, a console
- Arcadia (Dungeons & Dragons), a fictional plane of existence in Dungeons & Dragons
- Arcadia (The Longest Journey), a fantasy realm in The Longest Journey
- Arcadia Bay, a fictional location in Life Is Strange
- Arcadia, a human colony in Halo Wars
- Arcadia, a playable character in Brawlhalla
- Neo Arcadia, a location in Mega Man Zero

=== Literature and drama ===
- Arcadia (character), in Marvel Comics
- Arcadia (magazine), a 2005 Colombian magazine on arts, literature and movies
- Arcadia (play), 1993, by Tom Stoppard
- Arcadia (poem), 1504, by Jacopo Sannazaro
- The Countess of Pembroke's Arcadia or Arcadia, a prose work by Sir Philip Sidney
- Monthly Arcadia (月刊アルカディア), a 2000 Japanese video and arcade game magazine
- Arcadia, a 1979 poetry collection by Christopher Reid
- Arcadia, a fictional spaceship in Space Pirate Captain Harlock
- Arcadia, a 2015 book by Iain Pears
- Arcadia, a 1970 book by Mark Lane

=== Music ===
- Arcadia (band), a British pop music group composed of members from Duran Duran
- Arcadia (Ramona Lisa album), a 2014 album by Caroline Polachek, under the name Ramona Lisa
- Arcadia (Alison Krauss & Union Station album), 2025
- "Arcadia" (Hardwell and Joey Dale song), 2014
- "Arcadia" (Lana Del Rey song), 2021
- Arcadia, a mid-1990s London club night, central to the Romo movement
- "Arcadia", a 2015 song by the Kite String Tangle

=== Visual arts ===
- Arcadia (painting), 1883, by Thomas Eakins
- Arcadia, a 1973 artwork by Ian Hamilton Finlay
- Arcadia, an 1893 mural by Amanda Brewster Sewell
- Arcadia, a painting by Eugeniusz Zak

=== Other uses in arts and media ===
- Arcadia Spectacular, a performance art collective that builds electronic dance music stages
- Arcadia Productions, an Italian theatre company

== Businesses ==
- Arcadia Brewing Company, a former brewery in Kalamazoo, Michigan
- Arcadia Corporation, the original name of video game company Starpath
- Arcadia Group, formerly a British retail company
- Arcadia Machine & Tool, commonly known as AMT, an American firearms company
- Arcadia Publishing, an American publisher of local community histories
- Arcadia Systems, an arcade game division of the company Mastertronic

== Places ==
=== Australia ===
- Arcadia, New South Wales, a suburb of Sydney
- Arcadia, Queensland
- Arcadia, Victoria

=== Canada ===
- Arcadia, New Brunswick
- Arcadia, Nova Scotia

=== Greece ===
- Arcadia (region), in the central Peloponnese
- Arcadia (regional unit), a modern administrative unit covering the region
- Arcadia (constituency), an electoral district covering the region
- Kyparissia in Messenia, a town known in the Middle Ages as Arcadia
  - Barony of Arcadia, a medieval Frankish fiefdom of the Principality of Achaea
- Arcadia (Crete), a town and city-state of ancient Crete

=== Ukraine ===
- Arcadia (Odesa), a quarter in Odesa
  - Arcadia Beach
  - Arcadia Park, Odesa

=== United States ===
==== Populated places ====
- Arcadia (Phoenix), a neighborhood in Phoenix and Scottsdale, Arizona
- Arcadia, California
- Arcadia, Florida
- Arcadia, Illinois
- Arcadia, Indiana
- Arcadia, Iowa
- Arcadia, Kansas
- Arcadia, Louisiana
- Arcadia, Maryland
- Arcadia, Michigan
- Arcadia Lake (Michigan)
- Arcadia, Mississippi
- Arcadia, Missouri
- Arcadia, Nebraska
- Arcadia, New York
- Arcadia, North Carolina
- Arcadia, Ohio
- Arcadia, Oklahoma
- Arcadia, Pennsylvania
- Arcadia, Rhode Island
- Arcadia, South Carolina
- Arcadia, Tennessee
- Arcadia, Santa Fe, Texas
- Arcadia, Shelby County, Texas
- Arcadia, Botetourt County, Virginia
- Arcadia, Spotsylvania County, Virginia
- Arcadia, Washington
- Arcadia, Wisconsin
- Arcadia (town), Wisconsin
- Arcadia Lake (Oklahoma)
- Arcadia Management Area, Rhode Island
- Arcadia Township (disambiguation)

==== Buildings and properties ====
- Arcadia (house), a historic house in Frederick, Maryland
- Arcadia (Los Angeles Metro station)
- Arcadia Plantation, a historic plantation near Georgetown, South Carolina

=== Elsewhere ===
- Arcadia, Tucumán, Argentina
- Arcadia Aegypti, an ancient region of Roman-controlled Egypt
- Arcadia, Pretoria, a residential suburb in South Africa
- Arcadia, a suburb of Harare, Zimbabwe
- Arcadia Park (Warsaw), an urban park in Warsaw, Poland
- Arcadia Planitia, a plain on Mars

== Schools ==
- Academy of Arcadia, a historical Italian literary academy
- Arcadia College, Missouri
- Arcadia University, Glenside, Pennsylvania
- Arcadia High School (disambiguation)

== Vehicles ==
=== Ships ===
- See List of ships named Arcadia
- Arcadia (steamboat), which operated in the state of Washington, US
- MV Arcadia (1988) or MV Columbus, a cruise ship
- MV Arcadia (2004), a cruise ship
- SS Arcadia (1922)
- SS Arcadia (1953)
- USS Arcadia (SP-856), a patrol boat possibly in commission during 1918
- USS Arcadia (ID-1605), a troop transport commissioned in 1919
- USS Arcadia (AD-23), a destroyer tender commissioned in 1945

=== Other vehicles ===
- Arcadia 30, a French sailboat design
- Arcadia, one of four Rolls-Royce Droptail cars

== Other uses ==
- Arcadia (utopia), a utopian vision of pastoralism and harmony with nature
- Arcadia (daughter of Arcadius) (400–444)
- Arcadia (engineering), a system and software architecture engineering method
- Arcadia (genus), an extinct genus of temnospondyl amphibian
- Arcadia Conference, a 1942 military conference held in Washington DC
- Arcadia Fund, a foundation sponsoring preservation of media for culture, nature, and scholarship

== See also ==
- Arcadian (disambiguation)
- Arcadians (disambiguation)
- The Arcadians (disambiguation)
- Arcade (disambiguation)
- Arcady (disambiguation)
- Acadia (disambiguation)
- Arkadia (disambiguation)
