= List of ships named Arcadia =

Ship name

A number of ships have been named Arcadia, including:

== Merchant ships ==
- SS Arcadia (1887), a passenger liner built by Harland & Wolff for P&O, in service 1888–1915
- SS Arcadia (1896), a cargo ship built by Harland and Wolff for Hamburg America Line, in service 1897–1926
- SS Arcadia (1922), a cargo ship in service with Hamburg America Line 1922–1934
- Arcadia (steamboat) (1929), a steamboat that operated in the state of Washington, United States
- SS Arcadia (1953), a passenger liner and cruise ship of P&O, in service 1954–1979
- MV Arcadia (1988), a cruise ship in service under that name with P&O Cruises 1997–2003
- MV Arcadia (2004), a cruise ship of P&O cruises, in service since 2005

== Naval ships ==
- USS Arcadia (SP-856), a patrol boat possibly in commission during 1918
- USS Arcadia (ID-1605), a troop transport in commission from January to September 1919
- USS Arcadia (AD-23), a destroyer tender in commission from 1945 to 1968

== See also ==
- Ships named Arcadian
