= USS Arcadia =

USS Arcadia has been the name of more than one United States Navy ship, and may refer to:

- USS Arcadia (SP-856), a patrol boat possibly in commission during 1918
- USS Arcadia (ID-1605), a troop transport in commission from January to September 1919
- USS Arcadia (AD-23), a destroyer tender in commission from 1945 to 1968

== See also ==
- USS Arcady (SP-577)
