= Akadia =

Akadia may refer to:

- Akadia, Gujarat, a village in western India
- Akadia State, a former petty Rajput princely state with seat in the above town

== See also ==
- Acadia (disambiguation)
- Akkadian (disambiguation)
