= Acadia (disambiguation) =

Acadia was a historical French colony in northeastern North America which included parts of what are now the Maritime provinces, the Gaspé Peninsula and Maine to the Kennebec River.

Acadia may also refer to:

== Places ==
=== Canada ===
- Acadia (region), a North American cultural region in the Maritime provinces
- Municipal District of Acadia No. 34, Alberta
- Acadia (federal electoral district), former district, Alberta
- Acadie (electoral district), former district in Montreal, Quebec
- Acadia River, tributary of the Richelieu River, Quebec
- Acadia University, in Wolfville, Nova Scotia

=== Pitcairn Islands ===
- Acadia Islet, part of the Ducie Island atoll, Pitcairn Islands (British Overseas Territory), in the Pacific Ocean

=== United States ===
- Acadia National Park, in Maine
- Acadia Parish, Louisiana, established 1886
- A proposed partition of northern Maine; see List of U.S. state partition proposals § Maine

== Biology ==
- Acadia (genus), a genus in the Mycetophilidae family of fungus gnats described by Vockeroth in 1980

== Transport ==
- CSS Acadia, a museum ship in Halifax, Nova Scotia
- USAHS Acadia, SS Acadia (1932) converted to Army hospital ship 1941
- USS Acadia (AD-42), a Yellowstone-class destroyer tender
- GMC Acadia, a 2007 crossover sport-utility vehicle (SUV)

== Other uses ==
- ACADIA, a non-profit organization active in the area of computer-aided architectural design
- Acadia Healthcare
- Acadia Pharmaceuticals
- Acadia (technical partnership), a joint venture in storage between Cisco, EMC, VMWare and Intel
- Acadia trees in RuneScape, an intentional misspelling of Acacia

== See also ==
- Acadiana
- Acadian (disambiguation)
- Acadie (disambiguation)
- Accadia, a town in Apulia, Italy
- Akadia (disambiguation)
- Akkadian (disambiguation)
- Arcadia (disambiguation)
- Cascadia (disambiguation)
