= Arcadia, Virginia =

Arcadia, Virginia may refer to:

- Arcadia, Botetourt County, Virginia
- Arcadia, Spotsylvania County, Virginia
