= Arkadia (disambiguation) =

Arkadia, or Arcadia, is a region of Greece.

Arkadia may also refer to:

== Places ==
- Arkadia (Crete), a town and city-state of ancient Crete, Greece
- Arkadia, Łowicz County in Łódź Voivodeship (central Poland), with the English Garden Park
- Arkadía, older name of Kyparissia, Greece
- Arkadia Hill (Arkadianmäki), location of the Parliament House, Helsinki and a metonym for the Parliament of Finland
- Arkadia (shopping mall), a shopping mall in Warsaw, Poland
- Arkadia, a large shopping center situated on the island on Gozo, in the Maltese archipelago

== Art and entertainment ==
- "Arkadia", a song by Babymetal from the album Metal Galaxy
- Arkadia, a fictional walled settlement built by the Skaikru, in The 100 TV series
- Arkadia Records, an American record label
- Spartakus and the Sun Beneath the Sea, a French animated series, known in some countries as Arkadia
- Arkadia, a fictional planet in an episode of Space: 1999 (TV series).

== See also ==
- Arcadia (disambiguation)
