= Arcadia Township, Michigan =

Arcadia Township is the name of several places in the U.S. state of Michigan:

- Arcadia Township, Lapeer County, Michigan
- Arcadia Township, Manistee County, Michigan
- Arcadia Township, Kalamazoo County, Michigan, the former name of Kalamazoo Township until 1836

== See also ==
- Arcadia Township (disambiguation)
- Arcada Township, Michigan
