= Acadie =

Acadie may refer to:

- Acadia, French name for the former French colony today comprising roughly the Canadian provinces of Nova Scotia, New Brunswick, and Prince Edward Island
- Acadia (region), region where Acadians live today
- Acadie (album), the debut album by record producer and singer-songwriter Daniel Lanois
- Acadie–Bathurst, a federal electoral district in New Brunswick, Canada
- Acadie (electoral district), a provincial electoral district in Quebec, Canada
- Acadie (Montreal Metro), a station on the Blue Line of the Montreal Metro rapid transit system
- Acadie Siding, New Brunswick, a community in Kent County, New Brunswick, Canada
- Acadie, New Brunswick, a community in Kent County, New Brunswick, Canada
- L'Acadie blanc, a grape variety
- L'Acadie, Quebec, a town in the Montérégie region
- Place d'Acadie, a public square in the 6th arrondissement of Paris

== See also ==
- Acadia (disambiguation)
- Acadieman, a cartoon figure
- Acadieville Parish, New Brunswick
