= Arcadia (steamboat) =

American commercial steamboat

- Arcadia, July 12, 1937, chartered for the annual excursion of carriers for the Tacoma Times.

History
- Name: Arcadia (later J.E. Overlade; Virginia VI)
- Owner: Berntson & Lorenz; U.S. Bureau of Prisons; James F. "Cy" Devenny (dba Puget Sound Excursion Lines).
- Port of registry: Tacoma, Washington
- In service: 1929
- Identification: U.S. registry #229258
- Notes: Served as a prison tender from 1942 to 1950.

General characteristics
- Type: inland passenger/freighter, later an excursion vessel.
- Length: 99 ft (30.18 m) or 99 ft (30.18 m)
- Beam: 25.3 ft (7.71 m)
- Depth of hold: 6.0 ft (1.83 m)
- Installed power: steam engine
- Propulsion: propeller
- Capacity: As built: 275 passengers; 100 tons of freight.

The steamboat Arcadia, built in 1929, was one of the last commercial steamboats placed into service on Puget Sound. The vessel later served as a prison tender under the name J.E. Overlade, and after that, as Virginia VI, as an excursion vessel.

== Construction and design ==
Arcadia was built in 1929 at the Mojean Ericson shipyard in Arcadia, Washington for Capt. Bernt L. Berntson (b.1896, retired 1955). Arcadia was 99 ft (30.18 m) feet long according to one (later) source or 89 ft (27.13 m) according to a contemporary vessel registry. Arcadia had a beam of 25.3 ft (7.71 m) and a depth of hold of 6 ft (1.83 m). The overall size of the vessel was 102 gross and 80 registered tons.

The ship was named after Arcadia, Washington. Arcadia was one of only four of the once-numerous small steamships of Puget Sound that was built after 1920, the others being the Concordia, the Vashona (later known as Sightseer and Columbia Queen), and the still-extent Virginia V.

The engine and boiler for Arcadia came from the dismantled steamship Sentinel, which Arcadia was intended to replace. As built, Arcadia could carry 275 passengers and 100 tons of freight. The ship was assigned U.S. registry number 229258.

== Operation ==
Arcadia was placed on the upper Puget Sound route served by the partnership of Ed Lorenz and Bernt L. Berntson with their steamship Sentinel. This route ran from Tacoma to Henderson Bay. The daily run for Arcadia went from Lakebay, Washington to Tacoma, stopping along the way at Home, Arletta, Anchorage, Warren, Sunnybay, Cromwell, Sylvan, Wollochet, and Cedrona.

Following the death of Ed Lorenz in 1941, Berntson, who himself had been ill at the time, sold Arcadia to the government for use as a tender for the penitentiary on McNeil Island. At that time, 1942, Arcadia was the last passenger and freight steamer operating between Tacoma and points in upper Puget Sound. The government renamed the vessel J.E. Overlade (a former warden, converted it to diesel and used it to service the prison.

In 1959 the government sold J.E. Overlade to Puget Sound Excursion Lines, a company which was controlled by Seattle businessman James F. "Cy" Devenny (born c.1896). Devenny, dba Puget Sound Excursion Lines then also owned Virginia V, another of the few surviving steamers of the Puget Sound Mosquito Fleet, as well as other older vessels, including the Burro, which he had renamed Carolyn M. (after his wife), and the motor vessel Imperial and the large older yachts El Primero and Aquilo.

Devenny renamed J.E. Overlade (ex-Arcadia) as the Virginia VI. Following some conversion work, ran it in coordination with the Virginia V in their tour and excursion business. Except for the yachts, Devenny ran the vessels on a regular basis. Because of the requirements of keeping them maintained sufficiently to meet Coast Guard inspections, he has been credited with keeping them in existence for many years past what might have been expected to be the limits of their useful lives.

== Disposition ==
In 1967, Devenny sold Virginia VI (ex-Arcadia) to an Alaskan, W.R. Lebo Jr.

== See also ==
- Puget Sound Mosquito Fleet

== Bibliography ==
- Findlay, Jean Cammon, and Paterson, Robin, Mosquito Fleet of South Puget Sound (Arcadia 2008) ISBN 978-0-7385-5607-9
- Kline, Mary S., Steamboat Virginia V (Documentary Book Publishers 1985) ISBN 0-935503-00-5
- Newell, Gordon R. ed., H.W. McCurdy Marine History of the Pacific Northwest, Superior Publishing, Seattle WA (1966)
- Newell, Gordon R., Ships of the Inland Sea -- The Story of the Puget Sound Steamboats, Binford & Mort (2d Ed. 1960)
