= Arcadians =

Arcadians may refer to:

- Arcadians, an ancient Greek tribe of the namesake region
- Residents of Arcadia, Greece
- The Arcadians (choir), a choir in Oxford, England
- The Arcadians (musical), a 1909 long-running musical theatre comedy
- Arcadians (video game), a 1982 computer game by Acornsoft for the BBC Micro and Acorn Electron
- Arcadians (theater group) a theater group located in Wollongong, Australia

== See also ==
- Arcadia (disambiguation)
- Arcadian (disambiguation)
- Acadians, descendants of the French settlers in Quebec
