= Arcadia Park (Odesa) =

Park in Arcadia quarter, Odesa, Ukraine

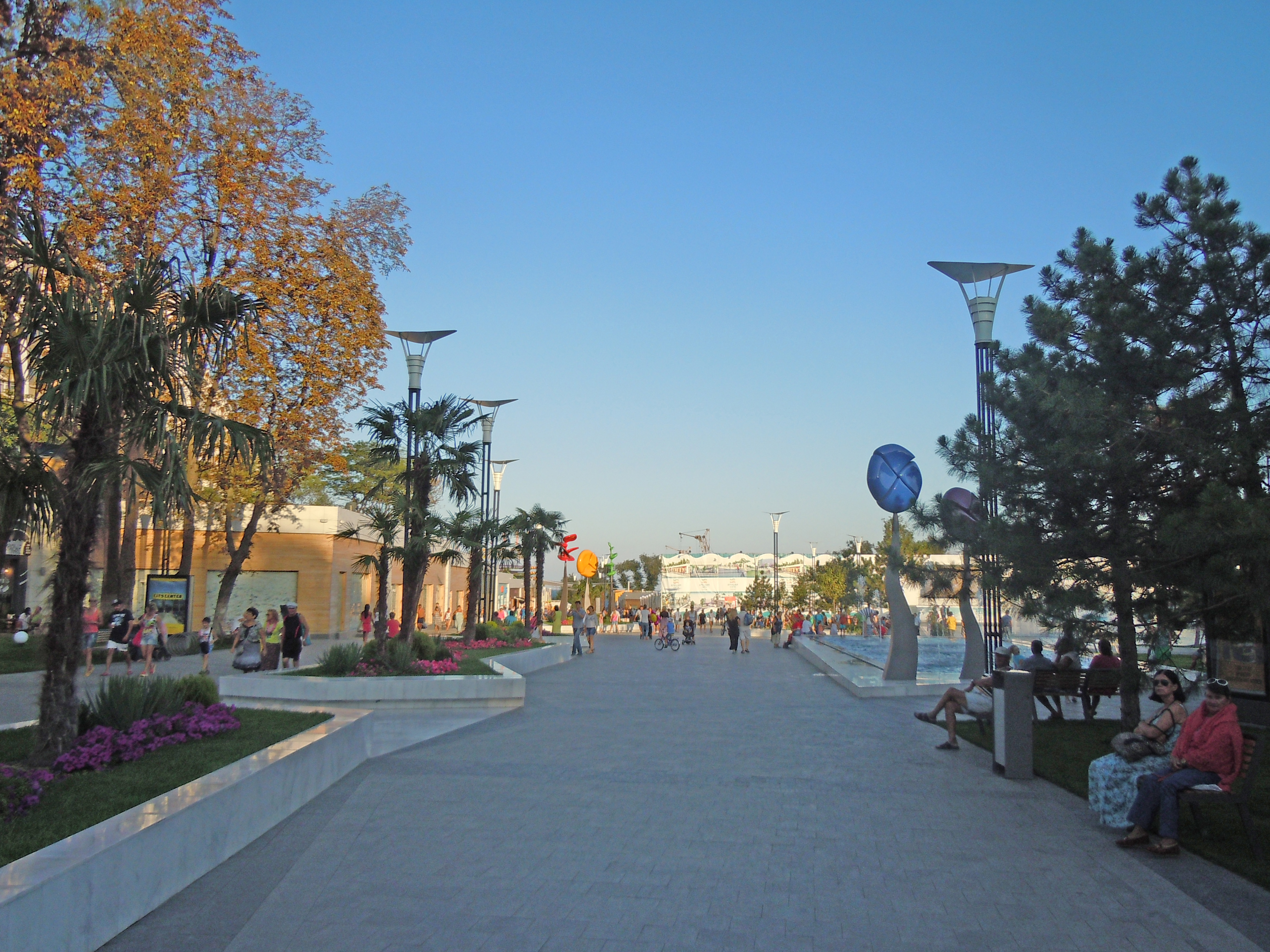
- The view of the Central avenue
- Interactive map of Arcadia Park
- Type: Park
- Location: Arcadia
- Coordinates: 46°25′41″N 30°45′57″E

Arcadia Park (Ukrainian: Парк Аркадія, Park Arkadiya) is a small park in Odesa, Ukraine, located up to 2014 in the historical quarter Arcadia, at the end of the Genuezska Street, down from the 10th of April Square, on the coast of the Gulf of Odesa.

The park is known for its numerous restaurants, bars and nightclubs. The famous Arcadia Beach is located here. The best known place in the park is its Central Avenue, which threads down from Genuezska Street to the sea coast, where the beach is located.

Extensive reconstruction of the park, mostly on its Central Avenue, was started in January 2014. Nearly all the plants and greenery were demolished, and the central avenue was covered with granite pavement tiles. Also, massive marble fountains and planters were constructed. The fountains are covered by plywood in the winter time. A few trees, mainly pines and palms, imported from Italy, were planted.

== Gallery ==
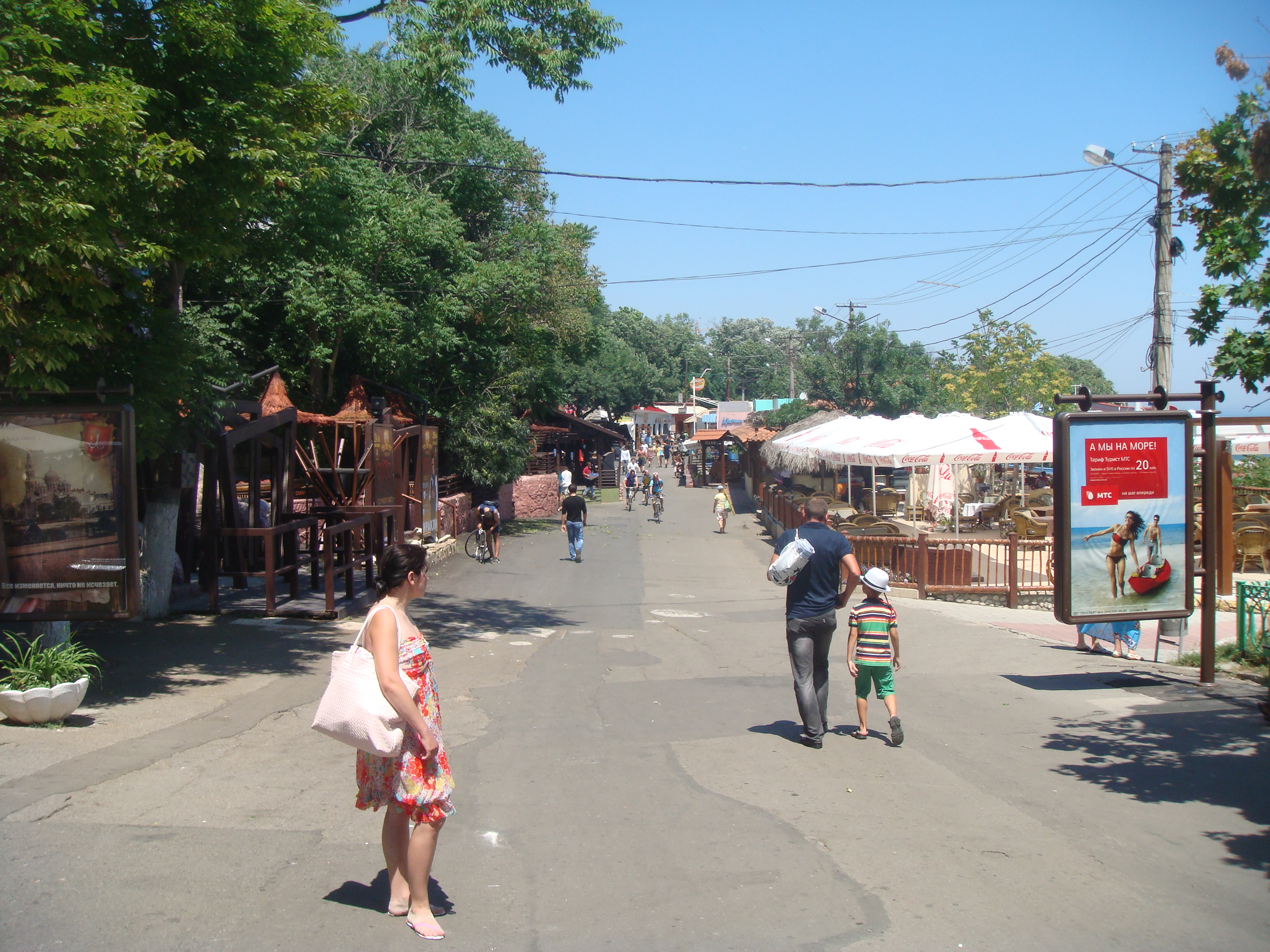
Coastal avenues

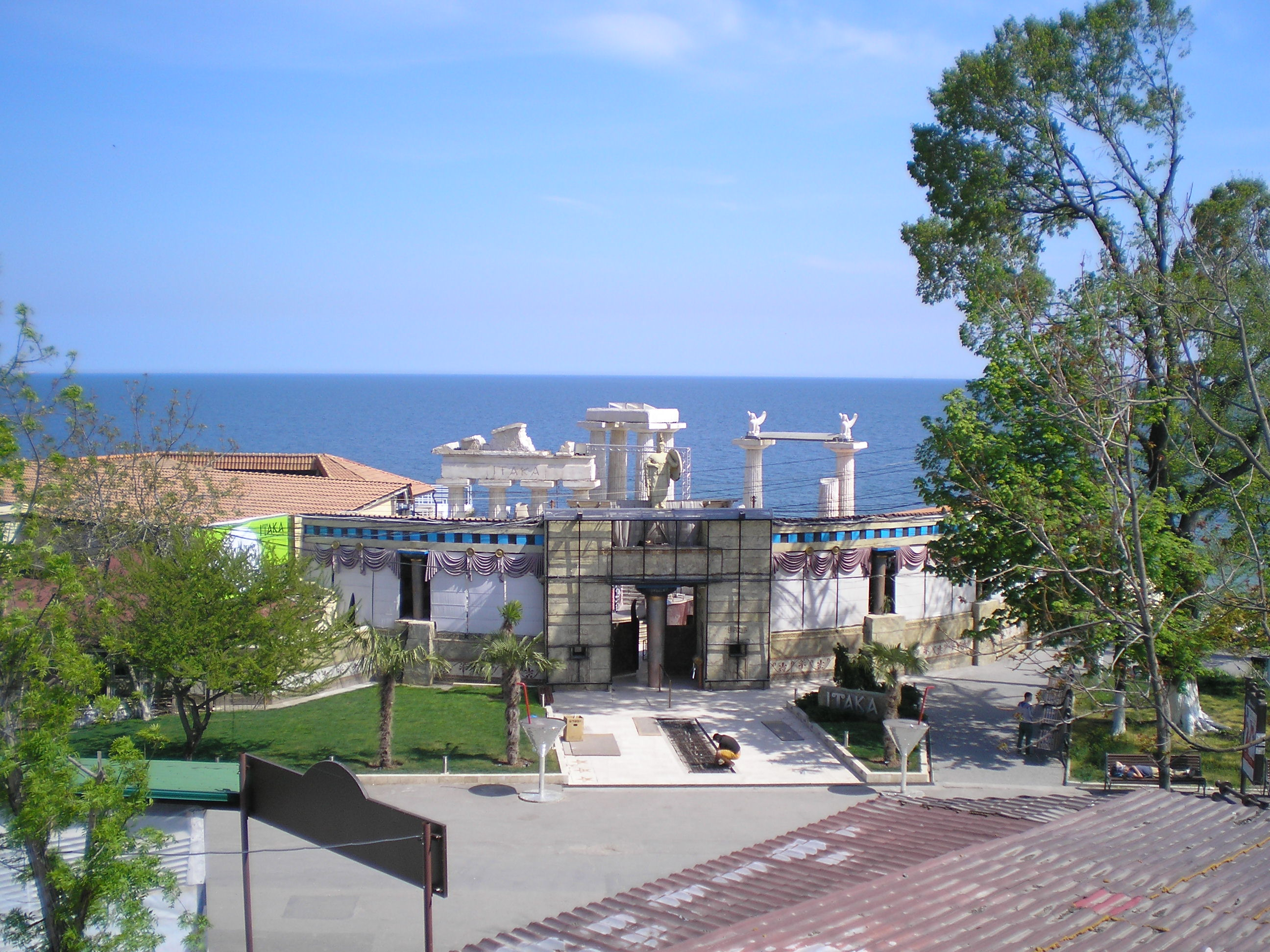
Sea view

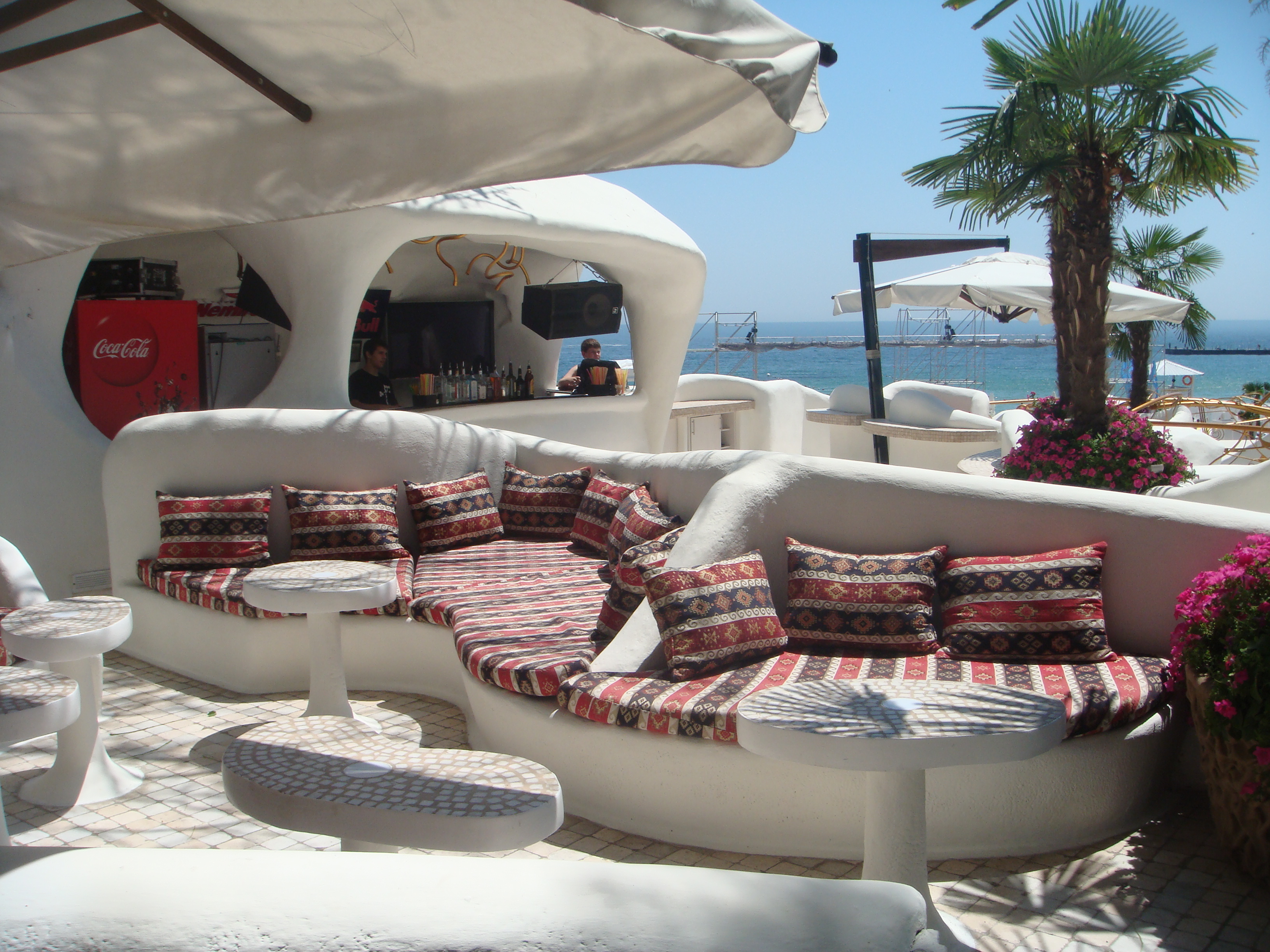
"Ibiza" Nightclub

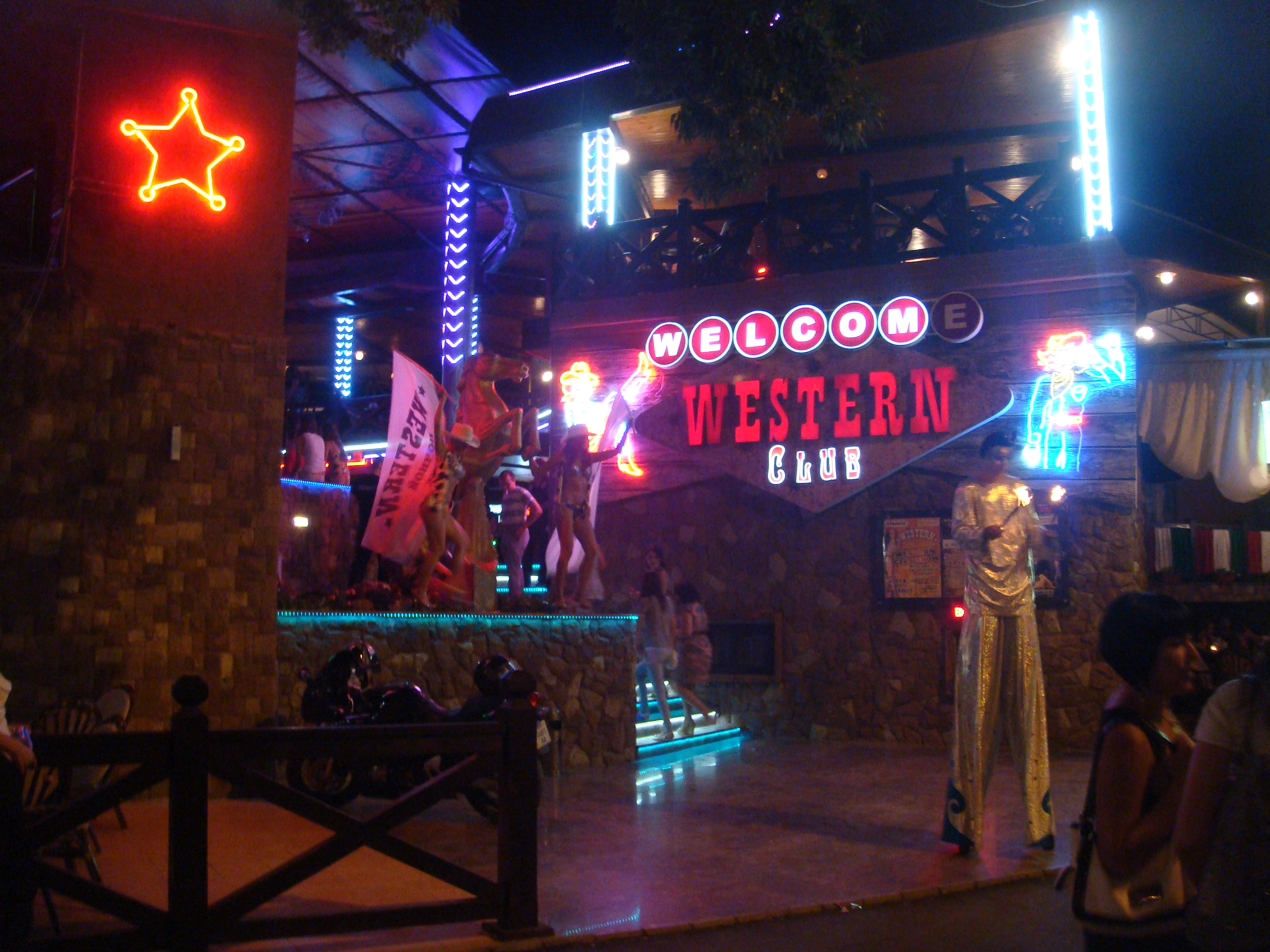
"Western" Nightclub

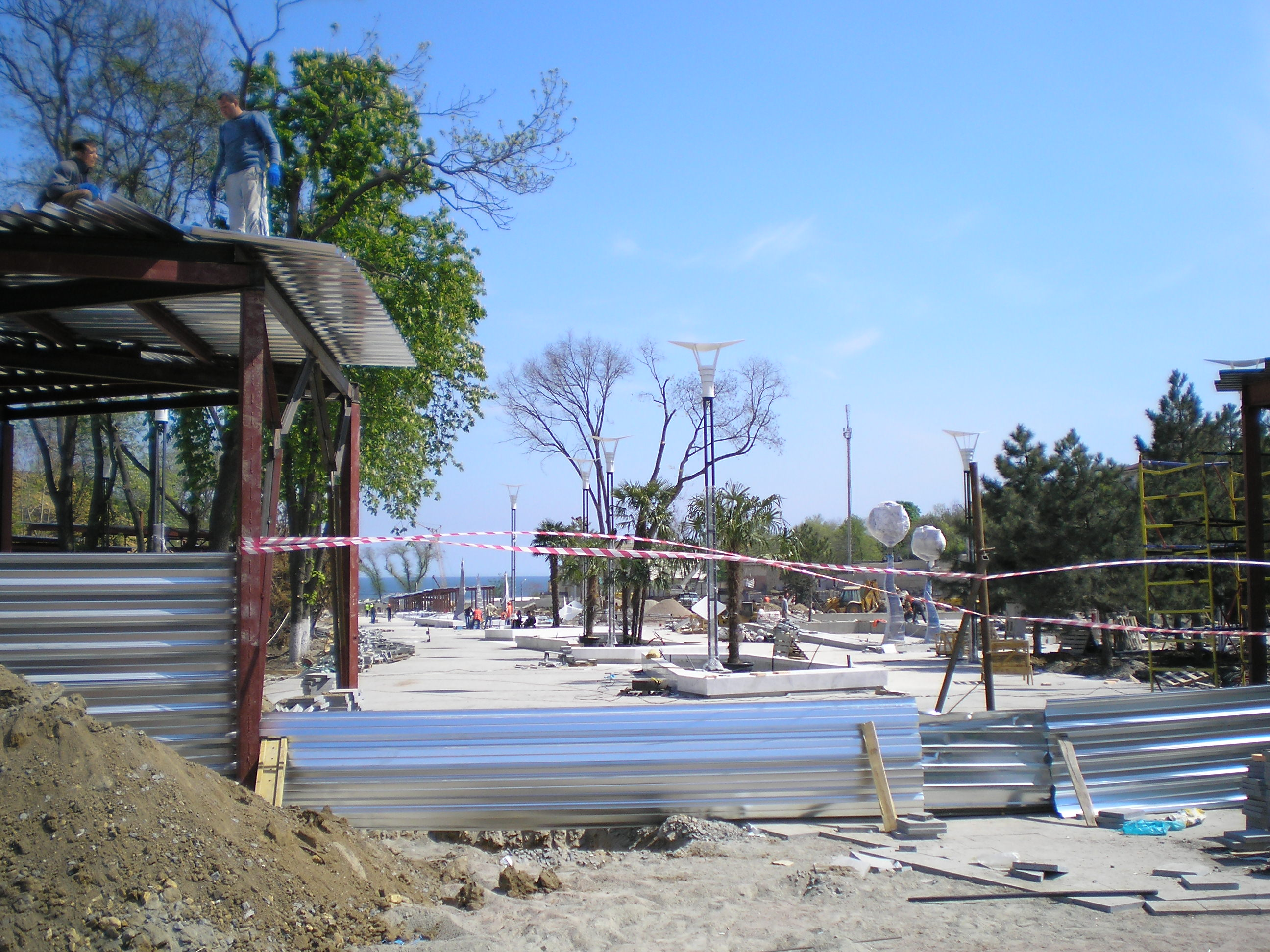
Central avenue during the reconstrustion

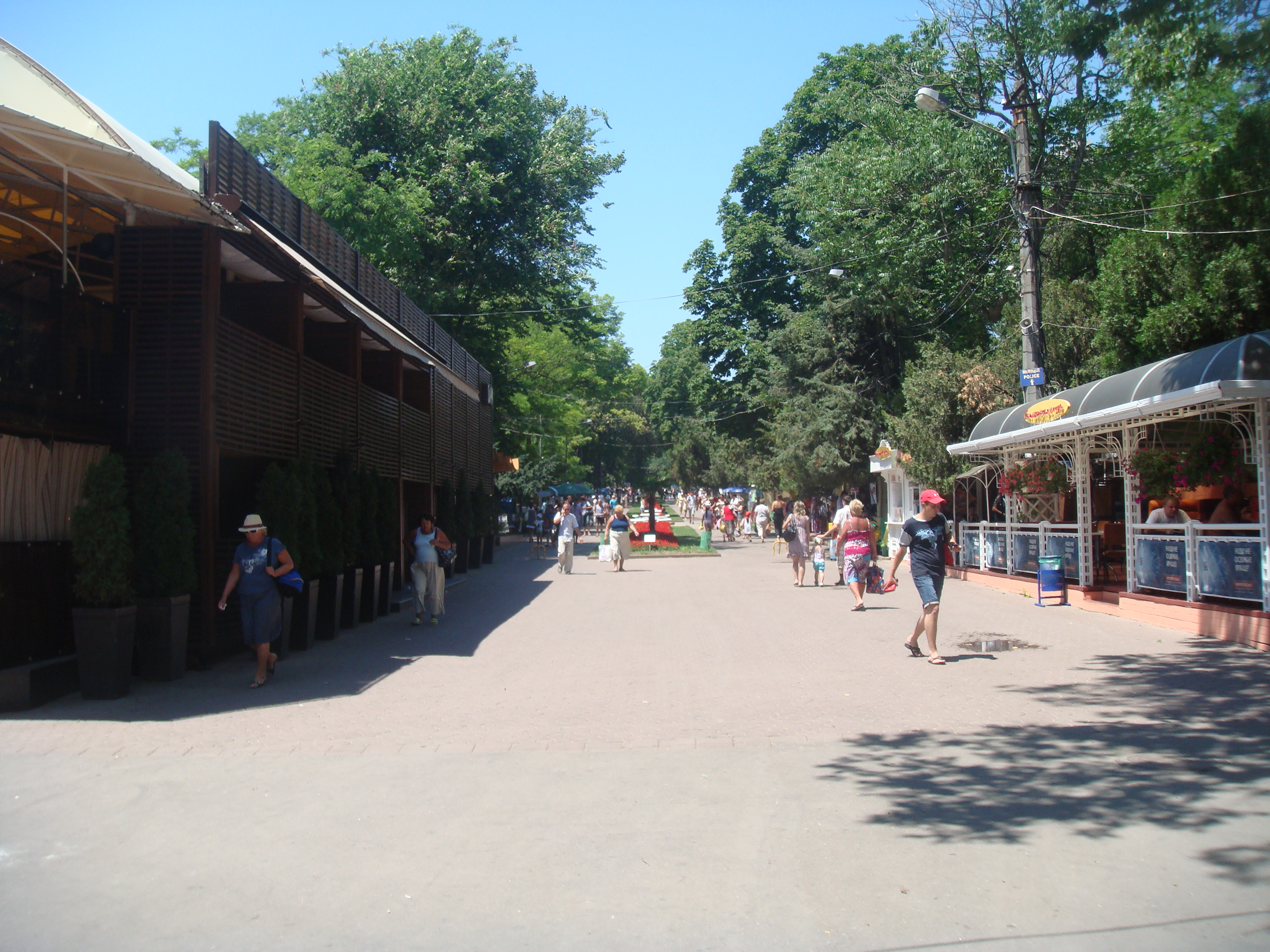
Central avenue of the park

== Sources ==
- Парк Аркадия
- В Аркадии начинают строить новую центральную аллею
- В Аркадии презентовали обновленную аллею: с пальмами и магазинами, но без тени
- Новая Аркадия — долгий путь к морю
