= Yekaterina Gagarina =

Wife of Russian diplomat

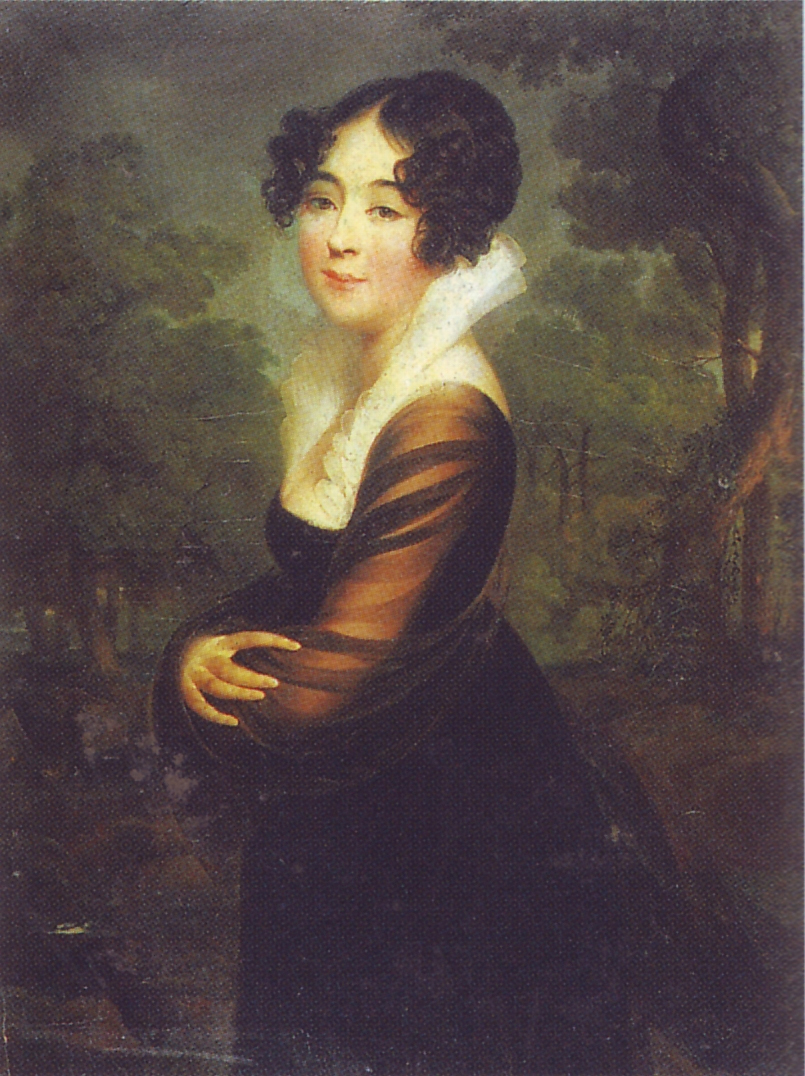
Yekaterina Gagarina, portrait by Barbier from 1809

Yekaterina Petrovna Gagarina (Russian: Екатерина Петровна Гагарина; May 25, 1790 – February 27, 1873), maiden name Soymonova (Соймонова), was a wife of a Russian diplomat Prince Grigory Gagarin and the daughter of the Secretary of State Pyotr Soymonov.

== Biography ==
Ancestors of Yekaterina Gagarina played a significant role in Russian history. Her father, Pyotr Soymonov (1737–1800), was a senator and a full Privy Councillor, and her mother Yekaterina (1756–1790) was a daughter of Gen. Ivan Boltin, a famous historian, a member of the Russian Academy.

Yekaterina's childhood passed among the strife between father and grandmother from her mother side, who wanted to take her granddaughter to his upbringing. The matter went to Catherine the Great, but the Empress did not wish to interfere in the domestic affairs of Pyotr Soymonov. Duties of the court did not hinder Soymonov to devote enough time to his daughter. Yekaterina was brought up in the spirit of his time under the guidance of a French madam Rebyufil. In 1800, after the death of his father, Yekaterina lives with her sister Sophie Swetchine. Her youth passed in St. Petersburg in the house of General Svechin.

Being a wealthy bride, Yekaterina Soymonova in 1809 married Prince Grigory Ivanovich Gagarin (1782–1837). The first years of marriage have been very happy. Yekaterina led a secular lifestyle while her husband's career developed successfully. Already in 1811 he became Secretary of State of the State Council. The family was growing, and in 1810 and 1811 two sons were born.

Her marriage broke up in 1813. The reason for this was the love affair of Grigory Gagarin with a famous beauty Maria Naryshkina. Seriously worried over the break with her husband, Yekaterina tried to find solace in religion. Like her sister Sophie, she converted to Catholicism from his native religion, Russian Orthodoxy.

In 1815, Yekaterina Gagarina reconciled with her husband. After the departure of her sister to Paris, in 1816 she traveled abroad with her husband. Since then, almost constantly, with few interruptions they lived abroad.

In 1822, Prince Gagarin returned to the diplomatic service, holding the post of ambassador in Rome, and in the years 1833-1837 in Munich.

Yekaterina was all the time with her husband, served as a diplomat's wife, hold an open house. Her house was visited by Orest Kiprensky, Karl Bryullov, Vasily Zhukovsky, A. Turgenev, Fyodor Tyutchev. According to contemporaries, Yekaterina Gagarina had high qualities of mind and heart. Zhukovsky, described it in a letter to D.P. Sverbeyev as: "...a very wonderful and lovely woman."

In 1837, Gagarina became a widow. She moved from Munich to Paris to her sister, where Svechin salon was the center of Catholicism. After her sister's death in 1857, Yekaterina returned to Russia.

She died on February 27, 1875 and was buried in Moscow's Vvedensky Cemetery.

== Children ==
Princess Gagarin had five sons:

- Grigory Gagarin (1810–1883) — artist
- Yevgeny (1811–1886) — a state councilor
- Lev (1818–1872)
- Teofil (1820–1853) — one of the most prominent collectors of ancient Russian and Oriental coins, the author of several publications on numismatics.
- Alexander (1827–1895)

== Sources ==
- F. G. Golovkin. Yard and the reign of Paul I. Portraits of memories. -M, 2003, s.289.
- Vol. Nikolai. Russian portraits of the eighteenth and nineteenth centuries, "Volume 3, Issue 2, 1907.
