= Jamie Powe =

English conductor (music)

Personal information
- Full name: James Dominic Powe
- Born: 11 September 1995 (age 31); Hackney, London, England
- Batting: Right-handed
- Role: Wicket-keeper

Domestic team information
- Years: Team
- 2018: Oxford University

Career statistics
Competition	First-class
Matches	1
Runs scored	11
Batting average	11.00
100s/50s	–/–
Top score	11
Catches/stumpings	7/–
- Source: Cricinfo, 29 April 2020

James Dominic Powe (born 11 September 1995) is an English conductor, singer, composer, arranger, and former first-class cricketer.

Powe was born in Hackney in September 1995. He was educated at Highgate School, before going to Somerville College, Oxford where he studied Music. While studying at Oxford, he made an appearance in first-class cricket for Oxford University against Cambridge University in The University Match of 2018 at Oxford. Batting once in the match, he was dismissed in the Oxford first-innings for 11 runs by Thomas Balderson, while in his role as the team wicket-keeper he took seven catches. In July 2017, he took part in the BBC One talent show Pitch Battle with the A cappella group The Oxford Alternotives. In 2018/19, he was one of the Young Conducting Scholars with Sing For Pleasure. He currently holds a scholarship from the Royal Academy of Music, and conducts the Chapel Choir of Regent's Park College, Oxford, the Arcadian Singers, The Aubrey Singers and Putney Choral Society, and has directed The Fourth Choir.
