= Arcadia, Tucumán =

Coordinates: 27°18′S 65°34′W

Arcadia
- Interactive map of Arcadia
- Country: Argentina
- Province: Tucumán

Government
  - Municipal Commissioner: Aída Rosa Alderete
- Elevation: 1,135 ft (346 m)

Population (2001)
  - Total: 1,888
- Time zone: UTC−3 (ART)
- Postal code: 4147
- Area code: 03865

Arcadia (Tucumán) is a settlement (Rural Commune) in Tucumán Province in northern Argentina. Arcadia is in the Chicligasta Department. The jurisdiction of the municipality covers the region between the Gastona and Rio Seco rivers (south and north of the said rivers, responsibility of the municipality of Concepción and the commune of Rio Seco, respectively). Arcadia is located 66 km from the provincial capital of San Miguel de Tucumán and 6 km from Concepción.

== Location ==
Arcadia is located at the intersection of 9 de Julio and Pje. s/n, 200 meters from National Highway 38.

== History ==
Arcadia was the first place in the Republic of Argentina where military service or "colimba" was done in the late nineteenth century, on the actual Gastona river bank, at the height of the red canyon.

== Feasts ==
The patron saint festivities of the Sacred Heart of Jesus is celebrated on last Sunday of July, the celebration is a local outreach programme.
