= Alexander Campkin =

Alexander Campkin (born 26 June 1984) is an English contemporary classical music composer and conductor.

== Biography ==
Alexander Campkin's music is published by Edition Peters. He is Composer-in-Residence of Bournemouth Symphony Orchestra Resound. His piece commissioned by the Bournemouth Symphony Orchestra 'Trembling, hoping, lingering, flying' was performed at the BBC Proms in the Royal Albert Hall in 2018.

Campkin was born in London. He attended Westminster School, and studied viola at the Guildhall School of Music and Drama. He studied music at Oxford University, where he was Choral Scholar at St Catherine's College, Assistant Organ Scholar at Trinity College, conductor of the Oxford Chamber Choir and The Arcadian Singers of Oxford University. He then attended the Royal Academy of Music where he received a master's degree in composition, and the University of Music and Performing Arts, Vienna where he completed a postgraduate diploma in composition.

Campkin is conductor of The Oxbridge Singers and minimaLIST ENsemble and Illumination Chamber Choir

== Composition ==
Alexander Campkin was elected an Associate of the Royal Academy of Music for Services to Composition in 2014. He has received sixty professional commissions and his work has been performed and broadcast in over thirty countries.

Campkin has been commissioned by Birmingham Royal Ballet and Birmingham Cathedral, The Tallis Scholars, the London Mozart Players, ORA Singers, and Voce Chamber choir conducted by Suzi Digby, The Royal Opera House, The Joyful Company of Singers in association with the PRS for Music, The Theatinerkirche Munich (former Choir to the Royal Bavarian Court), The London Festival of Contemporary Church Music, The New London Children's Choir and Ronald Corp, Choir and Organ Magazine, Rhinegold Publishing, Shorter House, Pusey House, Oxford.

His music has been performed in venues including the Berliner Philharmonie, Amsterdam Concertgebouw, Tokyo Opera City Concert Hall, Shakespeare's Globe Sam Wanamaker Playhouse, Grace Cathedral San Francisco, L'Oratoire de Louvre Paris, Tongyeong Concert Hall South Korea, Christ Cathedral California, LSO St Luke's, Muziekgebouw Amsterdam, Westminster Abbey, National Concert Hall Dublin, King's Place London, St Martin-in-the-Fields London, Cathedral of Saint John the Divine New York City, Southbank Centre and the Barbican Centre.

Alexander Campkin was shortlisted in the British Composer Awards in 2008 and 2011 and is emeritus Composer of the Fulham Camerata, Resident Composer of The Fourth Choir and Composer in Residence of Ampersandance Contemporary Dance Company

== Recordings ==
- 2010 – Sleep, Holy Babe by Blossom Street (Naxos)
- 2010 – Calm Me, O Lord by the Wooburn Singers
- 2012 – In Lumine Tuo by the Trinity Singers
- 2013 – Sent from God by the Merbecke Choir (The Shadow of Thy Wings, sfz music: SFZM0313)
- 2013 – Down by the Sea by Blossom Street (Naxos). Classic FM Conoisseur's Choice with David Mellor: 'Simply lovely. I cannot recommend this disc too highly.'.
- 2013 – I saw Eternity by the Oxbridge Singers
- 2013 – Counting my Numberless Fingers by the Minimalist Ensemble
- 2013 – Bright Shadows by Concanenda (Footprint Records)
- 2014 – Colour Blinds the Eye by Serikon (Footprint Records) 'Harmonies grow in layers at certain moments, but the emphasis is on a beauty of horizontal lines which join and occasionally clash with delicious dissonance.'
- 2016 - NMC/London Sinfonietta: CoMA Open Score
- 2017 - Message in a Teardrop by Cantus Ensemble
- 2018 - Sent from God by The Chamber Choir of London conducted by Dominic Peckham
- 2019 - Sleep, holy Babe by Signum Classics
- 2021 - CAMPKIN, A.: Choral Works - True Light / Missa Brevis / The First Kiss, by vOx chamber choir, Spinks, T. Fry and D. Crown.
