= Simmonds Islands =

Island group in New Zealand

Coordinates: 34.75563°S 173.15620°E

Location of the Simmonds Islands in New Zealand

The Simmonds Islands are a small group of uninhabited islands in the Far North District of the Northland Region of New Zealand. The islands lie about 1 km north of Granville Point, at the southern end of Henderson Bay. The group consists of two main islands - "Motu Puruhi" (west) and "Terakautuhaka Island" (east) - in close proximity, plus a few sea stacks.

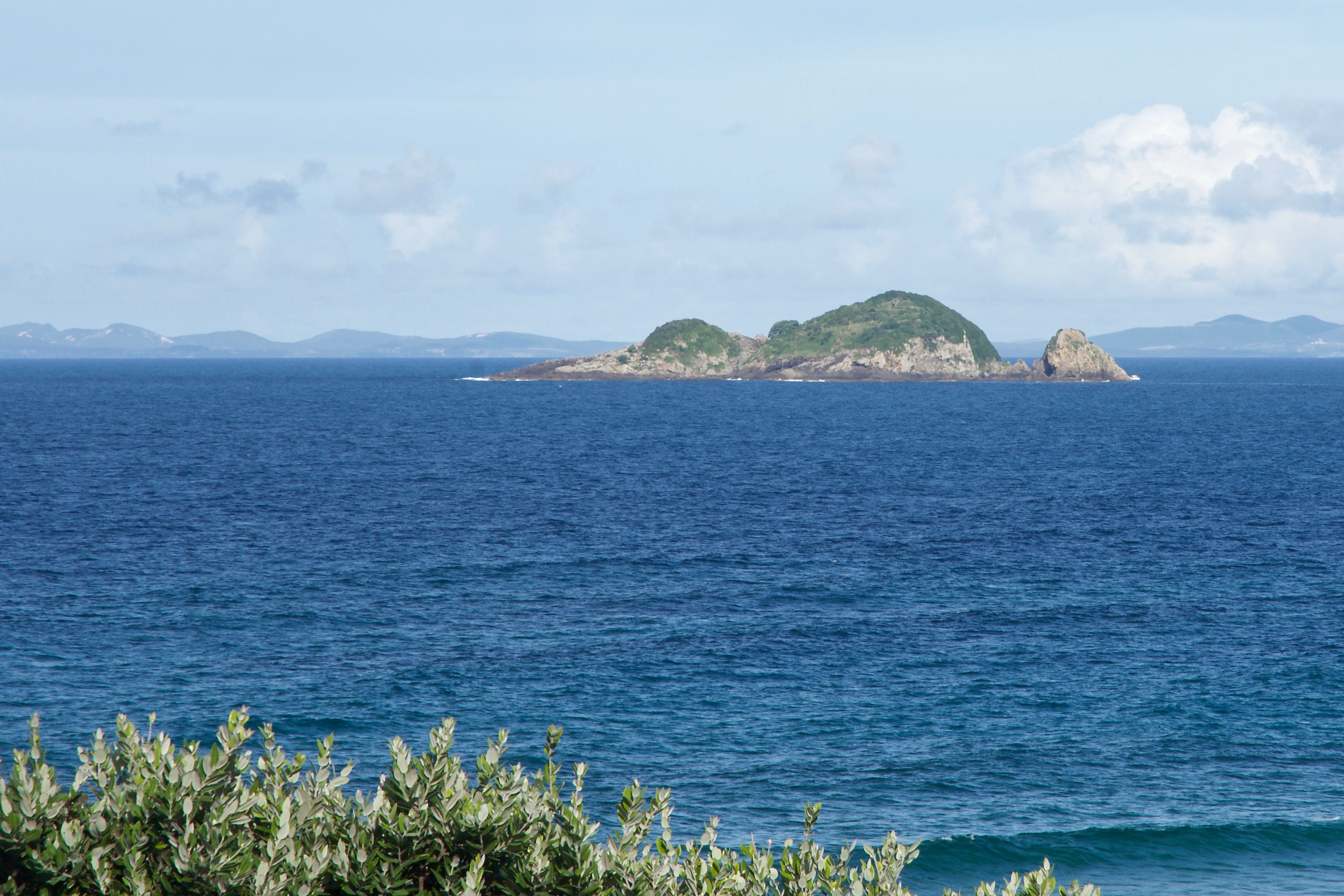
A view of Simmonds Islands from nearby Henderson Bay

== Flora, fauna, and geology ==
The islands are managed as a reserve by the Department of Conservation, and is a 'no landing zone'. The islands are home to a variety of sea and shore birds, including the Buller's shearwater which, until discovered breeding here in 1990, was thought to breed only on the Poor Knights Islands. Numerous shore skinks can also be found on the islands.

A 1966 research paper described the islands (and their flora and fauna) in detail. At this time the western and eastern main islands were named "Rat Islet" and "Kowhai Islet", respectively. The paper noted that they are separated only by a "boulder beach", and described the "Anapuhipuhi Blowhole" - to the south-east of the easternmost main islet (now named "Terakautuhaka Island") as "produc(ing) a spray rising 40 to 45 feet" (12 to 14m).

A subsequent research paper in 1968 described a geological survey of the islands, noting that the islands consist mostly of argillite and basalt.

== See also ==
- List of islands of New Zealand
- List of islands
- Desert island
