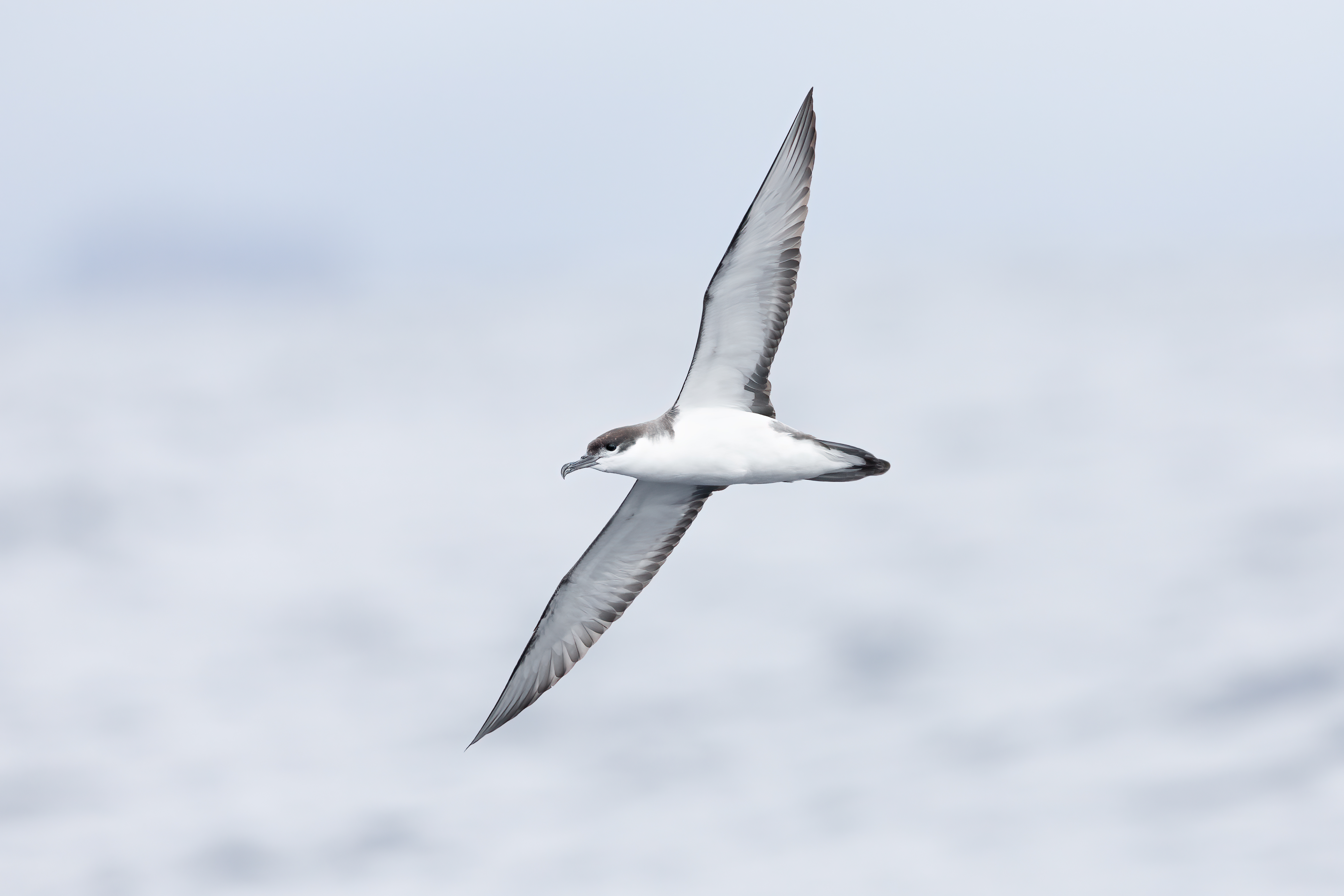

Conservation status
- Vulnerable (IUCN 3.1)

Scientific classification
- Kingdom: Animalia
- Phylum: Chordata
- Class: Aves
- Order: Procellariiformes
- Family: Procellariidae
- Genus: Ardenna
- Species: A. bulleri

Binomial name
- Ardenna bulleri (Salvin, 1888)

= Buller's shearwater =

Species of bird

Buller's shearwater (Ardenna bulleri) is a Pacific species of seabird in the family Procellariidae; it is also known as the grey-backed shearwater or New Zealand shearwater. A member of the black-billed wedge-tailed Thyellodroma group, among the larger shearwaters of the genus Ardenna, it forms a superspecies with the wedge-tailed shearwater (A. pacificus).

== Description ==
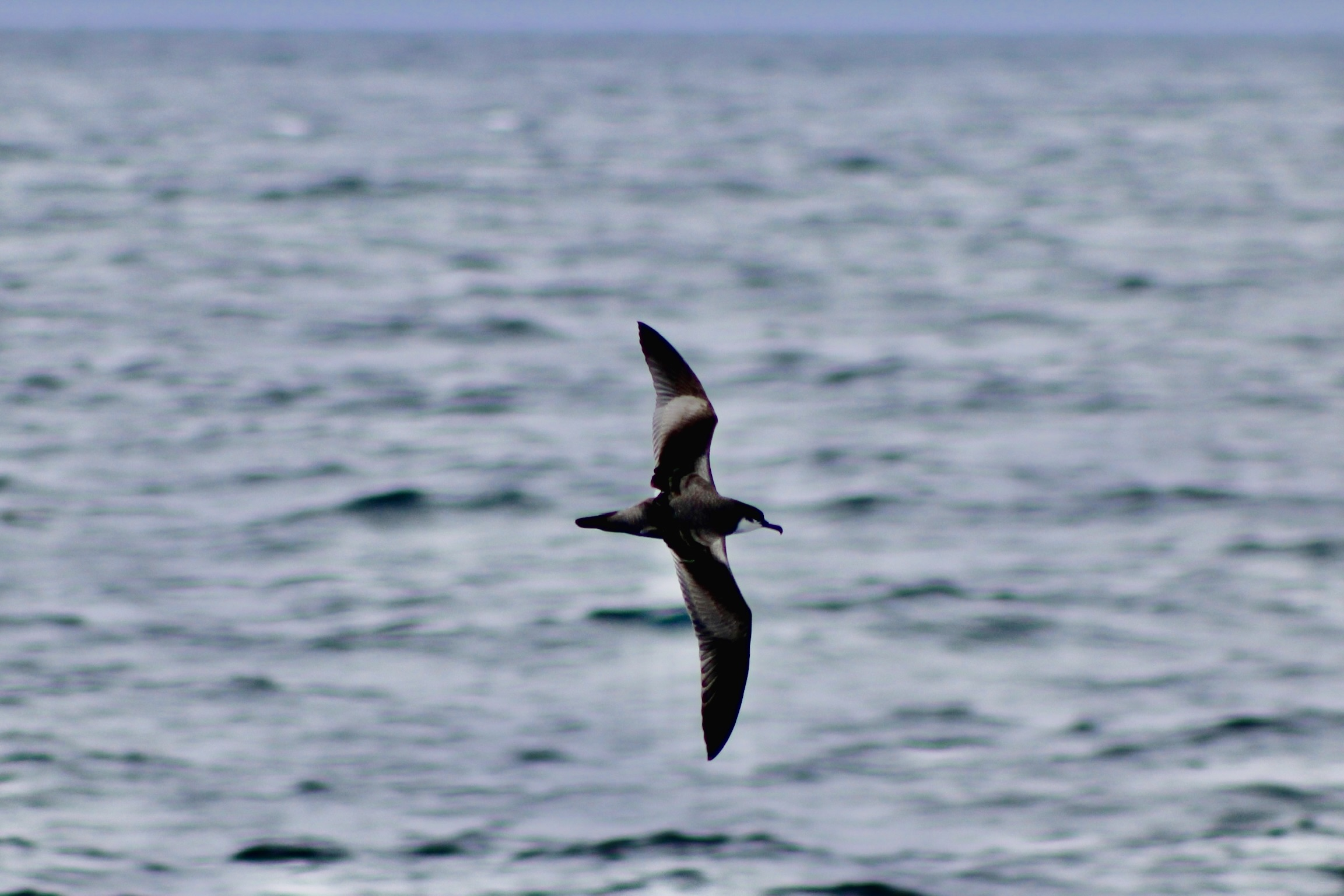
Buller's shearwater in Leigh, New Zealand; note upperwing pattern

Adults birds are 46–47 cm (18–19 in) in length, with a 97–99 cm (38–39 in) wingspan, and have been recorded to weigh 342–425 g (12.1–15.0 oz). The upperside of Buller's shearwater is bluish grey. A blackish stripe runs from the tertiary remiges to the primary wing coverts. The primary remiges are blackish, also; the two black areas do not meet at the hand, however; the area between them is a rather light grey, and under bright light may appear almost white. With the bird facing upwards, the pattern gives the impression of a broken black "M", with light grey interspersing areas.

The underside is bright white; on the head the upperside's grey extends town to eye height and the white cheeks may shine up conspicuously, as in the smaller shearwaters of Puffinus sensu stricto. The rectrices are blackish and the tail is wedge-shaped; the bill and irises are dark. Fledged juveniles already have the adult's colouration; the nestlings are covered in grey down feathers.

Compared to other shearwaters, the species is unusually easy to identify at sea by its combination of considerable size and the distinctive, M-shaped banding pattern on its upperside while flying, uniquely among its genus and more akin to some gadfly petrels (Pterodroma), the prions (Pachyptila) and their relative, the blue petrel (Halobaena caerulea). These are all much smaller birds, perhaps two-thirds in length and wingspan and less than half in bulk of Buller's shearwater.

== Range and ecology ==
This species is pelagic like the other Ardenna shearwaters; it is a transequatorial migrant ranging across most of the Pacific Ocean outside the breeding season. Though it occurs in the subarctic waters off Kamchatka and the Aleutian Islands, it is not documented in the subantarctic Pacific; this apparent absence might simply be due to the lack of study opportunities in the vast islandless region south of the Polynesian Triangle, however. It is fairly common well off the west coast of the United States during late summer and early autumn, and can generally be observed not far from land along the whole temperate and tropical coastlines of the Americas. Its general absence from most of Melanesia and western Micronesia – where human settlement and sea traffic are considerable – is thus probably genuine; only isolated records, such as from the Marianas, Palau, and Yap, exist from west and southwest of the Marshall Islands. A vagrant bird was also recorded in the Atlantic once, offshore New Jersey, United States.

Buller's shearwater feeds mainly on fish, squid, and crustaceans such as the krill Nyctiphanes australis. It does occasionally follow ships, such as fishing trawlers, and may be part of a mixed-species feeding flock. Food is caught mainly at a head's length below the surface at most, the bird either picking it up with the bill only, often out of flight, or briefly inserting the entire head, usually while swimming. It neither dives out of flight very often, nor in a plunge off the water's surface.

It is a colonial nester, breeding predominantly on Tawhiti Rahi and Aorangi, the main islands of the Poor Knights group offshore northern New Zealand. This bird nests in burrows, rock crevices, or under tree roots, preferring densely forested slopes. Buller's shearwater can also be found to breed in cracked-up rock on treeless stacks or cliffs, however, and most of the other colonies – on the smaller Poor Knights islands between the main islands and off the southeast of Aorangi – are of such a nature. A pair was observed to breed on the Simmonds Islands in 1980, but this seems to have been an isolated incident.

The breeding season starts in October and lasts for almost half a year. A single egg is incubated for about 51 days, with the parents changing between incubation and feeding every 4 days or so. Time to fledging is not well known, but by analogy with Buller's shearwater's relatives assumed to be around 100 days.

In the past, it was heavily used as a food source by the Māori, and on Aorangi it suffered massive predation by feral pigs. Its population had crashed to a low of just 100-200 pairs on Aorangi in the late 1930s. The pigs were removed from the island in 1936, and the shearwater population recovered, numbering 200,000 pairs again in the early 1980s to approach carrying capacity on the island at the end of the 20th century. At all times, however, the colonies at Tawhiti Rahi and on the smaller islets could supply birds for the resettlement of Aorangi, and Buller's shearwater was never considered threatened with extinction in the foreseeable future. Indeed, it is a very abundant bird, with an estimated world population of 2.5 million birds. As it is not known to occur on any larger island in the region outside the Poor Knights Islands, it is classified as vulnerable by the IUCN: a single localized catastrophe could wipe the species out.

== See also ==
- Seabird colony
