= The Arcadians =

The Arcadians may refer to:

- The Arcadians (musical), an Edwardian musical first produced in 1909, with music by Lionel Monckton and Howard Talbot
- The Arcadians (film), a 1927 silent film based on the musical
- The Arcadian Singers, a choir based in Oxford, England
- Employees of engineering company Arcadis often call themselves Arcadians
