= Concordia (steamboat) =

1930 steamboat used on Puget Sound

- above : Concordia chartered for news carriers picnic 8/2/36. below : Concordia aground somewhere in Puget Sound.

History
- Name: Concordia
- Completed: 1930, at Tacoma
- Identification: US registry 230279

General characteristics
- Type: Inland steamboat
- Length: 62.5 ft (19.05 m)
- Installed power: steam engine, later diesel

Concordia was a steamboat that ran on Puget Sound from 1930 to 1976. Although later converted to diesel power, Concordia was the last inland commercial steamboat ever built on either Puget Sound or the Columbia river.

== Career ==
Concordia was built in 1930 at Tacoma, Washington.

Concordia, popularly called the Conkie, was the last steamboat built on either Puget Sound or the Columbia, and was one of only four steamboats constructed on Puget Sound after 1920. (None were built on the Columbia River). The others built on Puget Sound were Virginia V, Sightseer (ex-Vashona), and Arcadia.

Concordia was built by the Vashon Navigation Company to replace the larger Vashona. The volume of business on the company's major route, from Tacoma to Quartermaster Harbor, had fallen off, and would not support the larger vessel. Originally Concordia was to be 62.5 feet (19.05 m), but John Manson, the company president, discovered that if the vessel were less than 65, the maritime regulations would permit the vessel to be operated with one less crewman. Four feet of hull were then omitted from the final design on the stern end, which gave the completed vessel a truncated or lopped-off appearance. Vashona was then sold to the Anderson Steamboat Company.

== Operations ==
Concordia was placed on the Tacoma-Quartermaster Harbor route. One of Concordia's commanders on the Tacoma-Quartermaster Harbor run was the well-known and popular Thomas W. "Billy" Phillips (1877–1949).

On August 2, 1936, the Tacoma Times newspaper chartered Concordia for the annual picnic of its 300 young newspaper carriers at Redondo Beach, Washington. This was part of a regular practice of the Tacoma Times of sponsoring events for their carriers.

In 1937 the vessel was refitted with a 90-horsepower diesel engine. In 1942, Concordia passed into the hands of Joe Boies and Irving Frank, doing business as Harbor Island Ferries. They then placed Concordia in service transporting shipyard workers across Elliott Bay from downtown Seattle.

In 1958 Concordia was operated by Horluck Transportation Company as part of their commuter and tourist fleet operating out of Bremerton and Port Orchard, Washington.

== Deposition ==
In 1976, the Concordia was acquired by Andre Nowaczyk and brought to Lake Union from Poulsbo. Nowaczyk and his wife Beverly restored and maintained the Concordia and moored on Lake Union at the foot of Stone Way Ave N until 2020. In October of 2020 "Concordia" was renovated by South Puget Sound natives Al Pollan and Bart Brynestad and moored in front of Anthony's Seafood in Gig Harbor, Washington, nearby its original route between Tacoma and South Vashon.
