= Acadian House =

Acadian House may refer to:

== In Canada ==
- Acadian House Museum, West Chezzetcook, Nova Scotia

== In the United States ==
- Acadian House (Guilford, Connecticut), listed on the U.S. National Register of Historic Places (NRHP)
- Acadian House (St. Martinville, Louisiana), a U.S. National Historic Landmark
- Acadia Plantation, former historic home in Thibodaux, Lafourche Parish, Louisiana, demolished in 2010

== See also ==
- Acadia Ranch, Oracle, Arizona, listed on the NRHP in Pinal County, Arizona
- Acadian Historic Buildings, Van Buren, Maine, listed on the NRHP in Aroostook County, Maine
- Acadian Landing Site, Madawaska, Maine, listed on the NRHP in Aroostook County, Maine
- Acadian (disambiguation)
