= Arcadia (Odesa) =

Area of Odesa, Ukraine

Coordinates: 46°25′30″N 30°45′46″E

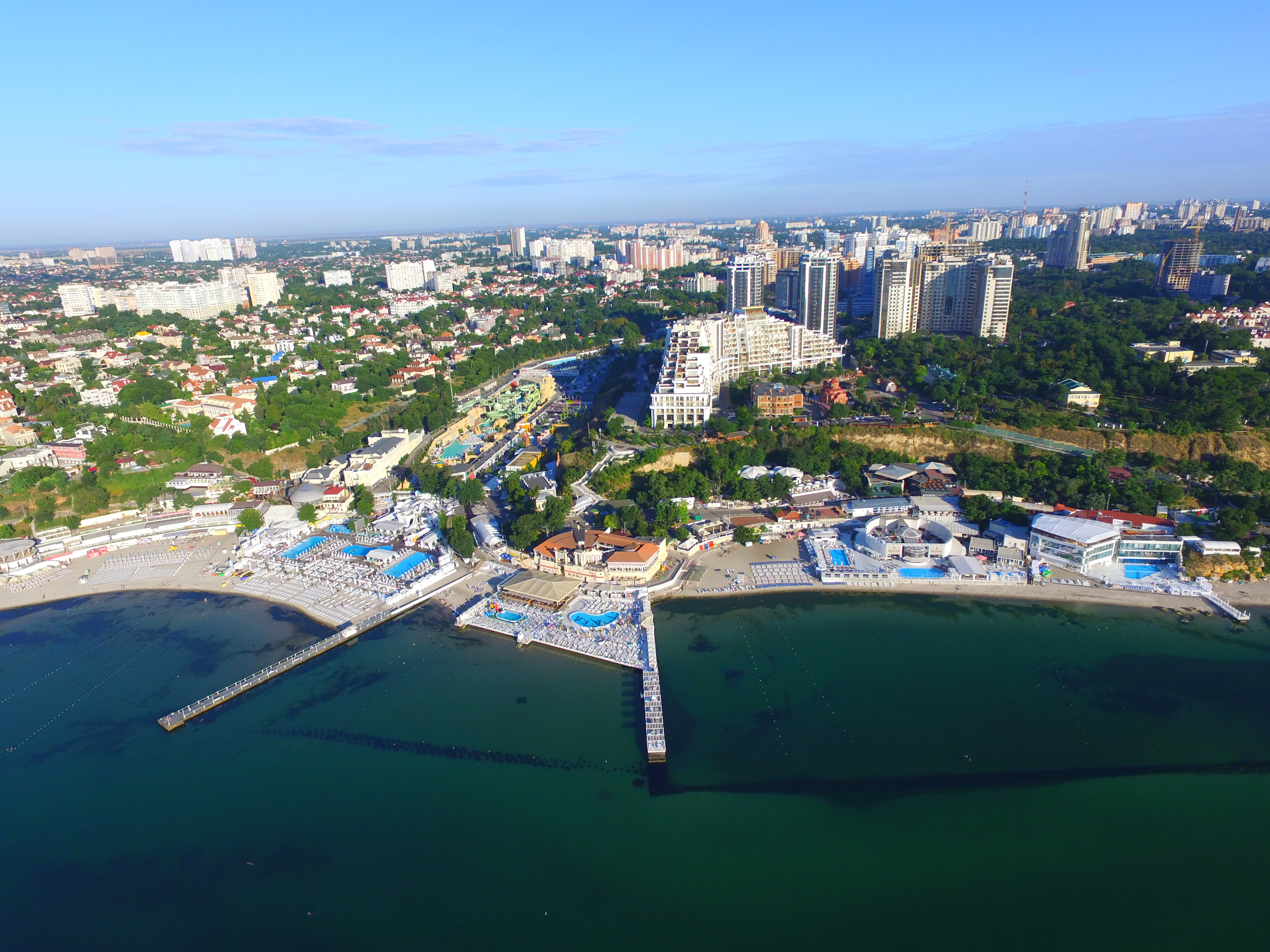
Aerial view of Arcadia

Arcadia (Ukrainian: Аркадія, romanized: Arkadiia) is a historical part of Odesa, Ukraine, which is known as a famous resort. It is located in the coastal part of the city, close to the quarters of 5th and 7th stations of Velyky Fontan. The quarter was named after a mountainous district in Greece, which was known as the home of pastoral villagers.

The famous Arcadia Beach and Arcadia Park are located in the district. The modern concept of Arcadia is a restaurant and entertainment complex with elements of a shopping center.

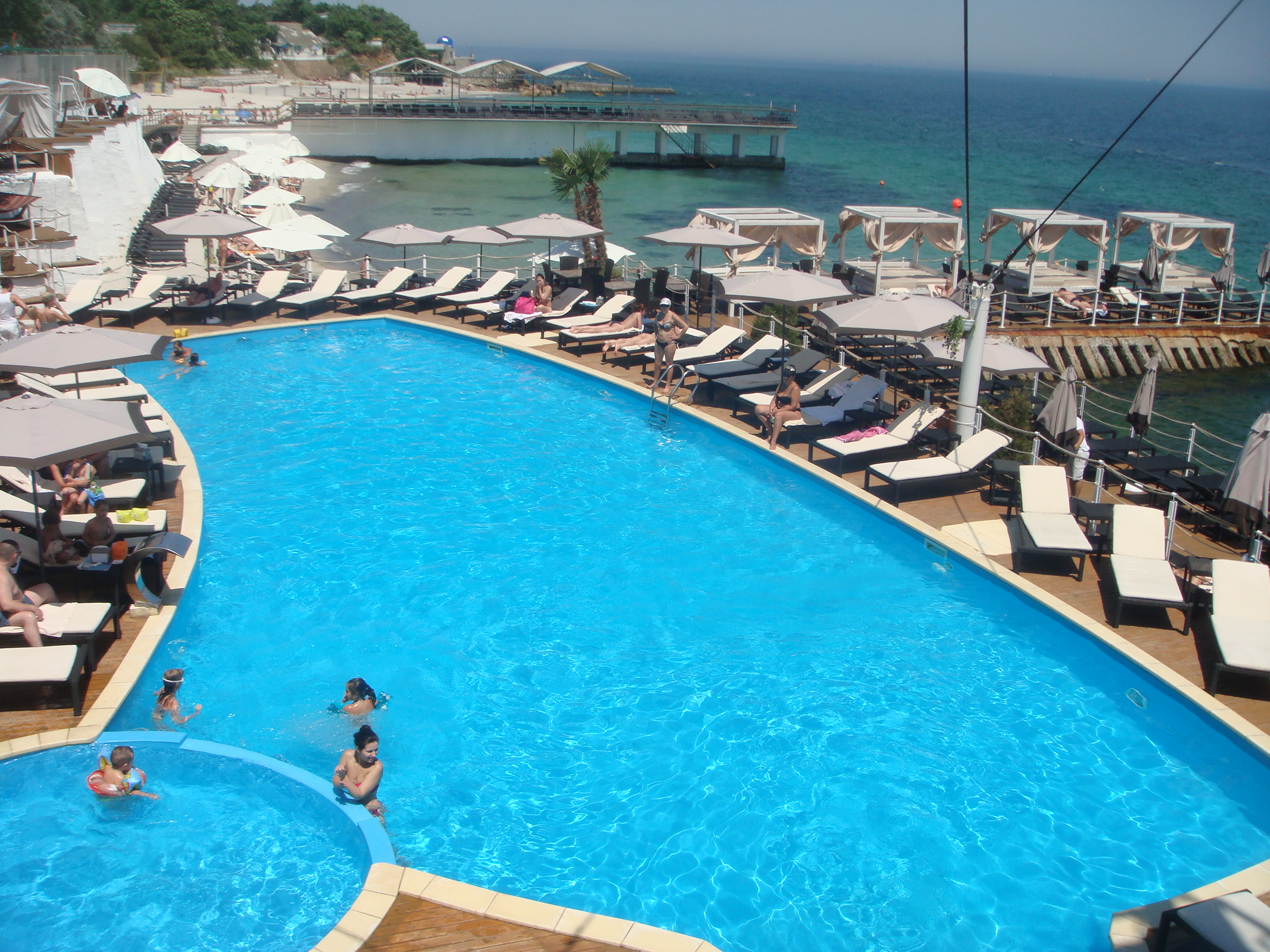
Beaches of Arcadia

== History ==
Prior to the end of the 18th century, the area was the location of the Wittgenstein family farm. Afterwards, the farm was bought by the Decemberist general Sergei Volkonsky, which was when the development of a settlement in the area began. The area became heavily populated with estates and summer cottages owned by the Russian aristocrats, and was then eventually purchased by Yekaterina Gagarina. However, many parts of central Arcadia were still underdeveloped with the historian A.M. Deribas writing that one could only find the shack of a poor Greek fisherman.

The development of Arcadia as a resort area began in 1894 with the construction of a horse-drawn tram through the settlement, and the opening of the resort within the area was finished on 1 July 1895. This was all sponsored by the Belgian Emile Cambier, who was at the time the director of the Odesa agency of the Belgian equestrian railways. Following the 1917 Russian Revolution, the former cottages and estates went to sanatoriums, where many Soviet workers from different republics came. Over the next few decades, an electric tram was also added to the area alongside the creation of Arcadia Park, which led to the removal of the tram lines, and a new road was built. In the 1960s, protections were put in place on the shores of Arcadia. In 1985, the April 10 Square was founded in the district, alongside a monument called "Wings of Victory" in the middle of the district.

In 2013, the Odesa City Council approved a project to reconstruct part of the downtown area called Arcadia Alley, and construction began that same year. During the reconstruction, multiple structures within the district park were demolished, including the fountains and numerous restaurants. The renovated alley reopened to visitors in May 2014 to mixed reactions. In 2016, Dox's dacha, a historic seaside mansion in Arcadia, which was built as a private summer estate by Herman Karlovich Schevrembrandt (who helped with the construction of the Palais-Royal), was also demolished despite an order from the Odesa regional administration to preserve it.

== Sources ==
- Саркисьян К. С., Ставницер М. Ф. Улицы рассказывают / Художник В. А. Новорусский. — Изд. 3-е, перераб. и доп. — Одесса: Маяк, 1972. — С. 62 - 65.
