= Acadian (disambiguation) =

An Acadian is a native of Acadia, a region of northeastern North America.

Acadian may also refer to:

- Acadian (train), a Southern Pacific passenger train
- Acadian (automobile), a make of automobile produced by General Motors of Canada
- Pontiac Acadian, a subcompact car sold in Canada as a rebadged Chevrolet Chevette
- Acadian French, a French dialect
- Acadian flycatcher, a small insect-eating bird
- Acadian orogeny, a middle Paleozoic deformation in geology
- Acadian Peninsula, a peninsula in North America
- Acadian World Congress, a festival held every five years
- List of Acadians, notable people of Acadian origin
  - Acadian Coast, historical term for the area along the Mississippi River settled by Acadians in the 18th century

== See also ==
- Akkadian (disambiguation)
- Acadia (disambiguation)
- Acadian House (disambiguation)
- Acadiana, a large region of south Louisiana that is home to the Cajun branch of Acadian culture
