= Arcadia Township, Iron County, Missouri =

Township in Iron County, Missouri, U.S.

Coordinates: 37.5744°N 90.6603°W

ArcadiaTownship is an inactive township in Iron County, in the U.S. state of Missouri.

Arcadia Township was established in 1857, taking its name from nearby Arcadia Valley.
