= Arcadia High School =

Arcadia High School may refer to:

- Arcadia High School (Arizona)
- Arcadia High School (California)
- Arcadia High School (Louisiana)
- Arcadia Charter School, a school in Northfield, Minnesota
- Arcadia High School (Nebraska), in Arcadia, Nebraska
- Arcadia High School (New York)
- Arcadia High School (Ohio)
- Arcadia High School (Virginia)
- Arcadia High School (Wisconsin), in Arcadia, Wisconsin
