= Nicolas Alexandre Barbier =

French painter

Nicolas Alexandre Barbier (1789–1864) was a French landscape painter. Born in Paris, he initially painted architectural subjects, but later became part of the realistic school of landscape painting, and exhibited a large number of works at the Paris Salons between 1824 and 1861. He died at Sceaux in 1864.
