= Arcadia Township =

Arcadia Township may refer to:

- Arcadia Township, Carroll County, Iowa
- Arcadia Township, Kalamazoo County, Michigan, now Kalamazoo Township
- Arcadia Township, Lapeer County, Michigan
- Arcadia Township, Manistee County, Michigan
- Arcadia Township, Iron County, Missouri
- Arcadia Township, Valley County, Nebraska
- Arcadia Township, Davidson County, North Carolina, in Davidson County, North Carolina
