= Arcadian =

Arcadian may refer to:

- Arcadian, someone or something from, or related to:
  - Arcadia (region), the ancient Greek region
  - Arcadia (regional unit), the region in modern Greece
  - Accademia degli Arcadi, the Italian literary academy founded in Rome
  - any of the other places known as "Arcadia"
- Arcadian Greek, the dialect spoken in ancient Arcadia
- Arcadian ecology, an environmentalist perspective
- Bebearia arcadius, a butterfly in the family Nymphalidae

== Arts and entertainment ==
- Arcadian (Star Trek), a race in Star Trek
- The Arcadian, a 2011 American science fiction film
- Arcadian (film), a 2024 American post-apocalyptic horror film starring Nicolas Cage
- Arcadian (band), a Franco-Swiss band
- The Arcadian (novel), a 2026 novel by Steven Pressfield, the sequel to his previous novel A Man at Arms (novel).

== Ships ==
- SS Arcadian, formerly the 1899 ship, SS Ortona, she was torpedoed and sunk in 1917
- RMSP Asturias (1907), renamed RMSP Arcadian in 1923 and scrapped in 1933
- HMS Arcadian, a projected Amphion-class submarine, the order for which was cancelled in 1945

== See also ==
- Arcadia (disambiguation)
- Arcadians (disambiguation)
- Acadian, Cajun
