= Arcadia Productions =

Italian theatre company

Arcadia Productions is the largest English-speaking theatre company in Italy. The company was formed as 'La Nuova Arcadia' in 1991, and changed its name and legal status in 2000, becoming Arcadia Productions s.a.s. Arcadia is co-directed by Graham Spicer and Carlo Orlandi. The majority of the company's work is for schools, which form 97% of its public. Arcadia is part of the Teatro per Ragazzi (Children's Theatre) network in the province of Lombardy. Arcadia currently has 9 productions in its repertoire, and adds a new production at the beginning most seasons.

The company's offices are in Milan, where the premières of all new productions take place, and where the company is in residence for 10 weeks each season. Though primarily a touring company, Arcadia has two bases in Milan: the Teatro San Carlo (490 seats) opposite Santa Maria delle Grazie which houses Leonardo da Vinci's The Last Supper; and Teatro La Creta (400 seats) on the western outskirts of the city. The touring schedule takes Arcadia to most of the important cities and theatres in the north and central parts of Italy: Turin, Bergamo, Brescia, Verona, Vicenza, Padua, Udine, Pordenone, Florence, Bologna, Imperia, Rome, Lecco, Monza and Novara. Historic theatres included in the season are the in Novara, the Teatro Ponchielli in Cremona, and the Teatro Fraschini in Pavia.

== Arcadia's repertory ==
All productions are written by Graham Spicer and designed by Carlo Orlandi.

- 2011 I Love London (new version)
- 2008 Robbie the Robot
- 2007 The Great Britain Show
- 2006 William and the Sea People
- 2005 The Time Machine
- 2003 The Shakespeare Show
- 2001 Storybook
- 2000 Frankenstein
- 1999 William the Conqueror
- 1998 Shakespeare & Co.
- 1996 I Love London
- 1994 Stepping Out
- 1992 Tea For Two
