= Cromwell, Washington =

Unincorporated community in Washington, US

Cromwell
- Unincorporated community
- Location within the state of Washington
- Coordinates: 47°16′27″N 122°37′20″W
- Country: United States
- State: Washington
- County: Pierce
- Elevation: 66 ft (20 m)
- Time zone: UTC-8 (Pacific (PST))
  - Summer (DST): UTC-7 (PDT)
- GNIS feature ID: 1510900

Cromwell is an unincorporated community in Pierce County, in the U.S. state of Washington.

== History ==
A post office called Cromwell was established in 1903, and remained in operation until 1931. The community was named after J. B. Cromwell, a postal official.
