= Akkadian =

Akkadian or Accadian may refer to:

- Akkadians, inhabitants of the Akkadian Empire
- Akkadian language, an extinct Eastern Semitic language
- Akkadian literature, literature in this language
- Akkadian cuneiform, early writing system
- Akkadian mythology, early Mesopotamian religion

== See also ==
- Acadian (disambiguation)
- Akadia (disambiguation)
- Akkad (disambiguation)
