= Akadia, Gujarat =

Village in Gujarat state, India

Akadia or Ankadia is a village and former Rajput petty princely state on Saurashtra peninsula.

== Village ==
Akadia (or Ankadia) lies in Amreli Taluka of Amreli district in Gujarat, western India. It is situated about twenty miles north-east of Babra, and about four miles north of Bhadli, on the northern bank of the Keri river.

== History ==
The princely state, in Gohelwar prant, was ruled by Chavda Rajput Chieftains. During the British Raj, it was in the charge of the colonial Eastern Kathiawar Agency.

It comprised only the single village, with a population of 102 in 1901, yielding 1,250 Rupees state revenue (1903–04, all from land), paying 154 Rupees tribute to the British and Junagadh State.

It was a separate tribute paying state under the Babra thana during British period. The ruling Garasias were Chavda Rajputs and this was the only independent Chavda holding in Saurashtra.

== External links and Sources ==
- Imperial Gazetteer, on DSAL.UChicago.edu - Kathiawar

This article incorporates text from a publication now in the public domain: Gazetteer of the Bombay Presidency: Kathiawar. Vol. VIII. Printed at the Government Central Press, Bombay. 1884. p. 356.
