= Acadie Siding, New Brunswick =

Acadie Siding
- Location of Acadie Siding in New Brunswick
- Coordinates: 46.684444°N 65.386667°W
- Country: Canada
- Province: New Brunswick
- County: Kent County
- Lowest elevation: 0 m (0 ft)
- Time zone: UTC-4 (Atlantic (AST))
  - Summer (DST): UTC-3 (ADT)
- Area code: 506
- NTS Map: 21I10 Richibucto

Acadie Siding is a Canadian unincorporated community located in Kent County, New Brunswick. The community is in southeastern New Brunswick, near Nouvelle-Arcadie. Acadie Siding is centered around the intersection of Route 126 and Route 480. Acadie Siding is a predominantly Acadian community.

The name was also used for an area with reduced services within the former local service district of the parish of Acadieville.

== Bordering communities ==
- Nouvelle-Arcadie, New Brunswick
- Noinville, New Brunswick
- Pineau, New Brunswick

== See also ==
- List of communities in New Brunswick
