= Arcadia (house) =

Historic house in Maryland

- U.S. National Register of Historic Places
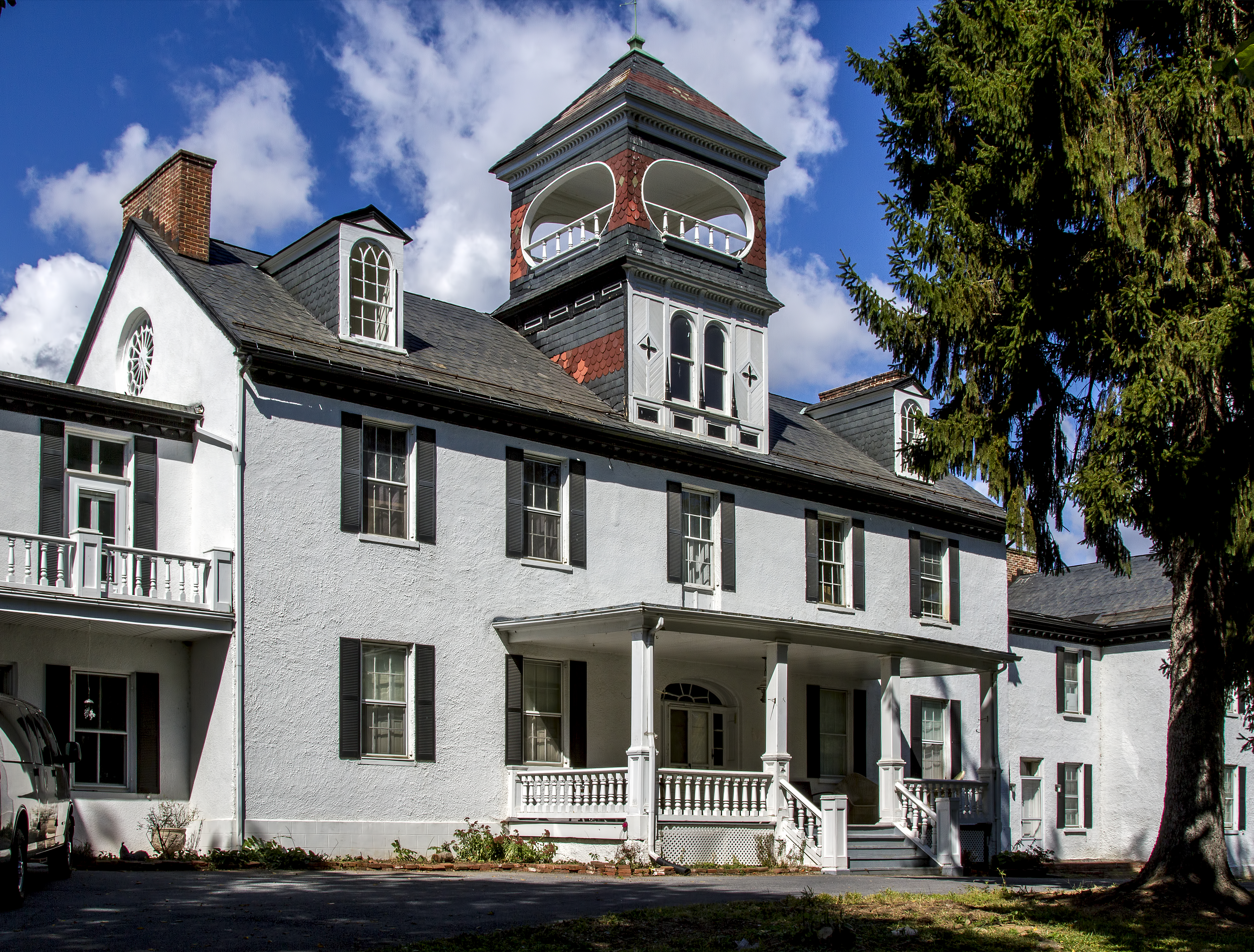

- Location within Maryland Location within the United States
- Location: 4720 Buckeystown Pike (MD 85), Frederick, Maryland
- Coordinates: 39°21′51″N 77°25′8″W
- Area: 12 acres (4.9 ha)
- Built: 1780
- NRHP reference No.: 78001458
- Added to NRHP: August 3, 1978

Arcadia is a historic house located between Frederick and Buckeystown, Maryland. Erected about 1790, the house overlooks Monocacy National Battlefield. The house was extensively altered in the late 19th century and now possesses an elaborate balconied tower. The interior was also extensively updated at that time.

The house played a role in the Civil War when in the days prior to the Battle of Antietam Confederate Colonel (later General) William Pendleton stayed at Arcadia. It later became General George Meade's headquarters in the time leading up to the Battle of Gettysburg. During the Battle of Monocacy General Jubal Early formed his troops at Arcadia.

Arcadia was listed on the National Register of Historic Places in 1978.
