= Henderson Bay =

Bay on the Aupouri Peninsula in New Zealand

Coordinates: 34.7557°S 173.1307°E

Henderson Bay is a bay on the Aupouri Peninsula, near the very top of the North Island in New Zealand. It is on the eastern side of the peninsula next to the Pacific Ocean and 7 kilometres (4.3 mi) off New Zealand State Highway 1, 66 km (41 mi) south of Cape Reinga and 10 km (6.2 mi) north of Houhora. A gravel road connects the bay to the highway. The closest passenger airport to Henderson Bay is Kaitaia Airport, approximately 37 kilometres (23 mi) away.

Demographics for the area are included at Ngataki.

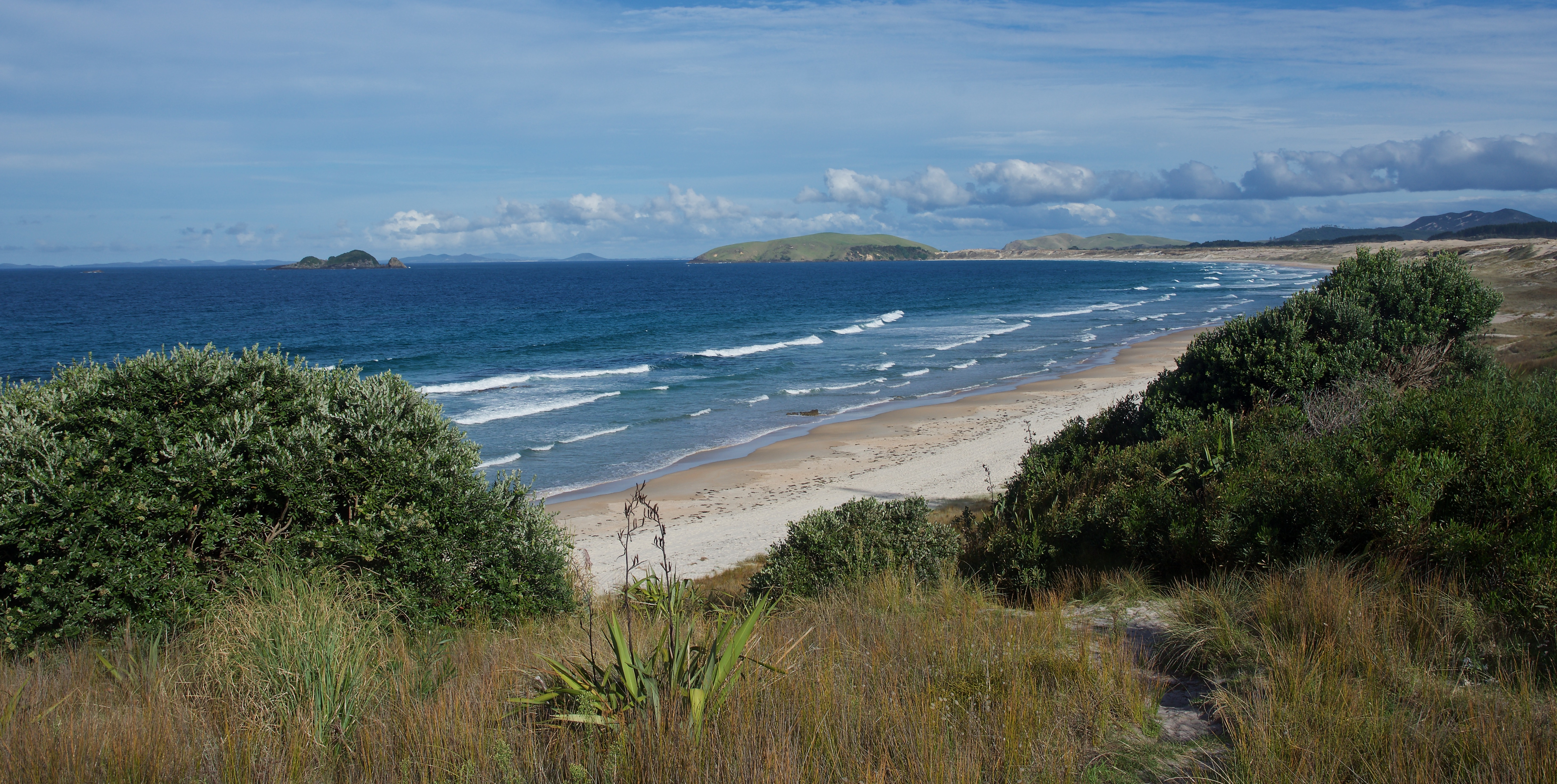
Looking south across Henderson Bay. (The Simmonds Islands are visible on the far left.)

== Recreation ==
Henderson Bay is popular for surfing. It is an exposed beach and reef break with consistent surf; most of the surf comes from groundswells, with the ideal swell angle from the northeast. The beach break offers both left and right hand waves, and the reef also has left and right hand breaks. Submerged rocks are a hazard.

== History ==
There is evidence that New Zealand's biggest tsunami took place at Henderson Bay between 1450 and 1480 AD, leaving deposits some 32 metres (105 ft) above sea level and extending about 1,000 metres (3,300 ft) inland.

This assessment was made by NIWA scientist Darren King, drawing on the New Zealand Palaeotsunami Database, which was established to consolidate scientific records of tsunamis that occurred before written records existed.
