= Arcadia (magazine) =

- Front cover of issue 78 of Arcadia featuring cast members of Les Ballets Trockadero de Monte Carlo.
- Editor-in-Chief: Marianne Ponsford
- Categories: Arts, film
- Frequency: Monthly
- First issue: 9 October 2005
- Company: Publicaciones Semana S.A.
- Country: Colombia
- Based in: Bogotá, D.C.
- Language: Spanish
- Website: www.revistarcadia.com
- ISSN: 1900-589X
- OCLC: 62276551

Arcadia is a Colombian-based monthly magazine. The magazine offers articles on arts, literature and movies.

== See also ==
- Credencial
- El Malpensante
