= Wollochet, Washington =

Census-designated place in Pierce County, Washington, United States

- CDP
- Location within the state of Washington
- Coordinates: 47°16′07″N 122°35′02″W
- Country: United States
- State: Washington
- County: Pierce
- Elevation: 190 ft (58 m)
- Time zone: UTC-8 (Pacific (PST))
  - Summer (DST): UTC-7 (PDT)
- ZIP Code: 98335
- Area code(s): 360, 564
- GNIS feature ID: 2585053

Wollochet is located in Pierce County and is a census-designated place community. As of the 2020 census, Wollochet had a population of 6,769. The ZIP Code for Wollochet is 98335.

== Demographics ==
Historical population
Census	Pop.	Note	%±
2010	6,651		—
2020	6,769		1.8%
U.S. Decennial Census; 2000 2010

Wollochet first appeared as a census designated place in the 2010 U.S. census.

=== Racial and ethnic composition ===
Wollochet CDP, Washington – Racial and ethnic composition Note: the US Census treats Hispanic/Latino as an ethnic category. This table excludes Latinos from the racial categories and assigns them to a separate category. Hispanics/Latinos may be of any race.
Race / Ethnicity (NH = Non-Hispanic)	Pop 2010	Pop 2020	% 2010	% 2020
White alone (NH)	5,765	5,516	86.68%	81.49%
Black or African American alone (NH)	79	83	1.19%	1.23%
Native American or Alaska Native alone (NH)	43	42	0.65%	0.62%
Asian alone (NH)	242	279	3.64%	4.12%
Native Hawaiian or Pacific Islander alone (NH)	16	31	0.24%	0.46%
Other race alone (NH)	14	29	0.21%	0.43%
Mixed race or Multiracial (NH)	222	432	3.34%	6.38%
Hispanic or Latino (any race)	270	357	4.06%	5.27%
Total	6,651	6,769	100.00%	100.00%
