= Arcadia, Washington =

Unincorporated community in Washington, United States

- Unincorporated community
- Location within Washington (state) Location within the United States
- Coordinates: 47°11′53″N 122°56′26″W
- Country: United States
- State: Washington
- County: Mason
- Elevation: 33 ft (10 m)
- Time zone: UTC-8 (Pacific (PST))
  - Summer (DST): UTC-7 (PDT)
- GNIS feature ID: 1510785

Arcadia, Washington is an unincorporated community in Mason County, Washington, which is located on southwest Puget Sound on a point of land which extends between Hammersley Inlet on the north and Totten Inlet on the south. It is situated between Olympia, Washington and Shelton, Washington.

== History ==
Two steamboats are reported to have been built at Arcadia, the Arcadia (built 1889, 40 tons), and Biz (built 1881, 70 ft or 21.3 m, 80 gross tons).
