= Río Seco, Tucumán =

Coordinates: 27°16′S 65°32′W

Río Seco
- Interactive map of Río Seco
- Country: Argentina
- Province: Tucumán Province
- Time zone: UTC−3 (ART)

Río Seco is a settlement in Tucumán Province in northern Argentina.
