= The Arcadian Singers =

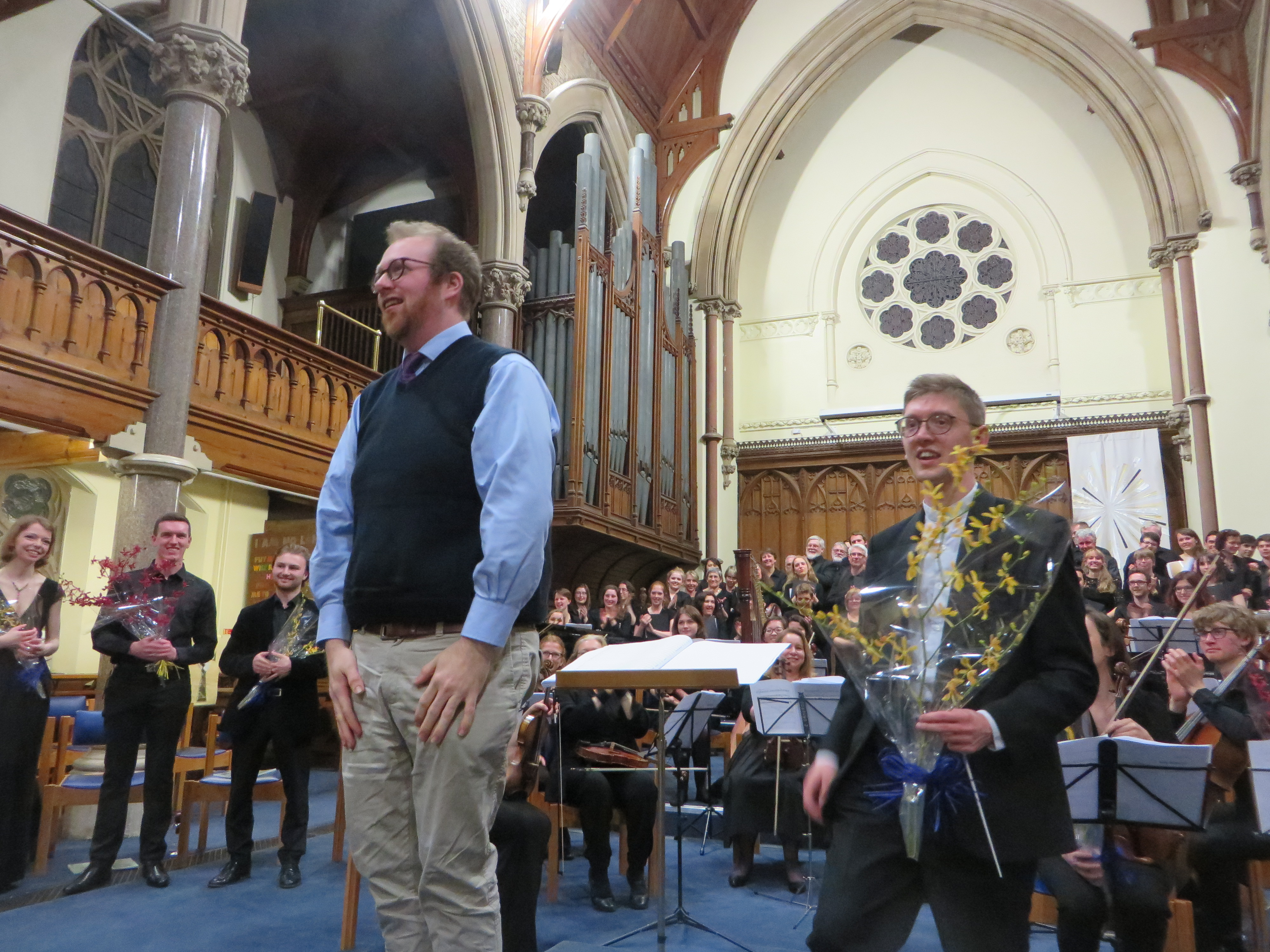
The composer Oliver Tarney and the conductor Tomos Watkins at the end of a 40th anniversary concert by the Arcadian Singers, held on 30 April 2016 at the Wesley Memorial Church in central Oxford, England

The Arcadian Singers of Oxford (aka The Arcadian Singers) is an independent, student-run chamber choir based in Oxford, England, originally formed in 1976 as a madrigal choir. It is a leading choir in the city and performs a wide range of music. Jamie Powe is the current musical director of The Arcadian Singers. Previous conductors have included Christopher Ward and Alexander Campkin.

The choir consists of between 16 and 24 singers, drawn mainly from the students and staff of Oxford University. It performs at least one concert each term in Oxford, and in recent years has released three CDs (Jubilate Agno, Salvator Mundi, recorded in the chapel of Merton College, and Easter at Ampleforth, recorded at Ampleforth Abbey). The choir has also been broadcast on BBC Radio 3, and each year participates in the Easter Liturgy at Ampleforth Abbey as well as tours throughout the UK. In April 2019, the choir celebrated its 25th anniversary of its partnership with Ampleforth Abbey and recorded the crowdfunded CD Easter at Ampleforth, which was released in 2020.

The choir has performed in many venues around Oxford, including college chapels (recently Brasenose College, Exeter College, Hertford College, Keble College, Pembroke College, and University College), the Sheldonian Theatre, the University Church and St Michael at the Northgate. The choir has also sung at St Paul's Cathedral and Westminster Abbey in London.

A 40th anniversary concert was held on 30 April 2016 with music by Thomas Tallis (the 40-part Spem in alium composed c.1570), Herbert Howells (his unpublished Requiem of 1932, also performed in 2014) and Oliver Tarney (Magnificat, a 2014 composition) at the Wesley Memorial Church in New Inn Hall Street, Oxford.

The choir has been reviewed by BBC Music Magazine, Cathedral Music, and Choir & Organ. The singer Katherine Jenkins and the conductor James Morgan have performed with the choir, including Cymru Fach on the Anthems for Wales album by Classic FM.

In 2015, the choir organised a national Women Composers Competition with the British composer Cecilia McDowall on the panel.
