= Arcades (Crete) =

Town and polis of ancient Crete

Arcades Ἀρκάδες Arcadia (Ἀρκαδία)
- polis (city-state)
- Location in ancient Crete
- Coordinates: 35°04′49″N 25°16′57″E
- Country: Greece
- Region: Crete
- Island: Crete

Arcades or Arkades (Ancient Greek: Ἀρκάδες), also Arcadia or Arkadia (Ἀρκαδία), was a town and polis (city-state) of ancient Crete. It disputed the claims of Mount Ida to be the birthplace of Zeus.

Seneca the Younger collects a fragment of Theophrastus in which he says that in Crete there was a city called Arcadia where the springs and lakes dried up because they stopped cultivating the land after the destruction of the city. As a consequence, the terrain became harder and therefore it did not give way to the rains. He adds that they later re-cultivated the land and the waters returned. During the Lyttian War about 220 BCE, at first all the Cretans were fighting against Lyctus, but then disagreements arose among the Cretans and some, like the people of Arcades, together with the inhabitants of Polyrrhenia, Ceraea, Orus and Lappa allied with Lyctus. Arcades is mentioned in the list of Cretan cities that signed an alliance with Eumenes II of Pergamon in the year 183 BCE, and also appears in the list of 22 cities of Crete by the Byzantine geographer of the 6th century Hierocles. Arcades minted coins from approximately 330-280/70 BCE where the inscription «ΑΡΚΑΔΩΝ» appears. There is also epigraphic evidence that Asclepius was worshiped in the city.

The site of Arcades is located near modern Kefalas, Inion.
