= Arcadia Beach =

Beach in Odesa, Ukraine

Coordinates: 46°25′38″N 30°46′00″E

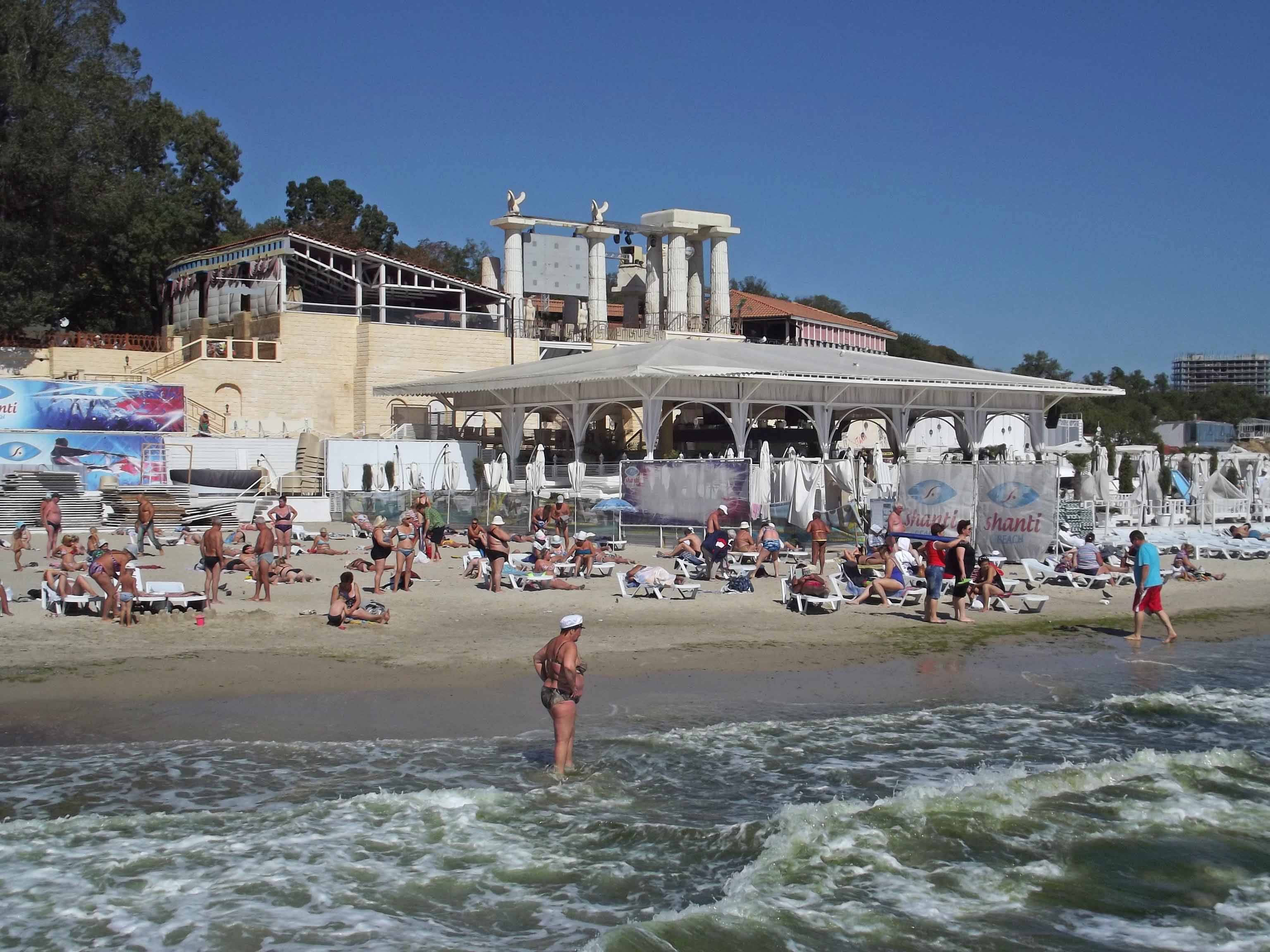
Arcadia Beach.

Arcadia Beach (Ukrainian: Пляж Аркадія, romanized: Pliazh Arkadiia) is Odesa, Ukraine's most famous beach. It is located in the Arcadia quarter.

The founders of Odesa chose this name for this area in the hopes it would help make it a success as a holiday resort. There is a main beach which has water slides and several smaller beaches. Arcadia is a popular beach, health resort, and summer nightspot in Odesa. Its nightclubs are open from May through September, and are Odesa's primary nightlife during that time.
