= Arcadia, Spotsylvania County, Virginia =

Arcadia, Spotsylvania County
- Unincorporated community
- Location within Northern Virginia Location within Virginia Location within the United States
- Coordinates: 38°6′23″N 77°31′47″W
- Country: United States
- State: Virginia
- County: Spotsylvania
- Time zone: UTC−5 (Eastern (EST))
  - Summer (DST): UTC−4 (EDT)

Arcadia is an unincorporated community in Spotsylvania County in the U.S. state of Virginia.

== Transportation ==
Arcadia is located along the Jefferson Davis Highway (U.S. 1) at its intersection with Arcadia Drive (VA 603).

== Historic sites ==
- Beulah Church and Cemetery
