= USS Arcadia (SP-856) =

Patrol vessel of the United States Navy

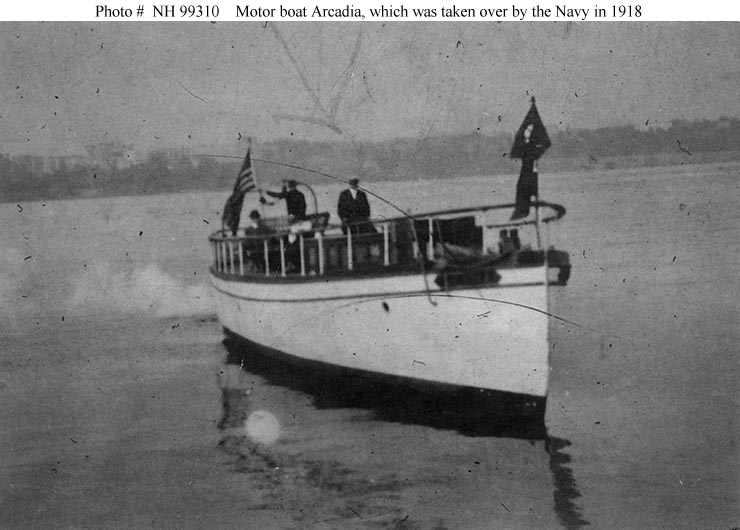
- Arcadia as a private motorboat sometime between 1915 and 1917.

History

United States
- Name: USS Arcadia
- Namesake: Previous name retained
- Builder: Frank S. Terry, Brooklyn, New York
- Completed: 1915
- Acquired: 8 October 1918
- Commissioned: Possibly October 1918, possibly never
- Stricken: 6 November 1918
- Fate: Returned to owner sometime between 6 November 1918 and May 1919
- Notes: Operated as private motorboat Arcadia 1915-1917 and from 1918 or 1919

General characteristics
- Type: Patrol vessel
- Tonnage: 30 Gross register tons
- Length: 55 ft 0 in (16.76 m)
- Beam: 14 ft 1 in (4.29 m)
- Draft: 4 ft 3 in (1.30 m) mean
- Speed: 10.4 knots
- Complement: 13
- Armament: 1 × 3-pounder gun; 1 × 1-pounder gun; 2 × machine guns

The first USS Arcadia (SP-856) was a motorboat that may have seen brief service as a United States Navy patrol vessel in late 1918.

Arcadia was built as a private wooden motorboat of the same name in 1915 by Frank S. Terry at Brooklyn, New York. In 1917, the U.S. Navy chartered her from her owner for use as a section patrol boat during World War I and took delivery of her on 8 October 1918. No logbooks exist to confirm that she was commissioned as USS Arcadia (SP-856) or to describe the extent and nature of her U.S. Navy service. Given the short period the Navy controlled her and the ending of the war just under five weeks after her acquisition, it is possible that she never was commissioned.

Arcadia's final disposition also is murky. One source states that Arcadia was turned over to her owner and stricken from the Navy List on 6 November 1918, while another indicates that a lump sum for the charter of the craft had been determined on 3 February 1919 and that Arcadia had been authorized for return to her owner. It appears that she was returned to her owner by no later than May 1919.
