= USS Arcadia (ID-1605) =

American ocean liner

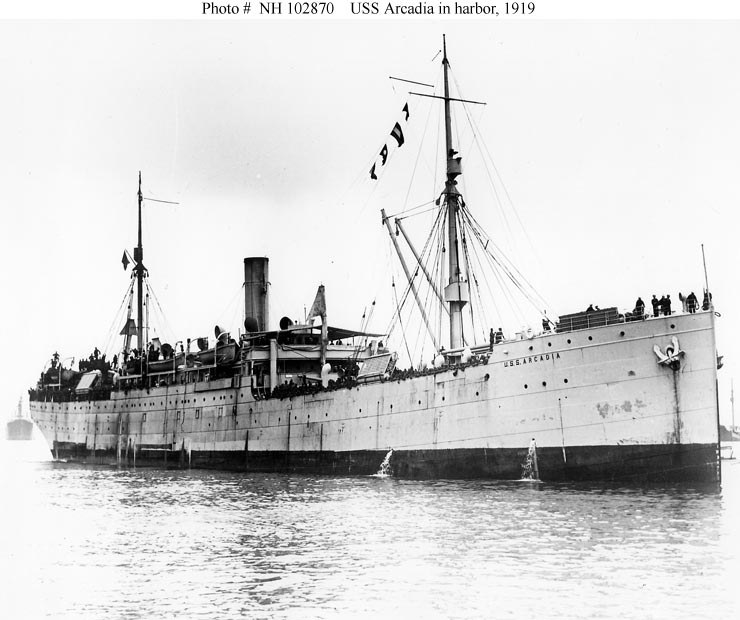
- Arcadia as a troop ship in 1919

History
- Name: Arcadia
- Namesake: Arcadia
- Owner: 1897: Hamburg America Line; 1917: US Shipping Board; 1919: United States Navy; 1923: California Steamship Co
- Port of registry: 1897: (German Empire) Hamburg; 1917: (United States) New York; 1923: Panama
- Route: April 1897: Hamburg – Montreal; December 1897: Hamburg – Portland – Boston
- Builder: Harland & Wolff, Belfast
- Yard number: 308
- Launched: 8 October 1896
- Acquired: seized by USA, 6 April 1917
- Commissioned: into US Navy, 20 January 1919
- Decommissioned: from US Navy, 29 September 1919
- Maiden voyage: 2 April 1897
- Reclassified: troop ship, 1919
- Stricken: 29 September 1919
- Identification: code letters: 1897–1917: RKPL; 1919 (US Navy): GJDH; 1919 (US Shipping Board): LHJP; 1914: wireless call sign DXC; 1919: pennant number ID-1605
- Fate: Scrapped 1927

General characteristics
- Type: Ocean liner
- Tonnage: 1914: 6,603 GRT, 3,514 NRT
- Displacement: 7,138 tons
- Length: 399.2 ft (121.7 m)
- Beam: 49.2 ft (15.0 m)
- Draft: 25 ft 3 in (7.70 m) mean
- Depth: 27.3 ft (8.3 m)
- Decks: 2
- Installed power: 330 NHP, 1,745 IHP
- Propulsion: 1 × quadruple-expansion engine; 1 × propeller
- Speed: 13 knots (24 km/h)
- Capacity: passengers: 20 first class; 1,100 third class
- Troops: at least 1,024
- Complement: as troop ship: 198
- Crew: in civilian service: 54
- Armament: 1917–18: 2 × 3 in (76 mm) guns
- Notes: sister ships: Adria, Armenia, Andalusia, Arabia

USS Arcadia (ID-1605) was a transatlantic liner that was launched in Ireland in 1896 and spent most of her career with Hamburg America Line (HAPAG). She was one of a series of at least five HAPAG sister ships that were built in the United Kingdom in 1896 and 1897.

The US Government seized Arcadia in 1917 and the US Navy used her as a troop ship in 1919. She remained with the United States Shipping Board until 1923, when the California Steamship Company bought her. She was scrapped in Japan in 1927.

== Building ==
In 1896 and 1897 shipyards in England and Ireland built a set of passenger and cargo ships for HAPAG. Palmers Shipbuilding and Iron Company in Jarrow, County Durham launched Adria, Armenia and Andalusia in May, June and August 1896. Harland & Wolff in Belfast followed with Arcadia as yard number 308, launching her on 8 October 1896 and completing her on 2 April 1897. Harland and Wolff also built Arabia, launching her in November 1896 and completing her in March 1897.

Arcadia's registered length was 399.2 ft (121.7 m), her beam was 49.2 ft (15.0 m) and her depth was 27.3 ft (8.3 m). Her tonnages were 6,603 GRT, 3,514 NRT and 7,138 tons displacement.

Arcadia had a single propeller, driven by a four-cylinder quadruple-expansion steam engine. It was rated at 330 NHP or 1,745 IHP and gave her a speed of 13 knots (24 km/h).

HAPAG registered Arcadia in Hamburg. Her code letters were RKPL.

== German service ==
On 2 April 1897 Arcadia began her maiden voyage from Hamburg to Montreal. On 16 May, en route from Montreal to Liverpool, she ran aground near Cape Ray, Newfoundland.

On 23 May the Royal Navy corvette HMS Cordelia, sloops Buzzard and Pelican and five tugs together towed Arcadia off the rocks. She then reached safe anchorage in Port aux Basques under her own steam. She then went to Quebec for temporary repairs before crossing the Atlantic to Harland and Wolff in Belfast for permanent repairs.

Arcadia returned to service in November 1897 with a voyage from Hamburg to New York. That December, HAPAG put her on the route from Hamburg to Boston via Portland, Maine.

By 1914 Arcadia was equipped for wireless telegraphy. Her call sign was DXC.

On 25 or 30 July 1914, amid the July Crisis in Europe, Arcadia left Hamburg for Baltimore. In the first week of August, Germany had declared war on France and the UK had declared war on Germany. Arcadia did not reach neutral US waters until 18 August, and was the last HAPAG liner to reach safety. On 19 August she was reported to be heading for Newport News, Virginia.

== US service ==
On 6 April 1917 The US declared war on Germany. The United States Customs Service seized Arcadia as enemy property and vested her in the US Shipping Board. US immigration officers detained her crew. The USSB had her defensively armed with two 3-inch (76 mm) naval guns, crewed by US Navy gunners. After the Armistice of 11 November 1918 the guns and naval detachment were removed at Baltimore on 4 December 1918.

On 20 January 1919 at Hoboken, New Jersey, Arcadia was commissioned into the US Navy as USS Arcadia, with the pennant number ID-1605 and code letters GJDH. Lt Cdr Peter F Johnsen, USNRF, was appointed to command her, and she was assigned to the Cruiser and Transport Force.

The Navy put Arcadia in transatlantic service. On her first voyage she left Hoboken in cargo on 2 February 1919 and reached Saint-Nazaire in France on 19 February. She returned in ballast and bringing home members of the American Expeditionary Forces. She left St-Nazaire on 1 March and after a rough passage reached Newport News on 17 March. She then put into Newport News Shipbuilding for repairs and alterations.

Arcadia left Newport News on 1 April 1919 and reached Bordeaux on 20 April, where she embarked more troops and loaded cargo including aeroplane and gun parts. She left Bordeaux on 26 April and reached Bush Terminal, New York, on 11 May, bringing home 1,024 officers and men of the 82nd Division. Later that month she left New York, reaching Bordeaux early in June. There she embarked more troops, whom she brought to Newport News.

In the remainder of the summer Arcadia made two more voyages, one from St-Nazaire to Hampton Roads and the other from Brest, France to Hoboken. In total she completed five round trips across the North Atlantic for the Navy, and repatriated more than 4,700 troops.

Arcadia completed her final voyage to Hoboken on 11 September. The next day she left Hoboken for Hampton Roads, where she moored alongside West Loquassuck at Bush Bluff, Virginia. She then briefly visited Newport News Shipbuilding, before returning to Bush Bluff. On 29 September she was decommissioned and stricken from the Navy list.

== Final years ==
On 29 September 1919 the US Navy returned Arcadia to the USSB. In 1923 the USSB sold her to the California Steamship Company, which registered her in Panama. In January 1927 the company sold her in Shanghai in China, whence she was taken to Japan and scrapped.
