= USS Arcadia (AD-23) =

Tender of the United States Navy

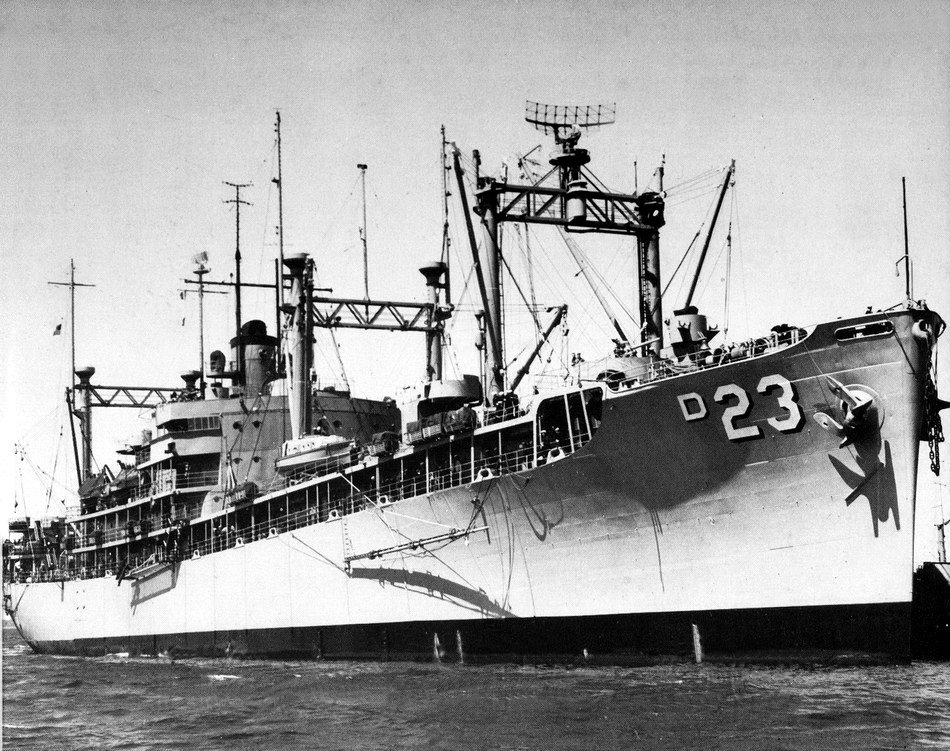
- USS Arcadia (AD-23) in 1958.

History

United States
- Name: USS Arcadia
- Builder: Los Angeles Shipbuilding and Dry Dock Company, San Pedro, California
- Laid down: 6 March 1944
- Launched: 19 November 1944
- Commissioned: 13 September 1945
- Decommissioned: 28 June 1968
- Stricken: 1 July 1973
- Fate: Sold for scrapping, 1 August 1974

General characteristics
- Class & type: Klondike-class destroyer tender
- Displacement: 8,165 long tons (8,296 t) light; 11,755 long tons (11,944 t) full
- Length: 492 ft (150 m)
- Beam: 69 ft 8 in (21.23 m)
- Draft: 27 ft 3 in (8.31 m)
- Propulsion: Geared turbines, 8,500 shp (6,338 kW)
- Speed: 18.4 knots (34.1 km/h; 21.2 mph)
- Complement: 826
- Armament: 1 × 5-inch/38-caliber gun; 4 × 3"/50 caliber guns; 4 × 40 mm AA guns; 20 × 20 mm guns

USS Arcadia was one of four Klondike-class destroyer tenders built at the tail end of World War II for the United States Navy, and the third U.S. Naval vessel to bear that name. Destroyer tenders were typically named after U.S. National Parks. However the destroyer tender AD-23 was apparently misnamed Arcadia in an effort to commemorate Acadia National Park in Maine.

Arcadia was laid down on 6 March 1944 at Los Angeles Shipbuilding and Dry Dock Company, San Pedro, California; launched on 19 November; sponsored by the widow of Captain Edward L. Beach; fitted out at Terminal Island, San Pedro, California; and commissioned on 13 September 1945.

== Service history ==
Following shakedown training off San Diego, the destroyer tender departed the west coast to join the Atlantic Fleet at Charleston, S.C. World War II had been over for several months when she arrived at her berth on the Wando River on 1 December. Arcadia served as tender to destroyers joining the inactive fleet at Charleston, and she also developed the official program for decommissioning and inactivation to be used by tenders of her own class. Arcadia was placed in commission, in reserve, on 7 February 1947 and served as accommodation vessel for Submarine Group 1 of the Charleston group, Atlantic Reserve Fleet. She was placed in full commission on 1 August 1951 and assigned a new home port, Newport, R.I., where she tended destroyers in the Narragansett Bay area.

Arcadia supported the Atlantic Fleet with repair services until 1968 when she was decommissioned. She served as 6th Fleet destroyer tender during many deployments to the Mediterranean where she made working visits to such ports as Naples, Italy; Cannes, France; Valencia, Spain, Palma, and Barcelona, Spain; Lisbon, Portugal; Piraeus, Greece; and Istanbul, Turkey. The tender visited the Caribbean while exercising in yearly "Springboard" operations in the 1950s and 1960s, calling at ports in the Dominican Republic, Puerto Rico, Jamaica, and the Virgin Islands. In October 1964 Arcadia steamed to Orange, Texas to strip five mothballed high-speed transports for parts needed by active duty destroyers. The six-week trip netted nearly $800,000 worth of parts and equipment for use by the ships of the Atlantic Fleet.

Although she serviced destroyers primarily, Arcadia was called upon in November 1966 to repair the aircraft carrier USS Saratoga. The tender departed Newport on 19 November for the cruise to Mayport, Florida where she remained until 13 December completing the repair work needed following a Mediterranean cruise. Upon completing work on the "Sara" she sailed for Roosevelt Rhodes Puerto Rice, then San Juan for about 4 weeks, she then returned to Newport and resumed her normal operations. In both 1966 and 1967, Arcadia made cruises to Key West and Naval Station Mayport to provide services to Destroyer Division 601, Destroyer Squadron 16, and reserve training destroyers from various ports in the Gulf of Mexico.

Arcadia was decommissioned on 28 June 1968, berthed in the National Defense Reserve Fleet contingent in the James River on 15 November, and formally transferred to the Maritime Administration on 30 June 1969. Her name was struck from the Naval Vessel Register on 1 July 1973, and she was sold to Levin Metals of San Jose, California on 1 August 1974 and scrapped in San Pedro, California.
