= First Nations in New Brunswick =

The First Nations of New Brunswick, Canada number more than 16,000, mostly Miꞌkmaq and Wolastoqey (Maliseet). Although the Peskotomuhkati Nation maintains a land claim at Saint Andrews, New Brunswick and historically occurred in New Brunswick, they have no reserves in the province, and have no official status in Canada.

== List of First Nations ==
New Brunswick is home to 15 First Nations.

| Name as used by Indigenous and Northern Affairs Canada | Ethnic/national group | Tribal council | Population (July 2021) | | | Notes |
| Name as used by Indigenous and Northern Affairs Canada | Ethnic/national group | Tribal council | On reserve | Off reserve | Total | Notes |
|---|---|---|---|---|---|---|
| Bilijk | Wolastoqiyik | Wolastoqey | 739 | 325 | 1,064 | |
| Buctouche MicMac | Miꞌkmaq | North Shore | 80 | 42 | 122 | Tjipõgtõtjg |
| Eel River Bar | Miꞌkmaq | North Shore | 362 | 441 | 803 | Ugpi'ganjig |
| Elsipogtog | Miꞌkmaq | Mawiw | 2,738 | 761 | 3,499 | |
| Esgenoôpetitj | Miꞌkmaq | Mawiw | 1,382 | 559 | 1,941 | |
| Fort Folly | Miꞌkmaq | North Shore | 35 | 101 | 136 | Amlamgog |
| Indian Island | Miꞌkmaq | North Shore | 112 | 100 | 212 | L'nui Menikuk |
| Madawaska Maliseet | Wolastoqiyik | Wolastoqey | 163 | 217 | 380 | |
| Metepenagiag Miꞌkmaq | Miꞌkmaq | North Shore | 465 | 237 | 702 | |
| Natoaganeg | Miꞌkmaq | North Shore | 593 | 483 | 1,076 | |
| Oromocto | Wolastoqiyik | Wolastoqey | 342 | 460 | 802 | Welamukotuk |
| Pabineau | Miꞌkmaq | North Shore | 105 | 238 | 343 | Oinpegitjoig |
| Saint Mary's | Wolastoqiyik | Wolastoqey | 940 | 1,084 | 2,024 | Sitansisk |
| Tobique | Wolastoqiyik | Mawiw | 1,594 | 976 | 2,570 | Neqotkuk |
| Woodstock | Wolastoqiyik | Wolastoqey | 301 | 854 | 1,155 | |
| Total population | | | 9,951 | 6,878 | 16,829 | |

== List of Indian reserves ==
New Brunswick is home to 32 Indian reserves, of which 20 are recognized as census subdivisions by Statistics Canada. Census subdivision boundaries may differ from those of reserve.

| Name as used by Indigenous and Northern Affairs Canada | First Nation(s) | Ethnic/national group | Area | | Population | | | Location |
| Name as used by Indigenous and Northern Affairs Canada | First Nation(s) | Ethnic/national group | ha | acre | 2021 | 2016 | Change | Location |
|---|---|---|---|---|---|---|---|---|
| Big Hole Tract 8 (North Half) | Metepenagiag | Miꞌkmaq | 1,396.2 | 3,450.1 | 30 | 25 | ▲20.0% | |
| Big Hole Tract 8 (South Half) | Natoaganeg | Miꞌkmaq | 1,740.2 | 4,300.1 | 16 | 23 | ▼30.4% | |
| Bilijk | Bilijk | Wolastoqiyik | 374.7 | 925.9 | 518 | 493 | ▲5.1% | Kingsclear 6 for census purposes |
| Buctouche 16 | Buctouche | Miꞌkmaq | 62.3 | 153.9 | 101 | 96 | ▲5.2% | |
| Buctouche Micmac Band Extension | Buctouche | Miꞌkmaq | 89.6 | 221.4 | | | | Near Coates Mills |
| Devon 30 | Saint Mary's | Wolastoqiyik | 125.9 | 311.1 | 1,070 | 1,038 | ▲3.1% | |
| Eel Ground 2 | Natoaganeg | Miꞌkmaq | 1,072.8 | 2,650.9 | 545 | 532 | ▲2.4% | |
| Eel River 3 | Eel River Bar | Miꞌkmaq | 122.0 | 301.5 | 342 | 329 | ▲4.0% | |
| Esgenoôpetitj Indian Reserve No. 14 | Esgenoopetitj | Miꞌkmaq | 985.4 | 2,435.0 | 1,223 | 1,179 | ▲3.7% | Esgenoôpetitj 14 for census purposes |
| Fort Folly 1 | Fort Folly | Miꞌkmaq | 56.1 | 138.6 | 36 | 40 | ▼10.0% | |
| Indian Island 28 | Indian Island | Miꞌkmaq | 38.4 | 94.9 | 116 | 153 | ▼24.2% | |
| Indian Point 1 | Metepenagiag | Miꞌkmaq | 41.2 | 101.8 | | | | Inland of Sunny Corner |
| Indian Ranch | Eel River Bar | Miꞌkmaq | 45.7 | 112.9 | 134 | 89 | ▲50.6% | |
| Metepenagiag Urban Reserve 3 | Metepenagiag | Miꞌkmaq | 19.9 | 49.2 | | | | Junction of Harrisville Boulevard and Route 2, Moncton |
| Metepenagiag Urban Reserve 8 | Metepenagiag | Miꞌkmaq | 3.6 | 8.9 | | | | Junction of Harrisville Boulevard and Route 2, Moncton |
| Metepenagiag Uta'nk | Metepenagiag | Miꞌkmaq | 1.1 | 2.7 | | | | Junction of King George Highway and Douglastown Boulevard, Miramichi |
| Moose Meadows 4 | Eel River Bar | Miꞌkmaq | 404.7 | 1,000.0 | | | | 32 km inland of Dalhousie |
| Oinpegitjoig Indian Reserve | Pabineau | Miꞌkmaq | 18.6 | 46.0 | | | | Junction of Route 11 and Route 180, Bathurst |
| Oromocto 26 | Oromocto | Wolastoqiyik | 100.7 | 248.8 | 295 | 282 | ▲4.6% | |
| Pabineau 11 | Pabineau | Miꞌkmaq | 429.1 | 1,060.3 | 133 | 134 | ▼0.7% | |
| Pokemouche 13 | Esgenoopetitj | Miꞌkmaq | 151.4 | 374.1 | | | | South side of Pokemouche River, opposite Maltampec |
| Red Bank 4 | Metepenagiag | Miꞌkmaq | 1,457.0 | 3,600.3 | 400 | 309 | ▲29.4% | |
| Red Bank 7 | Metepenagiag | Miꞌkmaq | 1,011.7 | 2,500.0 | | | | North of Red Bank 7, two portions near Sillikers and Sunny Corner |
| Renous 12 | Natoaganeg | Miꞌkmaq | 10.0 | 24.7 | 10 | 5 | ▲100.0% | |
| Richibucto 15 | Elsipogtog | Miꞌkmaq | 1,956.2 | 4,833.9 | 2,062 | 1,942 | ▲6.2% | |
| Soegao No. 35 | Elsipogtog | Miꞌkmaq | 130.1 | 321.5 | | | | Three parcels east of Steeves Mountain |
| St. Basile 10 | Madawaska | Wolastoqiyik | 344.8 | 852.0 | 369 | 214 | ▲72.4% | |
| St. Mary's 24 | Saint Mary's | Wolastoqiyik | 1.0 | 2.5 | | | | North side of Fredericton; Included with Devon 30 for census purposes |
| Tabusintac 9 | Esgenoopetitj | Miꞌkmaq | 3,268.7 | 8,077.1 | 20 | 10 | ▲100.0% | |
| The Brothers 18 | Bilijk, Madawaska, Tobique, Woodstock | Wolastoqiyik | 4.0 | 9.9 | | | | Two islands in Kennebecasis River, north of Millidgeville |
| Tobique 20 | Tobique | Wolastoqiyik | 2,724.0 | 6,731.2 | 1,080 | 968 | ▲11.6% | |
| Woodstock 23 | Woodstock | Wolastoqiyik | 159.8 | 394.9 | 435 | 327 | ▲33.0% | |
