= Indian Island =

Indian Island can refer:

== Places ==
=== Populated places ===
- Indian Island, Washington, an unincorporated community in Jefferson County, Washington state, USA
- Penobscot Indian Island Reservation, near Old Town, Maine, USA; known colloquially as Indian Island
- Indian Island 28, a Miꞌkmaq Indian reserve near Richibucto, New Brunswick, Canada

=== Islands ===
- West Indies, in Caribbean Sea.
- Indian Island (Lake Erie), in Maumee Bay, Michigan, USA
- Indian Island (Humboldt Bay), also known as Tuluwat Island or Gunther Island, in Eureka, California, USA
- Indian Island (South Oyster Bay) on Strongs Creek and the East West Channel in South Oyster Bay, Copiague, New York, USA
- Indian Island (New Zealand), in Tamatea / Dusky Sound, New Zealand
- Indian Island (Bay of Fundy), in New Brunswick, Canada
- Indian Island, one of the three islands of The Brothers 18, in New Brunswick, Canada
- Indian Island 28, New Brunswick, Canada

=== Facilities and structures ===
- Indian Island Light, Rockport Harbor, Maine, USA

=== Fictional places ===
- Indian Island is the name of the main setting in the novel And Then There Were None by Agatha Christie, also known as "Ten Little Indians".

== Other uses ==
- Indian Island Massacre (1860), Tuluwat Island, Humboldt Bay, California, USA
- USS Indian Island, a WWII U.S. Navy Basilan-class auxiliary ship

== See also ==
- Insular India, India as an island continent
- List of islands in the Indian Ocean
- List of islands of India
