= Federal financing for small businesses in Canada =

Federal financing for small businesses in Canada is facilitated via a number of programs and agencies. Financing is available in the form of grants (sometimes called "non-repayable contributions"), loans, loan guarantees, income support and subsidized hiring and/or training programs. The government also provides funding for no-cost or subsidized services to small businesses, including workshops, business plan consulting, education, and federally sponsored trade missions. Financing, and federally funded or subsidized services are available both to established businesses looking to grow or expand into new markets and to entrepreneurs seeking to launch a new business.

== Definitions ==
- Grants – Grants or "non-repayable contributions" are the funding that does not need to be paid back.
- Loans – Loans may be low- or no-interest contributions. Financing methods and repayment requirements vary from conventional loan arrangements to situations in which the business fronts the costs, submits the costs to the agency, receives reimbursement for all or a portion of the costs, and then at a pre-determined date, the business begins to pay back the loan. Unlike most bank loans to small businesses, government loans may be unsecured.
- Loan guarantees – Under the Canadian Small Business Financing Act, the federal government may guarantee a financial institution's loan to a small business, to a maximum of 85 percent. If the borrower defaults on a loan, the bank is protected, and therefore more apt to offer small businesses financing.
- Income support – Various programs provide income support to entrepreneurs for fixed periods, often up to a year, so that they are not required to work or seek work while starting their businesses.
- Subsidies for hiring and training – In order to increase employment and to create qualified workers, the federal government funds a number of programs that allow employers to hire and/or train youth, unemployed individuals, and other target groups.
- Facilities subsidies – In some cases, facility rental and/or utilities may be subsidized for the small business
- Equity financing – The government may invest in a small business, with the advantage of less stringent demands than those of venture capitalists or other private investors.
- Tax refunds or tax credits – Tax refunds and credits vary by industry and region.

== Funding Sources ==
Funding and supportive services are administered by a variety of central, provincial, regional and local offices, including federal government departments, federal government agencies, non-profit corporations, financial institutions and chartered banks. Programs may be targeted by industry, region, or other criteria, such as programs for young entrepreneurs or Aboriginal entrepreneurs. Application requirements for federal grants and loans programs vary, but often include at minimum a completed business plan.

- The Business Guide to Government Programs
- Community Futures Development Corporations
- Western Economic Diversification Canada
- Atlantic Canada Opportunities Agency
- Human Resources and Social Development Canada
- The Business Development Bank of Canada
- The Canada Small Business Financing Program
