= Peter Lewis Paul =

Maliseet anthropologist

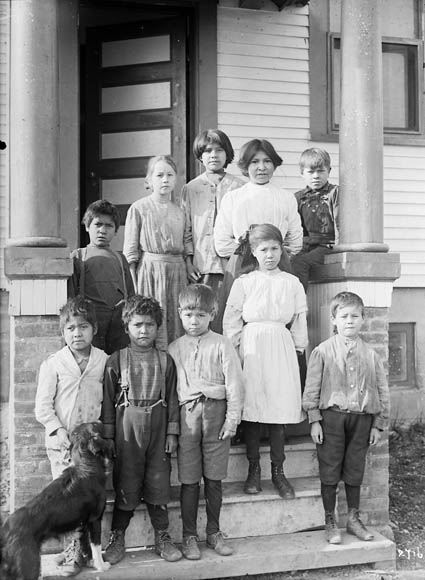
Maliseet First Nations students (Wulustukwiak) on the steps of an Indian day school near Woodstock, New Brunswick. The boy sitting on the far right was identified as Dr. Peter Lewis Paul, 1902-1989.

Peter Lewis Paul CM (1902 – August 25, 1989) was a Maliseet ethnohistorian who, from the 1930s on, helped and advised many of his contemporaries in exploring Maliseet culture.

== Biography ==
Peter Lewis Paul lived on the small Maliseet Woodstock Reserve on the banks of the Saint John River in New Brunswick, Canada. His mother and twin brother died in childbirth. Peter's father worked in a lumber camp, but after he left the reservation Paul was raised by his grandfather Nowell Polchies, who was a tribal elder and known as Wapeyit Piyel. Paul grew up hunting and learning family and tribal lore from his grandfather (his grandmother had a son that died in childbirth on the same day that Paul's mother did).

Paul married Minnie Dedham (1908–1974), granddaughter of Chief Gabe Atwin, in 1928. Together they had nine children: Rowenna, Donna, Carole, Diana, Wanda, Reggie, Robert, William and Darrell.

Paul became a fountain of traditional knowledge and generously shared information with numerous professional linguists, ethnohistorians, and anthropologists. The recipient of many honours, he was awarded a Centennial Medal in 1969, received an honorary Doctor of Letters degree from the University of New Brunswick in 1970, and the Order of Canada on June 29, 1987.

Peter Lewis Paul died on August 25, 1989, and was buried at the Calvary Cemetery in Woodstock, Carleton County, New Brunswick, Canada.
