= Bilijk First Nation =

First Nation in New Brunswick, Canada

Coordinates: 45°56′59″N 66°51′06″W

- Band No. 11
- Pilick Wolastoqiyik
- People: Wolastoqiyik
- Headquarters: Kingsclear
- Province: New Brunswick

Land
- Main reserve: Bilijk
- Reserve: The Brothers 18
- Land area: 374.90 hectares (926.4 acres)

Population (2026)
- On reserve: 734
- On other land: 2
- Off reserve: 348
- Total population: 1,084

Government
- Chief: Justice Gruben
- Council: Keyaira Gruben; Amanda Morgan-Polchies; Charlee Narvey; Amy Polchies; Patrick (Tyke) Polchies; Dylan (Dill) Sacobie; Amber Solomon; Derek Solomon; Desiree Solomon; Terry Young

Website
- Bilijk First Nation

Bilijk First Nation (Malecite-Passamaquoddy: Pilick Wolastoqiyik, IPA: [bilid͡ʒk wəlastəgʷewijik]), also known as Kingsclear First Nation, is a Wolastoqey First Nation band government located near the village of Kingsclear, New Brunswick, Canada.

== Population ==
The First Nation had a total of 1,084 people registered as of 2026, of which 734 lived on their own reserve.

== Governance ==
The current Chief of the Kingsclear First Nation is Chief Justice Gruben. The band is a member of the Wolastoqey Nation in New Brunswick and the Atlantic Policy Congress of First Nations.

== Reserve ==
The First Nation has two reserves. The main population center is Bilijk, which has an area of 374.90 hectares (926.4 acres). This reserve came into existence in 1840, under the New Brunswick Indian Act. The First Nation also shares The Brothers 18 Reserve, comprising two small islands of 4 hectares (9.9 acres) in Kennebecasis Bay, with other Wolastoqey nations.

== Notable people ==
- Mihku Paul (born 1958), poet and activist

== See also ==
- List of communities in New Brunswick
- First Nations in New Brunswick
