= Noël Bernard =

Noël Bernard may refer to:

- Noël Bernard (botanist) (1874–1911), French botanist
- Noël Bernard (journalist) (1925–1981), Romanian journalist
- Noël Bernard (Malecite leader), Malecite leader in New Brunswick, Canada
