= Mihku Paul =

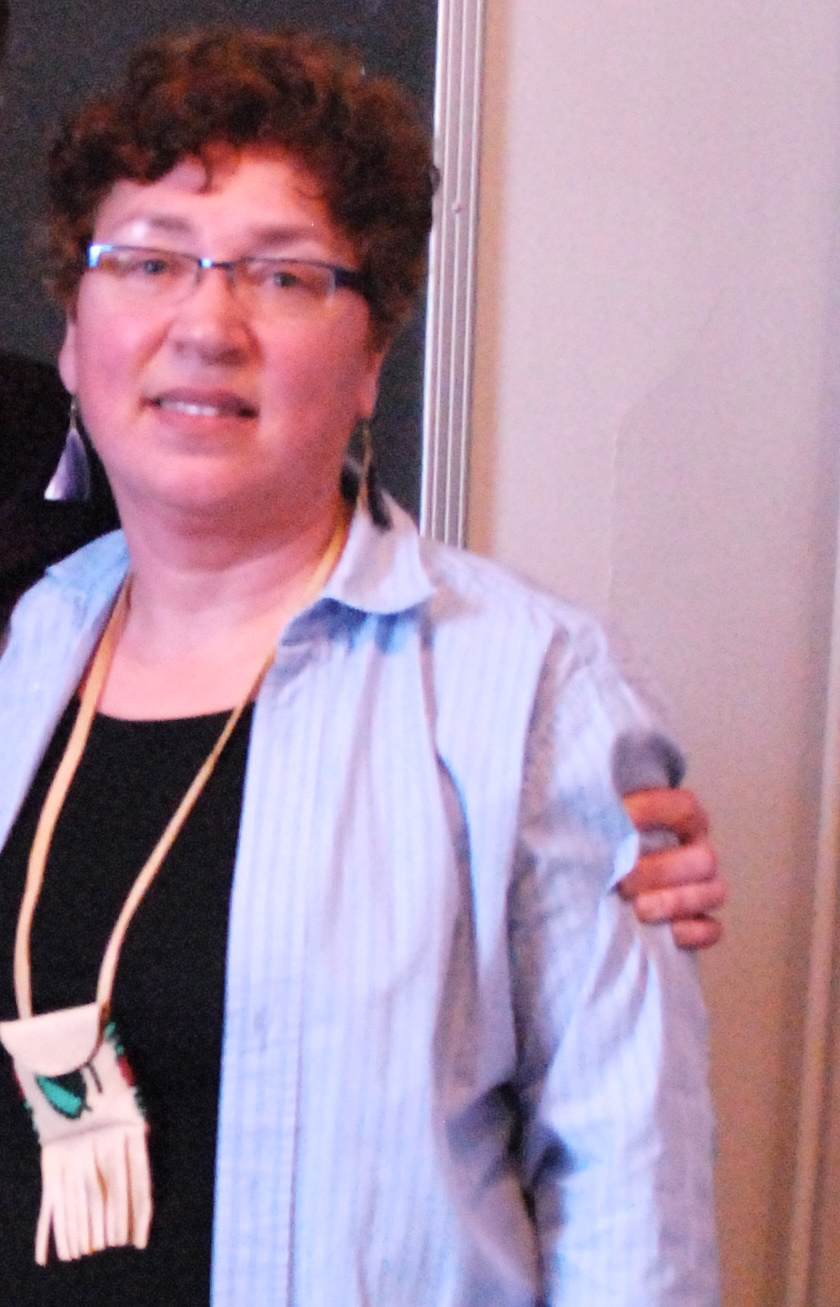
Mihku Paul in 2013

Mihku Paul (born 1958) is a First Nations poet, visual artist, storyteller, and activist. She was born into the Wolastoqey Nation and she is a member of Bilijk First Nation in New Brunswick, Canada. Mihku Paul currently resides in Portland, Maine where she teaches creative writing at the Maine Women Writers Collection at the University of New England.

== Published works ==
Mihku Paul's first chapbook, 20th Century PowWow Playland, was published by Bowman Books in Greenfield, New York in 2012. The poems describe Maliseet homeland, also known as Wolastoqiyik, and Paul's own thoughts on the rights and continuation of indigenous people in the northeast. This poem, as her most popular, is known for giving a voice to the African American community and the discrimination they face, although this was not her main goal of these poems. Some of her more popular poems include The Water Road, Mother Tongue, and Genocide and Me.

A number of poems also address Paul's dissatisfaction with the education she received in the Maine public school system. One of her most famous works would be Jefferson Street School also in 20th Century PowWow Playland. In this piece, Paul speaks as a "kindergarten captive" who is forced to memorize and recite the "invader's language" and the biased culture that was present.

Mihku Paul has also been published in magazines including Cabildo Quarterly Online.

Paul has recently been credited with writing a chapter in Transforming Our Practices which is a teach pedagogy text that focuses on Indigenous educational paradigms.

== Visual arts ==
Mihku Paul combines her poetry with visual art, creating works in pen and ink, watercolor, gouache, and mixed media collage. Although she never had any formal education in the visual arts field, she looks to support her identity through her artistic values. Paul's first multi-media exhibit was a 2010 installation at the Abbe Museum in Bar Harbor, Maine, entitled "Look Twice: The Waponahki in Image & Verse.” The poems that are published in the anthology Dawnland Voices were paired with photographs and her own drawings. She looked to use this piece as a way to redirect the viewers objective thoughts on Native American life and history. Her other pieces, which include medicine wheel paintings have been auctioned off for fundraising to support arts in the schools and by the Sierra Club to support local and regional projects.

== Activism ==
During her experience within the educational system off of her Wolastoqey reservation, she dealt with racism and discrimination. Paul looked to enhance the experience within education with the inclusion of Native Americans as people as well as their history. In Portland, Maine, she looked to work with the educational system and schools to spread the learning and understanding of Native Americans through storytelling and curriculum enhancements. She often speaks on issues regarding her experiences at different schools and events. Paul spoke at an event hosted by the Immigrant Legal Advocacy Project, Maine Wabanaki REACH, Maine Wabanaki-State Child Welfare Truth & Reconciliation Commission, and United to End Genocide. This event was called "Genocide & Maine: Shining the Light of Truth" and focused on making invisible genocide visible, make what is silenced about genocide heard, and motivate the development of awareness and action to face the challenges that affect the people of Maine.
