= Buctouche MicMac First Nation =

First Nation in New Brunswick, Canada

Coordinates: 46°27′07″N 64°45′31″W

- Band No. 4
- Tjipõgtõtjg
- People: Mi'kmaq
- Headquarters: Buctouche 16
- Province: New Brunswick

Land
- Main reserve: Buctouche 16
- Reserve: Buctouche MicMac Band Extension
- Land area: 151.9 hectares (375 acres)

Population (November 2026)
- On reserve: 79
- On other land: 1
- Off reserve: 46
- Total population: 126

Government
- Chief: Brenton (Vince) Leblanc

Tribal Council
- North Shore Mi'kmaq Tribal Council

Buctouche MicMac First Nation (Mi'kmaq: Tjipõgtõtjg) is a Mi'kmaq First Nation band government located near the town of Grand-Bouctouche, New Brunswick, Canada.

== Population ==
The First Nation had a total of 126 people registered as of November 2026, which 79 lived on their own reserve.

== Governance ==
The current Chief of Buctouche MicMac First Nation is Chief Brenton (Vince) Leblanc. The band is a member of the North Shore Mi'kmaq Tribal Council.

== Reserve ==
The First Nation has two reserves: Buctouche 16, with an area of 62.30 hectares (153.9 acres), and Buctouche MicMac Band Extension, with an area of 89.60 hectares (221.4 acres).

== See also ==
- List of communities in New Brunswick
- First Nations in New Brunswick
