= Woodstock First Nation =

Canadian First Nations tribe

Coordinates: 46.11°N 67.572°W

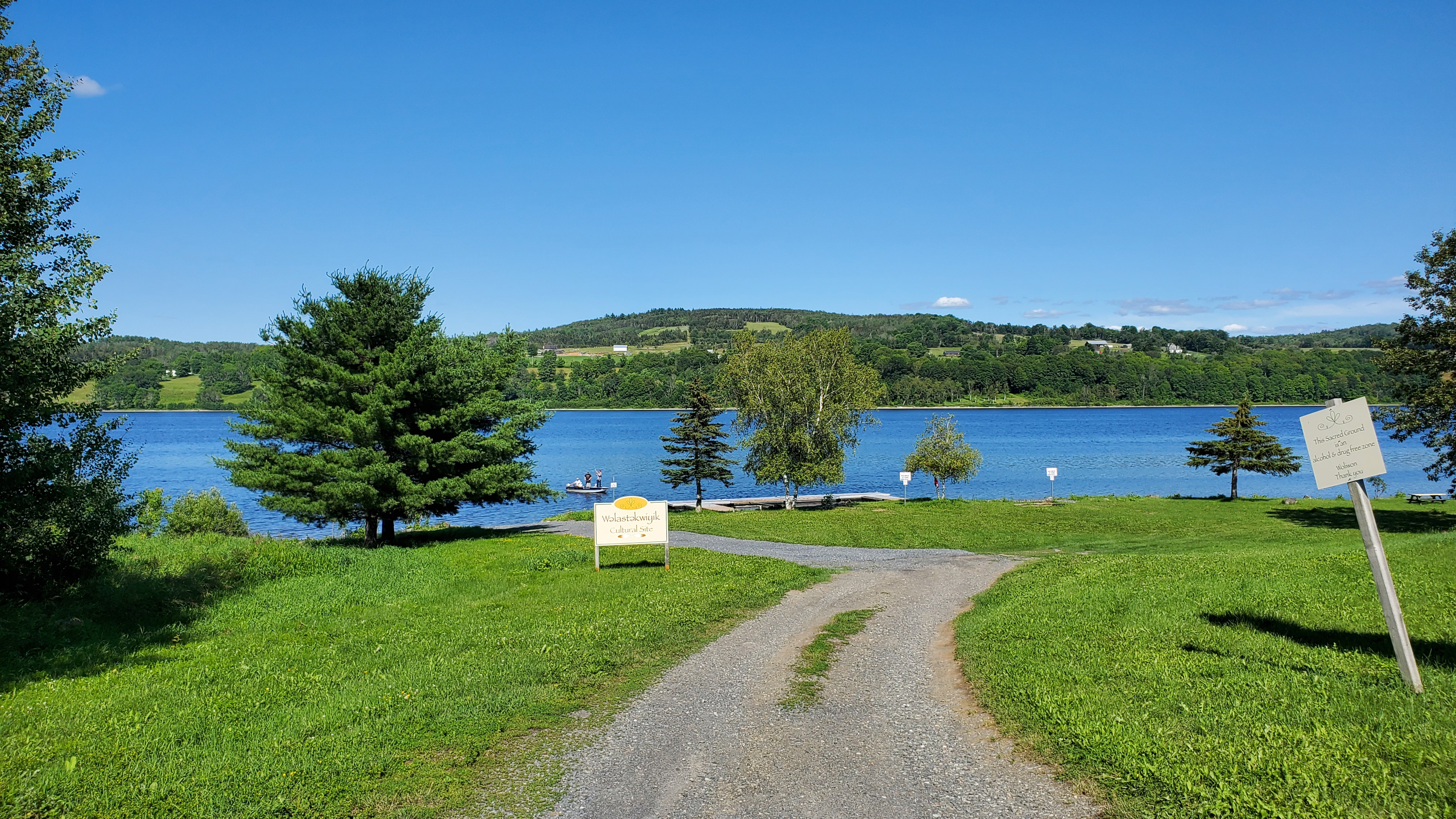
People fishing on the Saint John River near Wəlastəkwewiyik Cultural Site

The Woodstock First Nation are a Wolastoqiyik First Nation located in the Canadian Province of New Brunswick. They have an Indian reserve: Woodstock 23. It runs The Brothers 18 jointly with other First Nations.

== Media ==
On October 19, 2023 the Canadian Radio-television and Telecommunications Commission approved an application by Skigin Radio Incorporated to operate a low-power, Indigenous (Type B Native) FM radio station in Woodstock First Nation, New Brunswick on the frequency of 107.7 MHz.

== Economy ==
Carleton Enterprise, a member of the Canada Business Network, is responsible for economic development.
