= Wolastoqiyik Wahsipekuk First Nation =

First Nation in Quebec, Canada

Wolastoqiyik Wahsipekuk First Nation Band No. 54
- Back bustle of the Wolastoqiyik Wahsipekuk, Tobique, New Brunswick, 20th century
- People: Wolastoqiyik
- Headquarters: Cacouna
- Province: Quebec

Land
- Main reserve: Kataskomiq
- Other reserve(s): Cacouna Indian Reserve No. 22

Population (2025)
- On reserve: 4
- Off reserve: 2,352
- Total population: 2,356

Government
- Chief: Jacques Tremblay

Website
- wolastoqiyikwahsipekuk.ca

The Wolastoqiyik Wahsipekuk First Nation, formerly known as Maliseet Viger 1 First Nation, is an Algonquian People of the Wəlastəkwewiyik (Maliseet) Nation in Quebec, Canada. As of May, 2024 they were reported as having a registered population of 2035, all living off-reserve or on another reserve. They have two reserves, Cacouna 22 and Kataskomiq, and they are based at Cacouna in the Bas-Saint-Laurent region of Quebec.

The majority of the Walastoqiyik living in Quebec speak French, and many speak English. The Maliseet-Passamaquoddy language is still spoken by some people in Maine and New Brunswick.

== Geography ==
The Viger nation has two reserves: Kataskomiq (formerly known as Whitworth) and Cacouna 22, both at Bas-Saint-Laurent in Quebec. The nearest large town is Rivière-du-Loup.

== Government ==
In addition to a Band council, the Viger nation has a council of sages composed of elders who have a role of examining political decisions which could influence the functioning of the nation. The council of sages also serves as arbitrator and mediator. It also gives advice to the leaders of the band.

The first nation is officially governed by a Band Council, which is elected by a customary electoral system based on section 10 of the Indian Act. The election of June 2020 re-elected Jacques Tremblay as Grand Chief, in which role he is one of five members of the Grand Council.

== History ==
In 1891, the government purchased a parcel of land at Cacouna to form the reserve Cacouna 22, the smallest Indian reserve in the country. A number of homes were built there, but it was too small for many Maliseet to settle there. The last inhabitant of the reserve was the chief Jacques Launiere who died in the 1970s.

The Viger First Nation was recognized by the government of Quebec in 1989.

== Fishing ==
At the beginning of the 21st century, the Wolastoquey of Quebec started commercial fishing operations. In 2000, the federal government granted them a permit to fish for snow crab and northern prawn. In 2006 they received a permit for exploratory fishing of green urchins, in 2006 two permits for fishing deep fish and three for whelk.

In 2009, a committee was formed to manage the commercial fishing: le Comité de gestion de l'entreprise de pêche commerciale (EPC) (committee for management of the enterprise of commercial fishing). At one point at least, over 50% of the crew of the fleet were Indigenous people of the Wolastoqiyik nation.

The development of the Wolastoqiyik fisheries contributes to the economic growth of the regions of Bas-Saint-Laurent and Gaspésie.

== Interpretive center ==
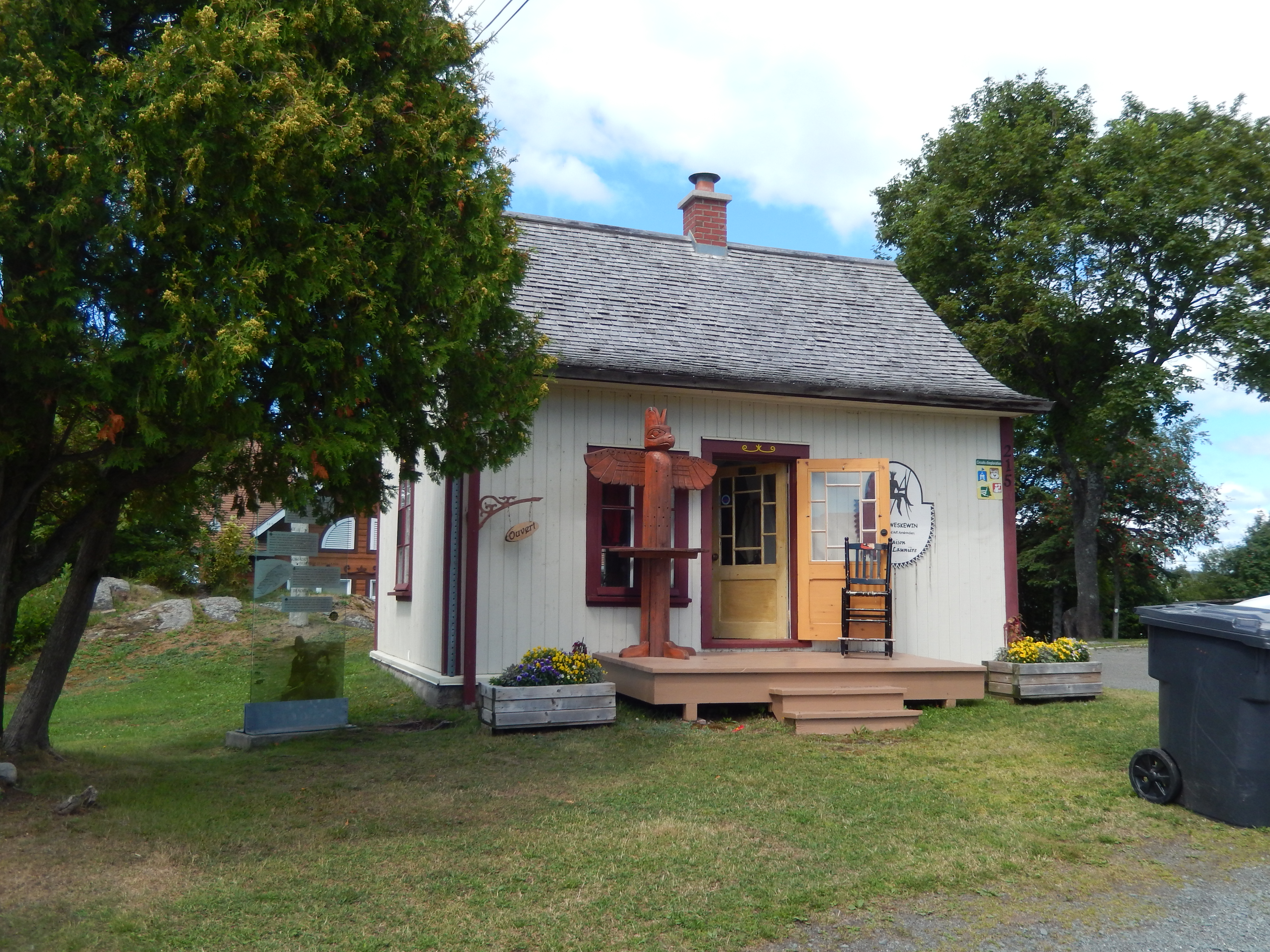
The Denis-Launière House in Cacouna, Quebec

The Denis-Launière House, built in 1871, belonged to the last chief of the Viger inhabiting the Cacouna 22 reserve. In 2000, it was transformed into an interpretation centre of the Maliseet culture. A craft shop was installed in the shed that adjoins the building.
