= Indian Island First Nation =

First Nation in New Brunswick, Canada

Coordinates: 46°41′27″N 64°47′38″W

Indian Island
- Band No. 10
- L'nui Menikuk
- People: Mi'kmaq
- Headquarters: Indian Island 28
- Province: New Brunswick

Land
- Main reserve: Indian Island 28
- Land area: 39 hectares (96 acres)

Population (November, 2026)
- On reserve: 114
- On other land: 1
- Off reserve: 105
- Total population: 220

Government
- Chief: Kenneth Barlow
- Council: Jenna Fagan; Catherine Richard (Sanipass)

Tribal Council
- North Shore Mi'kmaq Tribal Council

Indian Island First Nation (Mi'kmaq: L'nui Menikuk) is a Mi'kmaq First Nation band government located near the village of Richibucto, New Brunswick, Canada.

== Population ==
The First Nation had a total of 220 people registered as of November 2026, of which 114 lived on their own reserve.

== Governance ==
The current Chief of Indian Island First Nation is Chief Kenneth Barlow. The band is a member of the North Shore Mi'kmaq Tribal Council.

== Reserve ==
The First Nation has one reserve, Indian Island 28. The reserve has an area of 39 hectares (96 acres).

== See also ==
- List of communities in New Brunswick
- First Nations in New Brunswick
