= Madawaska Maliseet First Nation =

Madawaska Maliseet First Nation Première Nation Malécite du Madawaska Wəlastəkwewiyik Matowesekok
- Interactive map of Madawaska Maliseet First Nation; Première Nation Malécite du Madawaska; Wəlastəkwewiyik Matowesekok
- Country: Canada
- Province: New Brunswick
- County: Madawaska
- Parish: Madawaska
- Electoral Districts Federal: Madawaska—Restigouche
- Boroughs: Edmundston-Saint Basile

Government
  - Chief: Chief Patricia Bernard
  - Provincial Representatives: Jean-Claude D'Amours
  - MP: Guillaume Deschênes-Thériault

Population (2012)
  - Total: 350
- Time zone: UTC-4 (Atlantic (AST))
  - Summer (DST): UTC-3 (ADT)
- Website: Madawaska Maliseet First Nation website

Madawaska Maliseet First Nation (Malecite-Passamaquoddy: Wəlastəkwewiyik Matowesekok) or St. Basile 10 band is one of six Wolastoqiyik or Maliseet Nations on the Saint John River in Canada. The Madawaska Maliseet First Nation (MMFN) territory is in Northern New Brunswick. The MMFN reserve is located 1.6 km east of Edmundston in the north-western region of New Brunswick. The band membership has 350 people. About 114 members of the MMFN live on the St. Basile no. 10 reserve. They are part of the Saint John River Valley Tribal Council. Family names include Bernard, Cimon, Francis, and Wallace.

== History ==
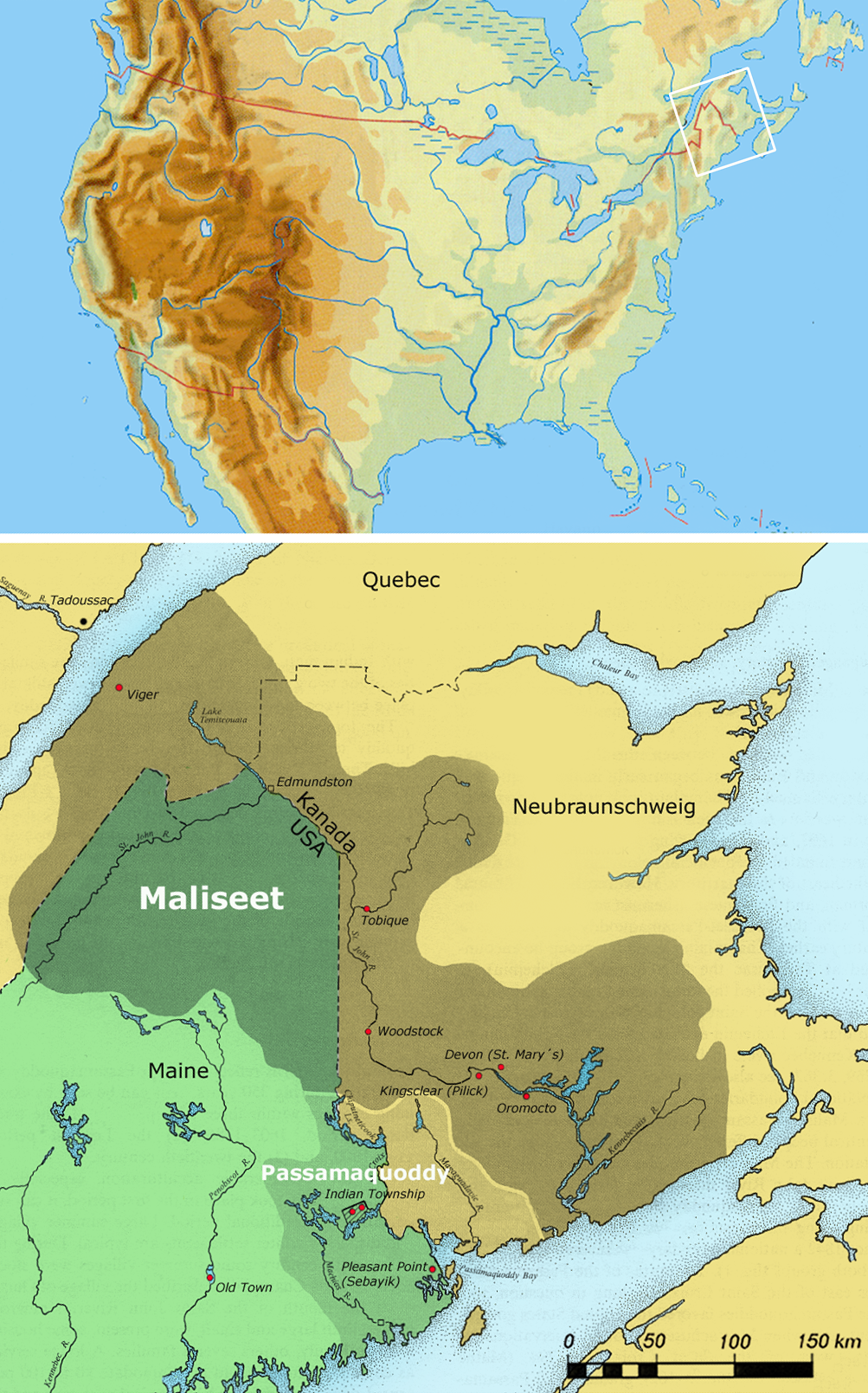
Maliseet Territory

The Maliseet also Malecite, Malécites or Étchemins, their name for themselves, or autonym is Wəlastəkwewiyik, Wolastoqiyik. Wolastoq means "Beautiful River," referring to the Saint John River. Wolastoqiyik means "People of the Beautiful River" in Maliseet. Wəlastəkwewiyik "The Maliseet People," in Maliseet. Their traditional land extended along the Wolastoq/Saint John River in New Brunswick and Maine and had once extended as far as the St. Lawrence River. They are Algonkian (Algonquian) speakers. Their lands and resources were bounded on the east by traditional lands of the Mi'kmaq and on the west by Passamaquoddy (or Peskotomuhkati) and Penobscot nations. At the time of the European encounter, the Maliseet (Wolastoqiyik) were living in walled villages and practicing horticulture (corn, beans, squash and tobacco). In addition to growing crops they subsisted from fishing, hunting and gathering fruits, berries, nuts and natural produce.

Since time immemorial, the MMFN territory was an essential camping and meeting place for the Maliseet people during seasonal migrations. By the mid-1700s, the Maliseet villages at Madawaska had become one of the largest. However, by the turn of the 19th century it had declined significantly. A large settler community had formed at Madawaska by the early 1800s, which began with the Acadians' relocation from the lower Saint John River in 1785. The French named the area Petit-Sault meaning Little Falls in French, referring to the waterfalls located where the Madawaska River merges into the Saint John River.

In the late 1880s, Canadian Pacific Railway (CPR), expropriated three parcels of reserve land. The sum of the parcel of land totaled almost 13 acres that cut through the MMFN. CPR constructed a section of a railway running from Woodstock to Edmundston. (AANDC 2008)

After the abandonment of this section of land for railway purposes around 1971, the CPR entered into an agreement with the Fraser Papers Inc. (now Twin Rivers) pulp mill, the largest pulp mill in the area. Fraser Papers Inc. constructed an above-ground pipeline running from their mill to a tailings pond on the CPR easement.(AANDC 2008).

"People couldn't go from the south to the north side of the pipeline because you know, it was on the ground…it was made of wood staves, 4 feet tall."

When the railway was abandoned the MMFN made a claim to get their land back. The claim lands are part of St. Basile no. 10 reserve, where approximately 50 percent of the 228 members of the Madawaska Maliseet First Nation are living. This reserve is located 1.6 km east of Edmundston in New Brunswick's north-western region. Non-Natives, whose land had also been expropriated for the railway, had their land returned to them.

"The Madawaska Maliseet First Nation alleged that the Government of Canada failed to protect and preserve its interest in the reserve when Canadian Pacific Railway ceased to use the land for railway purposes."(AANDC 2008).

The mill is paired with a Fraser paper mill directly across the Saint John River in Madawaska, Maine, through which liquified pulp slurry is piped - the only such installation anywhere along the Canada–United States border.

Joanna Bernard, Chief of the Madawaska Maliseet First Nation, successfully negotiated a specific land claim regarding the Canadian Pacific Right of Way, which included $5.7 million in compensation and the reserve's land being reinstated.(AANDC 2008). "This settlement relates to the use of three parcels of reserve land, totalling almost 13 acres, used by Canadian Pacific Railway for the construction of a section of a railway running from Woodstock to Edmundston in the late 1800s.

By 2012 Madawaska Maliseet First Nation also "negotiated an agreement with Twin Rivers, the new owners of Fraser Papers, allowing the company to continue to operate the pipeline on the reserve."(AANDC 2012).

"We've signed a permit and allowed the pipeline to continue to exist …it's now underground…it's no longer above ground…so the relationship continues and we try and make it a continuing positive relationship." "The Trans Canada Highway divides our First Nation and because we have the ramps now, now we are actually able to develop the other side of the highway for commercial leasing and our very first anchor tenant will be…a Shell truck stop."(AANDC 2012).

Premier David Alward announced on New Brunswick Day, 2013, that Chief Joanna Bernard was one of ten people inducted into the Order of New Brunswick. Chief Bernard was recognised "for her tireless efforts to ensure the well-being and economic prosperity of her community as well as of all First Nations communities in the province."

== See also ==
- List of communities in New Brunswick
- First Nations in New Brunswick
