= Cacouna Indian Reserve No. 22 =

First Nations reserve in Quebec, Canada

Cacouna
- First Nations reserve
- Location within Quebec
- Coordinates: 47°55′N 69°31′W
- Country: Canada
- Province: Quebec
- Region: Bas-Saint-Laurent
- RCM: None
- Constituted: unspecified

Government
  - Federal riding: Côte-du-Sud—Rivière-du-Loup—Kataskomiq—Témiscouata
  - Prov. riding: Rivière-du-Loup–Témiscouata–Les Basques

Area
  - Total: 0.00 km^{2} (0 sq mi)
- Time zone: UTC−5 (EST)
  - Summer (DST): UTC−4 (EDT)

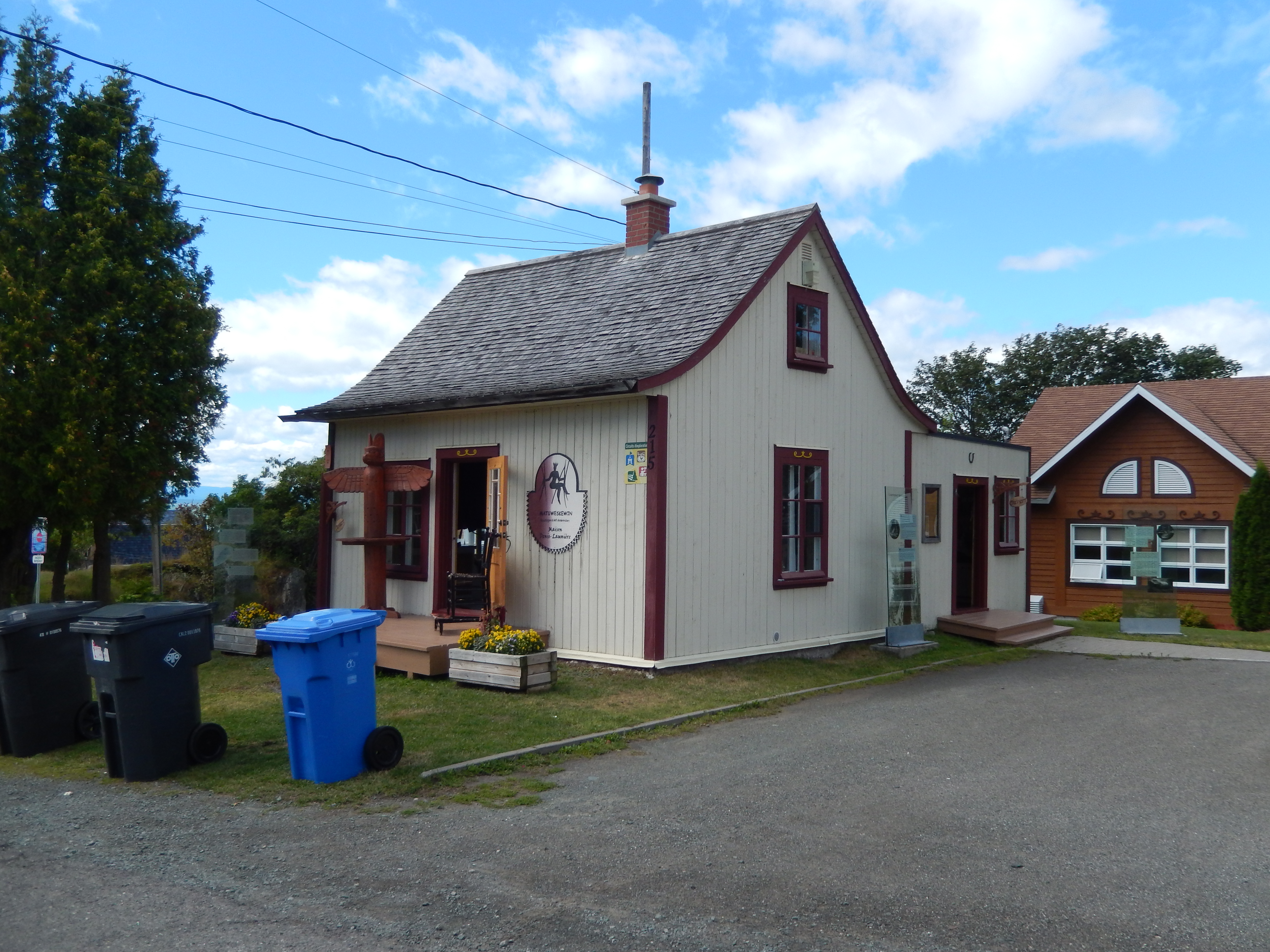

Cacouna is a Wolastoqey First Nations reserve in Quebec, physically located within the Rivière-du-Loup Regional County Municipality (though not juridically part of it). Surrounded by the Cacouna, Quebec, it is one of two reserves controlled by the Wolastoqiyik Wahsipekuk First Nation.

It is the smallest reserve in Canada, with an area of only 0.17 hectares (0.42 acres, or 18,300 square feet). It is not permanently inhabited.
