= Sarah Anala =

Canadian social worker

- Born: 26 December 1946 (age 79); Nain, Newfoundland and Labrador
- Citizenship: Canadian, First Nations: Maliseet
- Occupation: Social work
- Awards: Order of Canada, Queen Elizabeth II Diamond Jubilee Medal

Sarah Anala C.M., is a Canadian social worker, particularly with the indigenous peoples of her country (Maliseet, Inuit, Mi'kmaq).

== Biography ==
Sarah Anala was born December 26, 1946, in Nain, Labrador.

A nurse by training, she devotes her professional life to helping and supporting inmates at Dorchester Penitentiary. She gave numerous workshops in the Maritime provinces and her innovative methods succeeded in reducing the rate of recidivism among offenders. Herself of indigenous origin (Nunatsiavut Inuk) she cares about the social condition of her people as well as that of the Mi'kmaq and the Inuit. She initiates efforts for the preservation of indigenous heritage, promoting understanding and respect between whites and indigenous peoples.

== Awards ==
The importance of her work was recognized by her appointment as a Member of the Order of Canada in 1997.

She also received an Honorary Doctor of Laws degree from Memorial University of Newfoundland on May 8, 2015.

In 2017, she was one of the nominees for the Newfoundland and Labrador Human Rights Award.

A former student of an Indigenous Residential School in Canada, she was the one who greeted Canadian Prime Minister Justin Trudeau when he came to Happy Valley-Goose Bay in November 2017, to apologize from Canada to the survivors of these institutions in Labrador.

She also received the Queen Elizabeth II Diamond Jubilee Medal.

== Sources ==
- Antle, Angela (2018). "Atlantic Voice | Atlantic Voice: Inuit elder Sarah Anala" (audio). CBC Listen.
