= Fort Folly First Nation =

Coordinates: 45°53′32″N 64°29′44″W

Fort Folly
- Band No. 9
- People: Mi'kmaq
- Headquarters: Dorchester
- Province: New Brunswick

Land
- Main reserve: Fort Folly 1
- Land area: 0.561 km^{2} (0.217 sq mi)

Population (June, 2025)
- On reserve: 32
- On other land: 1
- Off reserve: 108
- Total population: 141

Government
- Chief: Rebecca Knockwood

Tribal Council
- North Shore Mi'kmaq Tribal Council

Fort Folly First Nation is a Mi'kmaq First Nation band government located near the village of Dorchester, New Brunswick, Canada.

== Population ==
The First Nation had a total of 158 people registered as of September 2020, of which 29 lived on their own reserve.

== Governance ==
The current Chief of Fort Folly First Nation is Chief Rebecca Knockwood. The Councillor of the First Nation is Jennifer Crosthwaite. The band is a member of the North Shore Micmac District Council and the Atlantic Policy Congress of First Nations.

== Reserve ==
The First Nation has one reserve, Fort Folly 1. The reserve has an area of 56.1 hectares (139 acres). This reserve came into existence in 1840, under the New Brunswick Indian Act.

== See also ==
- List of communities in New Brunswick
- First Nations in New Brunswick
