= Regional development agency (Canada) =

Federal government agencies

In Canada, the regional development agencies (RDA) are the seven federal government agencies responsible for addressing key economic challenges and furthering economic development, diversification, and job creation specific to their respective regions.

The seven agencies and their individual regions are:

- Atlantic Canada Opportunities Agency (ACOA) — New Brunswick, Newfoundland and Labrador, Nova Scotia, and Prince Edward Island
- Canada Economic Development for Quebec Regions (CED) — Quebec
- Federal Economic Development Agency for Southern Ontario (FedDev Ontario) — southern Ontario
- Federal Economic Development Agency for Northern Ontario (FedNor) — northern Ontario
- Canadian Northern Economic Development Agency (CanNor) — Yukon, Northwest Territories, and Nunavut
- Pacific Economic Development Canada (PacifiCan) — British Columbia
- Prairies Economic Development Canada (PrairiesCan) — Alberta, Saskatchewan, and Manitoba

PacifiCan and PrairiesCan are the two newest RDAs, which were announced by the Government of Canada on 5 August 2021 as the result of splitting Western Economic Diversification Canada (WD), which covered British Columbia, Alberta, Saskatchewan, and Manitoba.

The regional development agencies were brought under the Innovation, Science and Economic Development portfolio by the Mulroney government. RDAs were administered by the Minister of Economic Development and Official Languages with a Deputy Minister and Parliamentary Secretary assigned to each agency. However, in the cabinet announced by Prime Minister Justin Trudeau following the 2021 Canadian federal election, the RDAs were placed back under control of individual cabinet ministers.

== Atlantic Canada Opportunities Agency ==
Atlantic Canada Opportunities Agency

Agency overview
- Formed: 1987
- Jurisdiction: Government of Canada
- Headquarters: Blue Cross Centre, Moncton, NB
- Employees: 575 FTEs (2019–20)
- Annual budget: $346.8 m CAD (2021–22)
- Minister responsible: Sean Fraser, Minister responsible for the Atlantic Canada Opportunities Agency
- Agency executive: Laura Lee Langley, President
- Key document: Atlantic Canada Opportunities Agency Act, R.S.C. 1985, c. 41 (4th Supp.)
- Website: www.acoa-apeca.gc.ca

The Atlantic Canada Opportunities Agency (ACOA; French: Agence de promotion économique du Canada atlantique) is the Government of Canada's agency responsible for helping to create opportunities for economic growth in the Atlantic Provinces by working with the people of the region. ACOA encompasses the provinces of New Brunswick, Newfoundland and Labrador, Nova Scotia, and Prince Edward Island. ACOA offers non-repayable and repayable financial aid. Loans are unsecure and interest-free. Information on funded projects is public but specific information such as how much has been repaid is confidential.

From the 1980s to 2021, ACOA was overseen by the Minister of Economic Development and Official Languages. Historically, ACOA reported to the Minister for the Atlantic Canada Opportunities Agency, but this role was combined with other ministerial roles for regional development agencies to report to one position. In 2021, ACOA and the other RDAs returned to have a dedicated Cabinet minister, the Minister responsible for the Atlantic Canada Opportunities Agency.

In 2014, ACOA assumed responsibility for the direct delivery of economic development programs, services and advocacy in Cape Breton. Prior to 2014, a federal Crown corporation named Enterprise Cape Breton Corporation (ECBC), had a similar function to ACOA with a specific jurisdictional mandate for the whole of Cape Breton Island and a portion of mainland Nova Scotia.

Planned spending for 2015-2016 consisted of $171 million for enterprise development, $89 million for community development, $25 million for internal services, and $11 million for policy, advocacy, and coordination.

=== Atlantic Innovation Fund ===
The Atlantic Innovation Fund (AIF) is a funding program run by the Atlantic Canada Opportunities Agency to help Canadian organizations in Atlantic Canada to develop innovative products and services. This program is highly competitive. Project proposals go through an extensive external review process.

To be eligible for this program, the project must be based in Atlantic Canada, have a potential commercial value and include a large R&D component. The average funding level is about $2 million per project. Average project duration is about two years.

=== Locations ===
ACOA encompasses the provinces of New Brunswick, Newfoundland and Labrador, Nova Scotia, and Prince Edward Island. Its head office is located at the Blue Cross Centre in Moncton, NB, along with a liaison office in Ottawa.

Other offices of ACOA are located in:

- New Brunswick
  - Fredericton (regional office)
  - Edmundston
  - Miramichi
  - Grand Falls (northwest office)
  - Tracadie-Sheila
  - Campbellton
  - Saint John (Fundy region office)
  - Bathurst (northeast office)
  - Moncton (southeast office)
- Newfoundland and Labrador
  - St. John's (regional office)
  - Clarenville
  - Gander
  - Grand Falls-Windsor
  - Corner Brook
  - Happy Valley-Goose Bay (Labrador office)
  - Marystown
- Nova Scotia
  - Halifax (regional office)
  - Church Point (Annapolis/Digby office)
  - Antigonish (Antigonish/Guysborough/Pictou office)
  - Truro (Colchester office)
  - Amherst (Cumberland office)
  - Windsor (Hants/Kings office)
  - Bridgewater (Lunenburg office)
  - Port Hawkesbury
  - Shelburne (Shelburne/Queens office)
  - Sydney
  - Yarmouth
- Prince Edward Island
  - Charlottetown (regional office)

== Canada Economic Development for Quebec Regions ==
Canada Economic Development for Quebec Regions
- Développement économique Canada pour les régions du Québec

Agency overview
- Formed: 2005
- Preceding agency: Federal Office of Regional Development - Quebec
- Type: regional development agency
- Jurisdiction: Quebec
- Employees: 320 FTEs (2020)
- Annual budget: $366.5 m CAD (2021–22)
- Minister responsible: Melanie Joly, Minister responsible for the Economic Development Agency of Canada for the Regions of Quebec
- Agency executive: Sony Perron, Deputy Minister / President
- Key document: Economic Development Agency of Canada for the Regions of Quebec Act, S.C. 2005, c. 26
- Website: dec.canada.ca/

Canada Economic Development for Quebec Regions (CED; French: Développement économique Canada pour les régions du Québec; legal name: Economic Development Agency of Canada for the Regions of Quebec) is the regional development agency responsible for promoting economic expansion in Quebec by promoting small and medium-sized enterprises and non-profit economic organizations.

Before 1998, CED was called the Federal Office of Regional Development - Quebec. The agency is under the supervision of the Minister of the Economic Development Agency of Canada for the Regions of Quebec.

Under its Act, which came into effect on 5 October 2005, the object of the Agency is to promote the long-term economic development of the regions of Quebec by giving special attention to those where slow economic growth is prevalent or opportunities for productive employment are inadequate.

CED works with a network of partners, which includes: Business Development Bank of Canada (BDC), Canada Business Network, Investissement Québec, Ministère de l'Économie et de l'Innovation Québec (MEI), National Research Council Canada (NRC), and others.

The agency has offices throughout the province. The administrative regions served by CED include: Abitibi-Témiscamingue, Bas-Saint-Laurent, Centre-du-Québec, Chaudière-Appalaches, Côte-Nord, Estrie, Gaspésie–Îles-de-la-Madeleine, Lanaudière, Laurentides, Laval, Mauricie, Montérégie, Montréal, Nord-du-Québec, Outaouais, Québec, and Saguenay–Lac-Saint-Jean.

== Canadian Northern Economic Development Agency ==
Canadian Northern Economic Development Agency
Agency overview
- Formed: 2009
- Jurisdiction: Government of Canada
- Minister responsible: Rebecca Chartrand, Minister responsible for the Canadian Northern Economic Development Agency
- Agency executive: Jimi Onalik, President
- Website: cannor.gc.ca

== Federal Economic Development Agency for Northern Ontario ==
Federal Economic Development Agency for Northern Ontario

Agency overview
- Formed: 1987
- Jurisdiction: Government of Canada
- Minister responsible: Patty Hajdu, Minister responsible for the Federal Economic Development Agency for Northern Ontario
- Agency executive: Valerie Gideon, President
- Website: fednor.gc.ca

The Federal Economic Development Agency for Northern Ontario (FedNor) is a regional development agency whose mission is to address the economic development, diversification and job creation in Northern Ontario.

This is a federal administrative region that extends not only south of the French and Mattawa Rivers, but all the way to Muskoka which is just south of Ontario's administrative North. FedNor especially aids women, Franco-Ontarians, youth, and Aboriginal peoples in Ontario. While a lot of progress has been made in achieving FedNor's objectives, communities in Northern Ontario continue to face the ongoing economic challenges that necessitate a stable, long-term regional development effort.

Since the beginning of FedNor in 1987, the role in business and economic development throughout the North has grown substantially. As a result, the programs and services that FedNor offers to the communities of Northern Ontario have evolved and improved. The Minister responsible for this agency was originally called the "Minister responsible for the Federal Economic Development Initiative for Northern Ontario"

In 2020, FedNor invested over CA$122 million in 294 initiatives led by local businesses, organizations, and communities, helping to support over 7,300 jobs in Northern Ontario.

FedNor has its main offices in Sudbury, Sault Ste. Marie, and Thunder Bay; as well as offices located in North Bay, Timmins, and Kenora.

=== Controversy ===
Under prior minister Andy Mitchell, FedNor's service area was expanded to include many rural areas in Southern Ontario, including much of the Central Ontario region. In 2007, a group of politicians from Northern Ontario, including Tony Martin, Claude Gravelle and France Gélinas, called for the program to be refocused exclusively on the Northern Ontario administrative region.

Additionally there had been many calls from politicians and organizations to make FedNor an agency, separate from Innovation, Science and Economic Development Canada, like the other regional development agencies across Canada. In 2021, FedNor and the other RDAs were removed from ISED and placed under the control of dedicated cabinet ministers.

=== Programs ===
FedNor supports regional economic development, which it does through the delivery of three programs:

- Northern Ontario Development Program (NODP) — NODP was put in place to help promote economic development and diversification throughout Northern Ontario. NODP provides repayable and non-repayable contributions to not-for-profit organizations and small-and medium-sized enterprises (SMEs) for projects focussed on the following three areas: Innovation; Community Economic Development; and Business Growth and Competitiveness.
- Community Futures Program — This program helps to support 24 Community Futures Development Corporations (CFDCs), throughout Northern Ontario. CFDCs provide an assortment of different programs and services which are for assisting in the community economic development and small business growth. These programs are able to provide help in: Strategic community planning and socio-economic development; Business information and planning services; and Access to capital for small and medium-sized businesses and social enterprises. These community-based, not-for-profit organizations are staffed by professionals and are each governed by local volunteer boards of directors familiar with their communities' needs, concerns and future development priorities.
- Economic Development Initiative (EDI) — As Innovation, Science and Economic Development Canada’s main point of presence in Northern Ontario, FedNor delivers national initiatives and expanded program delivery opportunities across the region. In 2009, FedNor launched the Economic Development Initiative of the Federal Strategy for Official Languages called the Roadmap for Canada’s Linguistic Duality 2008–2013: Acting for the Future!

== Federal Economic Development Agency for Southern Ontario ==
Federal Economic Development Agency for Southern Ontario
Agency overview
- Formed: 2009
- Jurisdiction: Southern Ontario
- Headquarters: Waterloo, ON
- Employees: 238 average FTEs (2016–20)
- Annual budget: $239.5 m CAD (2020–21)
- Minister responsible: Evan Solomon, Minister responsible for the Federal Economic Development Agency for Southern Ontario
- Agency executive: Nancy Gardiner, President
- Website: feddevontario.gc.ca/

The Federal Economic Development Agency for Southern Ontario (FedDev Ontario) is the federal government agency responsible for fostering innovation and business growth in Canada's southern Ontario region, the most populous region in Canada.

Since its creation in 2009 to October 1, 2021, FedDev Ontario has invested more than $3.5 billion in over 5,000 projects working with over 63,000 organizations and businesses that have generated strong results, such as supporting nearly 190,000 jobs in the region.

With its headquarter office in Waterloo, FedDev Ontario has regional offices in Toronto, Peterborough, and Ottawa. Its area of operations is in the 37 census divisions of Statistics Canada, from Cornwall in the east to Owen Sound in the west, and from Pembroke in the north to Windsor in the south.

== Western Canada ==
=== Pacific Economic Development Canada ===
Pacific Economic Development Canada
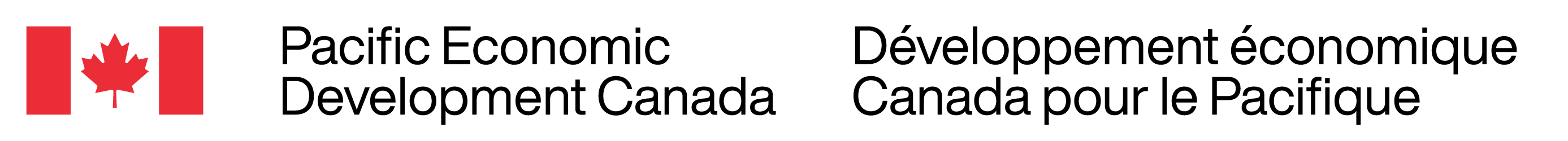

Agency overview
- Formed: 2021
- Jurisdiction: Government of Canada
- Minister responsible: Gregor Robertson, Minister responsible for the Pacific Economic Development Agency of Canada
- Agency executive: Naina Sloan, President
- Website: canada.ca/pacific-economic-development

Pacific Economic Development Canada (PacifiCan) is the federal economic development agency of the province of British Columbia.

Canada's Minister of International Development, currently Randeep Sarai, holds the title of Minister responsible for the Pacific Economic Development Agency of Canada.

The agency has offices in Vancouver, and is set to establish headquarters in Surrey with additional service locations in Victoria, Kelowna, Prince George, Cranbrook, Fort St. John, Prince Rupert, and Campbell River, as well as an office in Ottawa, Ontario.

It was created in August 2021 from splitting the Western Economic Diversification Canada into two separate agencies, the other encompassing the Canadian Prairies.

=== Prairies Economic Development Canada ===
Prairies Economic Development Canada
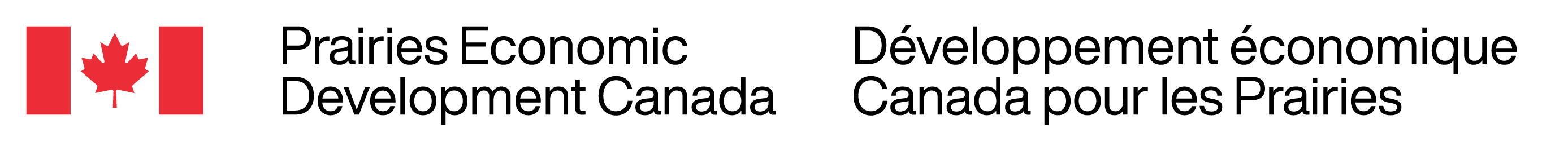

Agency overview
- Formed: 2021
- Jurisdiction: Government of Canada
- Minister responsible: Eleanor Olszewski, Minister responsible for the Prairies Economic Development Agency of Canada
- Agency executive: Diane Gray, President
- Website: canada.ca/prairies-economic-development

Prairies Economic Development Canada (PrairiesCan) is the federal economic development agency of the Canadian Prairies, which encompasses Alberta, Manitoba, and Saskatchewan. Its main priorities focus on community economic development, trade and investment, innovation, and business development.

It is headquartered in Edmonton, Alberta, with offices in Saskatoon and Winnipeg, a regional satellite office in Calgary, and a liaison office in Ottawa at the Thomas D'Arcy McGee Building. It will also be establishing new service locations in Lethbridge, Fort McMurray, and Grande Prairie, Alberta; Regina and Prince Albert, Saskatchewan; and Brandon and Thompson, Manitoba.

Canada's Minister of Northern Affairs, currently Daniel Vandal, holds the title of Minister responsible for Prairies Economic Development Canada, along with Minister responsible for the Canadian Northern Economic Development Agency.

PrairiesCan was created in August 2021 from splitting the Western Economic Diversification Canada into two separate agencies, the other encompassing British Columbia.

=== Western Economic Diversification Canada ===
Western Economic Diversification Canada
Agency overview
- Formed: 1988
- Dissolved: August 5, 2021
- Jurisdiction: Western Canada
- Headquarters: Canada Place, Edmonton, AB T5J 4H7
- Employees: 320 FTEs (2020)
- Annual budget: $343.8 m CAD (2021–22)
- Key document: Western Economic Diversification Act
- Website: wd-deo.gc.ca/

The Western Economic Diversification Canada (WD; legal name: Department of Western Economic Diversification) was a Canadian federal ministerial department concerned with the economy and economic development of Western Canada, which encompasses Alberta, British Columbia, Manitoba, and Saskatchewan.

On 5 August 2021, the Government of Canada announced that WD would be divided into two new agencies—PacifiCan for BC; and PrairiesCan for Alberta, Manitoba, and Saskatchewan.

WD operated under the provision of the Western Economic Diversification Act, which came into force on 28 June 1988. Formerly, WD was led by the Minister of Western Economic Diversification.

WD was headquartered in Edmonton, AB, and had regional offices in each of the other western provinces: Winnipeg, MB; Saskatoon, SK; and Vancouver, BC. The Edmonton office has now become the headquarters of PrairiesCan.

The Western Canada Business Service Network (WCBSN) is a group of independent organizations that receive funding from WD in order to help people in Western Canada start, grow, and expand their businesses.

The agency also released a quarterly economic publication called West at a Glance (ISSN 2561-3863).

== See also ==
- Community Futures Program of Canada
- Government of Canada
