= Kataskomiq =

- Indian reserve

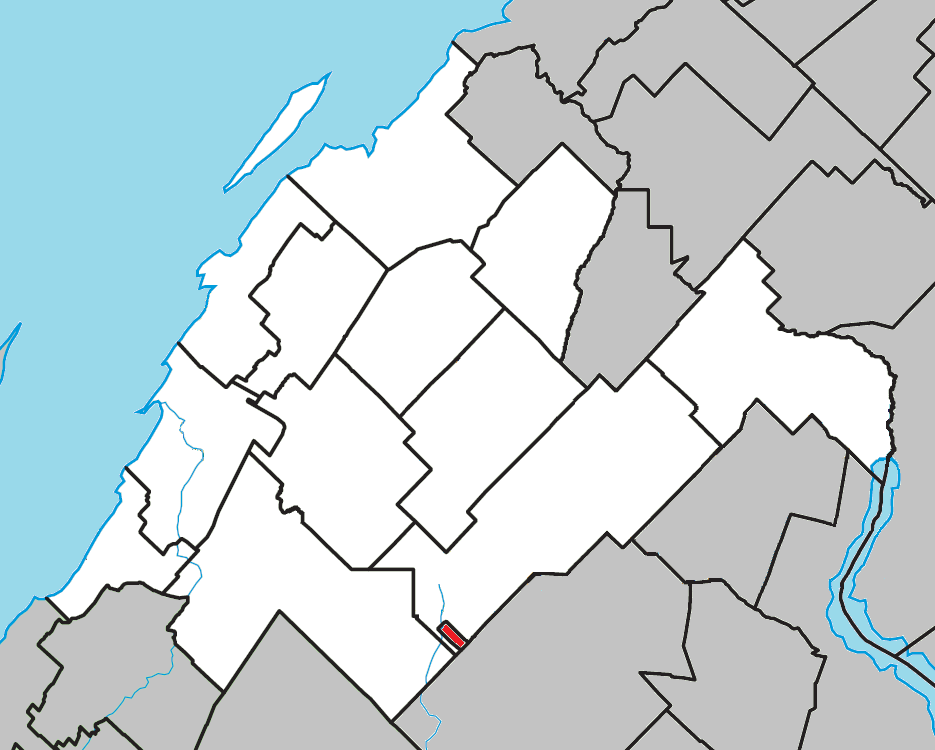
- Location within Rivière-du-Loup RCM.

- Location in eastern Quebec.
- Coordinates: 47°42′06″N 69°16′19″W
- Country: Canada
- Province: Quebec
- Region: Bas-Saint-Laurent
- RCM: None
- Constituted: unspecified

Government
  - Federal riding: Côte-du-Sud—Rivière-du-Loup—Kataskomiq—Témiscouata
  - Prov. riding: Rivière-du-Loup–Témiscouata–Les Basques

Area
  - Total: 1.60 km^{2} (0.62 sq mi)
- Time zone: UTC−05:00 (EST)
  - Summer (DST): UTC−04:00 (EDT)

Kataskomiq is an Indian reserve listed by the Canadian Geographical Names Database. The reserve belongs to the Wolastoqiyik Wahsipekuk (Viger) First Nation, Maliseet people. It is not listed by Indigenous and Northern Affairs Canada or the last two Canadian census. It is located in the Bas-Saint-Laurent region of Quebec, geographically located within the territory of Rivière-du-Loup Regional County Municipality but is not legally part of it. Its population was 0 in the 2006 Canadian census and does not appear in either the 2011 or 2016 Canadian Census. Before 2021 it was known as Whitworth.

== See also ==
List of Indian reserves in Quebec
