= Noel Bear =

Noel Bear (died 1907) was a Maliseet hunter, trapper, guide, and basket-maker who was identified by a variety of first (Noil, Newell, Newal) and last (Bair, Muin, Aubin?) names. It is known that he married in 1851 and died in 1907 on the Tobique River, New Brunswick, Canada.

Noel Bear is known to history from a petition signed by the Penobscot at Old Town, Maine in 1831. He was active during the "Aroostook War" of (1838–39) when he was a hunter for the soldiers at Fort Fairfield in Maine. He appears on census lists at the Tobique Indian Reserve beginning in 1853.
