= Pabineau First Nation =

First Nation in New Brunswick, Canada

Coordinates: 45°53′32″N 64°29′44″W

Pabineau
- Band No. 13
- Kékwapskuk
- People: Mi'kmaq
- Headquarters: Dorchester
- Province: New Brunswick

Land
- Main reserve: Pabineau 11
- Reserve: Oinpegitjoig Indian Reserve
- Land area: 447.7 ha (1,106 acres)

Population (November, 2026)
- On reserve: 32
- On other land: 2
- Off reserve: 156
- Total population: 411

Government
- Chief: Joseph Terrence (Terry) Richardson
- Council: Susan Phyllis (Motty) Ducasse; Carolyn Ann Fraser; Joseph Edmond James Richardson

Tribal Council
- North Shore Mi'kmaq Tribal Council

Website
- Pabineau First Nation

Pabineau First Nation (Mi'kmaq: Kékwapskuk) is a Mi'kmaq First Nation band government located near the village of Pabineau Falls, New Brunswick, Canada.

== Population ==
The First Nation had a total of 411 people registered as of November 2026, of which 29 lived on their own reserve.

== Governance ==
The current Chief of Pabineau First Nation is Chief Joseph Terrence (Terry) Richardson. The band is a member of the North Shore Mi'kmaq Tribal Council.

== Reserve ==
The First Nation has two reserves: Pabineau 11, with an area of 429.10 hectares (1,060.3 acres), and Oinpegitjoig Indian Reserve, with an area of 18.60 hectares (46.0 acres).

== See also ==
- List of communities in New Brunswick
- First Nations in New Brunswick
