= Oromocto First Nation =

First Nation in New Brunswick, Canada

Coordinates: 45°51′11″N 66°27′49″W

- Band No. 12
- Welamukotuk Wolastoqiyik
- People: Wolastoqiyik
- Headquarters: Oromocto
- Province: New Brunswick

Land
- Main reserve: Oromocto 26
- Land area: 106.40 hectares (262.9 acres)

Population (2026)
- On reserve: 362
- On other land: 3
- Off reserve: 570
- Total population: 935

Government
- Chief: Scott Anthony Paul
- Council: Ryan Atwin; Aspen Acacia Bear; Jason Buchanan; Megan Renee Chambers; James Garrett; Trisha Sabattis; Stefan Saulis; Dymond (Sabattis) Stevens; David (DJ) Verner

Oromocto First Nation (Malecite-Passamaquoddy: Welamukotuk Wolastoqiyik) is a Wolastoqey First Nation band government located near the village of Oromocto, New Brunswick, Canada.

== Population ==
The First Nation had a total of 935 people registered as of 2026, of which 734 lived on their own reserve.

== Governance ==
The current Chief of the Oromocto First Nation is Chief Scott Anthony Paul. The band is a member of the Wolastoqey Nation in New Brunswick and the Atlantic Policy Congress of First Nations.

== Reserve ==
The First Nation controls the Oromocto 26 reserve, which has an area of 106.40 hectares (262.9 acres).

== See also ==
- List of communities in New Brunswick
- First Nations in New Brunswick
