= Coates Mills =

Coates Mills Coates Mills
- Village
- Location of Coates Mills in New Brunswick
- Coordinates: 46°22′N 64°52′W
- Country: Canada
- Province: New Brunswick
- County: Kent
- Post office Founded: N/A
- Incorporated (Village): N/A
- Incorporated (Town): N/A
- Time zone: AST

Coates Mills is an unincorporated village in the Canadian province of Kent County, New Brunswick.

== History ==
It was named after John Coates who immigrated from England in 1810, was the first postmaster of the province. In 1904 there was 1 post office, 1 sawmill, 1 grist mill, 1 church in Coates Mills and a population of 100.

== See also ==
- List of communities in New Brunswick
