= Community Futures =

The Community Futures Network of Canada is an extensive network of 269 community futures development corporations. The national Community Futures Program is administered by four regional development agencies, the Atlantic Canada Opportunities Agency (ACOA), Canadian Economic Development for Québec Regions (CED-Q), Western Economic Diversification Canada (WD), and the Federal Economic Development Initiative for Northern Ontario (FedNor) under Industry Canada (IC). In Western Canada the Community Futures Program is delivered through a network of 90 non-profit organizations that are supported by four associations and one Pan-West Community Futures Network.

== History ==
In British Columbia, a 1980 pilot project established through the Nanaimo Community Employment Advisory Society on Vancouver Island provided the framework for what would later become Community Futures. It was the first federally funded employment project aimed at encouraging members of the local business community to participate in stimulating private sector employment. In 1983, the government created Local Employment Assistance and Development corporations in economically depressed regions across Canada. These LEAD corporations were later rolled into the Community Futures Program, which was announced in 1986 as part of the federal government's Canadian Jobs Strategy. The initial objective was to address areas "of chronic and acute unemployment which, given the economic development trends, gave the program a rural orientation"

The Community Futures program model originally consisted of two organizations, each with their own Board of Directors and a distinct mandate. One was the Business Development Centre, which provided the business support and loan functions performed by the original LEAD corporations, the second was the Community Futures Committee which was intended to assess the community's economic potential and areas of opportunity for job creation and business development. These two organizations were expected to work closely with each other.

== Governance ==
Community Futures offices operate under the guidance of a board of directors that is made up of members of the community. These boards "build trust" with the local community, as they are composed or a range of private and public stakeholders from the local community.
