= Noël Bernard (Malecite leader) =

Noël Bernard (fl. 1781–1801) was a Malecite leader in New Brunswick, Canada.
