= Fort Folly 1 =

Indian reserve in New Brunswick, Canada

Coordinates: 45°53′31.4″N 64°29′43.2″W

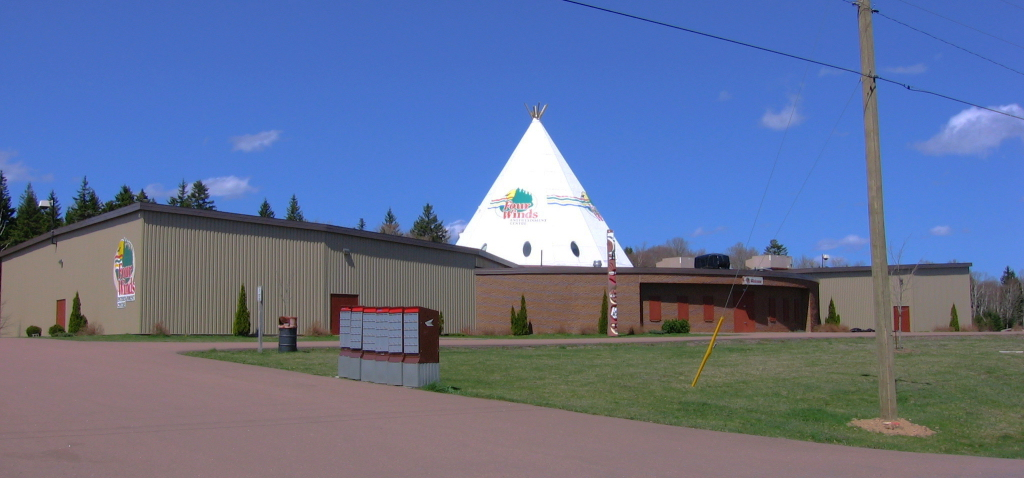
Four Winds Entertainment Centre at Fort Folly Reserve, outside Dorchester, New Brunswick.

Fort Folly 1 is a Mi'kmaq Indian reserve located near Dorchester in Westmorland County, New Brunswick, Canada.

== History ==
Fort Folly 1 is the territory of the Fort Folly First Nation. The reserve is home to the smallest Mi'kmaq community in the province. The First Nation had a total of 111 people registered as of October 2008, of which 29 lived on their own reserve, and remaining population live either on a different reserve or off the reserve. In the 2016 Census, Statistics Canada reported 40 individuals on the reserve.

The reserve has an area of 56.1 hectares (139 acres). This reserve came into existence in 1840, under the New Brunswick Indian Act. It has year-round road access. The reserve is located in the traditional territory of the people of Kwesawék Amlamkuk, which roughly translated from the Míkmaq language means "the delta where the multicoloured rivers meet". That description is based on the original location of the Fort Folly reserve at Beaumont on the Petitcodiac River.

== See also ==
- List of communities in New Brunswick
