= USS Indian Island =

Cargo ship of the United States Navy

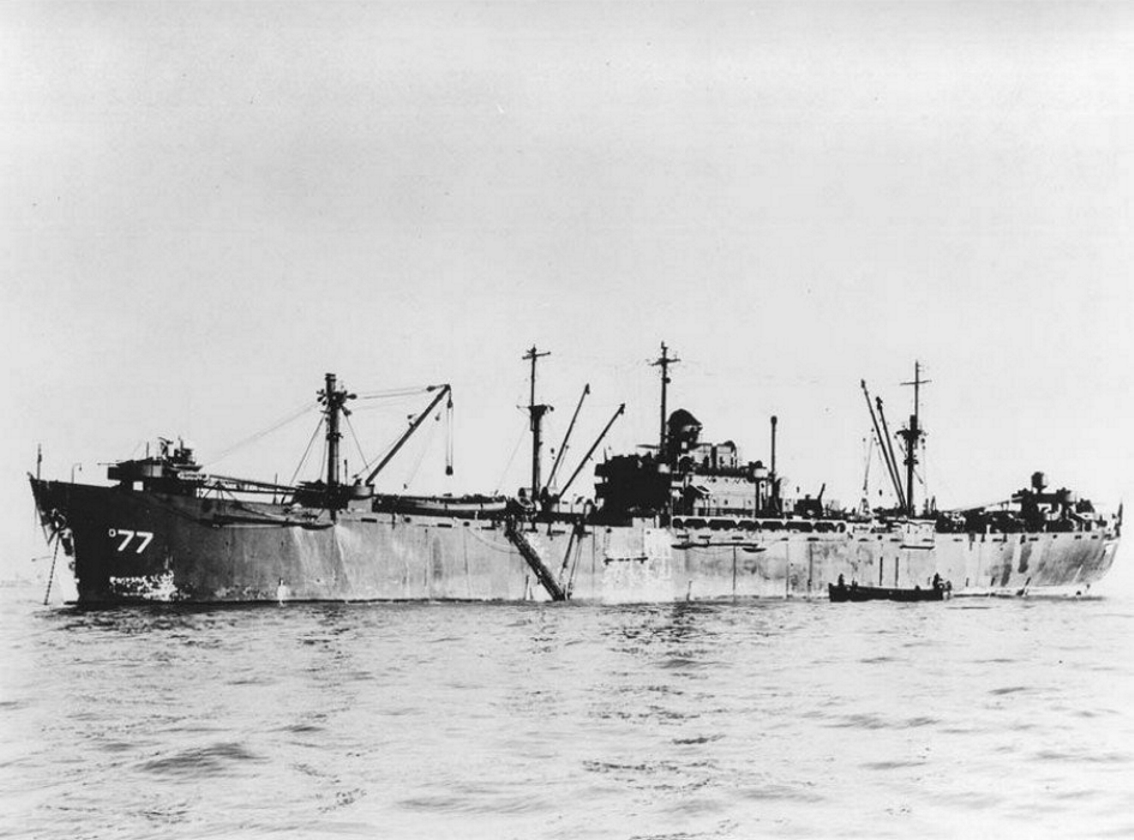
- Indian Island in December 1945

History

United States
- Name: Indian Island
- Namesake: Indian Island
- Builder: New England Shipbuilding Corporation, South Portland, Maine
- Yard number: West Yard
- Laid down: 5 November 1944 as type (EC2-S-C1) hull, (MCE hull 3088)
- Launched: 19 December 1944
- Sponsored by: Mrs. Mary H. Flaherty
- Acquired: by the Navy, 30 December 1944
- Commissioned: 27 July 1945 as USS Indian Island (AG-77)
- Decommissioned: 11 May 1947, at Orange, Texas
- Reclassified: AKS-25, 18 August 1951
- Refit: Bethlehem Steel Company, Brooklyn, New York
- Stricken: date unknown
- Fate: scrapped at New Orleans, Louisiana, in 1961

General characteristics
- Type: Basilan-class miscellaneous auxiliary
- Displacement: 5,371 tons light; 14,200 tons full load
- Length: 442 ft (135 m)
- Beam: 57 ft (17 m)
- Draft: 23 ft (7.0 m)
- Propulsion: Worthington Pump & Machinery Corp, Harrison, New Jersey, reciprocating steam engine, single shaft, 1,950hp
- Speed: 11.5 knots
- Complement: 891 officers and enlisted
- Armament: one single 5 in (130 mm) dual purpose gun mount; four single 40 mm AA gun mounts; eight single 20 mm AA gun mounts

USS Indian Island (AG-77/AKS-25) was a Basilan-class miscellaneous auxiliary acquired by the U.S. Navy shortly before the end of World War II. She was used to transport personnel and carry cargo and was inactivated and disposed of shortly after the war.

== Constructed at Portland, Maine ==
Indian Island (AG-77) was launched under U.S. Maritime Commission contract by the New England Shipbuilding Corporation, South Portland, Maine, 19 December 1944; sponsored by Mrs. Mary H. Flaherty; acquired by the Navy 30 December 1944; converted to an AG by Bethlehem Steel Company, Brooklyn, New York; and commissioned 27 July 1945.

== World War II-related service ==
After shakedown in Chesapeake Bay, Indian Island sailed for the U.S. West Coast via the Panama Canal Zone, arriving San Diego, California, 19 September 1945. She departed San Diego 27 September en route to Shanghai, China, and Sasebo, Japan, where she embarked veterans for return to the United States.

Returning to San Francisco 4 December, Indian Island departed for Orange, Texas, 14 December where she arrived 2 January 1946.

== Inactivation ==
Indian Island decommissioned at Orange, Texas, 11 May 1947 and joined the Texas Group, Atlantic Reserve Fleet. Reclassified AKS-25, 18 August 1951, Indian Island remained in the Reserve Fleet until sold for scrapping in August 1960.
