= Pabineau Falls, New Brunswick =

Coordinates: 47.5062°N 65.679402°W

Location of Pabineau Falls in New Brunswick

Pabineau Falls (Mi'kmaq: Ge'gwapsgug, lit. 'at the top of the falls') is a settlement in New Brunswick, Canada. It is the administrative office of the Pabineau First Nation band government. The Pabineau First Nation is a small Mi'kmaq community with 280 registered band members and a land base of 1,053 acres, situated approximately 8 kilometers south of the city of Bathurst, New Brunswick. The Pabineau First Nation's average on-reserve population is approximately 200 individuals. The falls themselves are a set of small rapids on the Nepisiguit River.

New Brunswick's 911 system uses Pabineau Falls only for the area north of the reserve; addresses within the reserve are listed as Pabineau First Nation.

== Geology ==
The Nepisiguit River formed during the Devonian Period, with the final closure of the Iapetus and Rheic Oceans. Material from the ocean crust rose upward and solidified near the surface as granite rocks. An age of 397 million years has been calculated for the Pabineau Falls Granite based on radiometric data. William Logan first described the granite in 1863.

== Powwow ==
The Annual Powwow is held at the "Flying Eagle Memorial Pow-wow Grounds" the first weekend of July (Saturday and Sunday). It is located on the Nepisiguit River, upriver from Bathurst.The Powwow honors the Mi’gmag heritage with traditional Aboriginal dancing, singing, arts, crafts, foods, and contemporary entertainment. Powwows are considered to be both sacred and a social event, where Aboriginal families renew their bonds and celebrate their ancestral beliefs and traditions. There is no charge for admission, parking, or camping space, and visitors are welcome.

== See also ==
- List of communities in New Brunswick
