= Buctouche 16 =

- First Nations reserve
- Location of Buctouche 16, New Brunswick
- Coordinates: 46.452982°N 64.760696°W
- Country: Canada
- Province: New Brunswick
- County: Kent

Government
  - Type: Band Council

Area
  - Land: 0.35 km^{2} (0.14 sq mi)

Population (2016)
  - Total: 96
  - Density: 272.2/km^{2} (705/sq mi)
  - Change 2011-16: ▲12.9%
- Time zone: UTC-4 (AST)
  - Summer (DST): UTC-3 (ADT)
- Area code: 506 / 428
- Median Income*: $44,672 CDN
- Median household income, 2015 (all households)

Buctouche 16 is a Mi'kmaq reserve in Canada located in Kent County, New Brunswick.

Its population in the 2016 Census was 96.

== Demographics ==
Population trend

Census	Population	Change (%)
2016	96	▲12.9%
2011	85	▲3.7%
2006	82	5.1%
2001	78	N/A

Mother tongue (2016)

Language	Population	Pct (%)
English only	75	75.0%
Other languages	15	15.0%
French only	10	10.0%
Both English and French	0	0.00%

== See also ==
- List of communities in New Brunswick
- List of Indian reserves in Canada
