= Canada Business Network =

Canada Business Network (CBN) (French: Réseau Entreprises Canada) is a collaborative arrangement among Canadian federal government departments and agencies, provincial and territorial governments, and not-for-profit entities^{1}. Its aim is to provide small and medium Canadian businesses and enterprising organizations with the resources they need to grow and prosper in a global economy, free of charge.

== Management and Governance ==
Governance of the CBN is outlined in a combination of inter-jurisdictional agreements and collaborative arrangements defining roles and responsibilities at the federal and regional level.

Federally, CBN is managed in the following configuration:

Innovation, Science and Economic Development (ISED)
- National Office

Atlantic Canada Opportunities Agency
- New Brunswick
- Nova Scotia
- Newfoundland and Labrador
- Prince Edward Island

Canada Economic Development for Quebec Regions
- Quebec

Canadian Northern Economic Development Agency
- Northwest Territories
- Nunavut
- Yukon

Federal Economic Development Agency for Southern Ontario
- Ontario

Prairies Economic Development Canada
- Alberta
- Manitoba
- Saskatchewan
Pacific Economic Development Canada
- British Columbia

== Services ==
CBN promotes entrepreneurship and innovation, and aims to reduce the complexity for entrepreneurs in dealing with multiple levels of government. On the Network's website entrepreneurs can learn how to register a business and get information on planning and managing their operations including doing market research and protecting their intellectual property. Business owners can also search for government financing programs as well as federal, provincial/territorial, and municipal permits and licences.

You can connect with the CBN various ways to receive support from regional service centres.

Services available to businesses and enterprising non-profits include (but are not limited to) seminars, business education, networking events, business advisory services, and business research services by geographic location and business sector.

== Social Media Engagement ==
CBN uses social media as an extension of its presence on the Web. In addition to weekly blogs on a variety of business topics, CBN has a presence on Twitter , Facebook , and YouTube .

== Media Mentions ==
CBN has been mentioned in the following Canadian newspaper and magazine articles:

- 10 Best Websites for Small-Business Owners, Connected for Business magazine, June 2013
- Den Dragons offer business advice, Metro News, November 2012
- 'Walking the talk' and going green pays off for Oxfam, The Globe and Mail, March 2012

== Notes ==
1. Departmental Performance Report for the period ending March 31, 2013, Industry Canada
