= Wolastoqiyik =

Indigenous people of Canada and the USA

Wolastoqiyik Maliseet
Regions with significant populations
- United States (Maine); Canada (New Brunswick, Quebec)
- Houlton Band of Maliseet Indians: 869
- Tobique First Nation: 2712
- St. Mary's First Nation: 1,822
- Madawaska Maliseet First Nation: 350
- Wolastoqiyik Wahsipekuk First Nation: 2,356

Languages
- Wolastoqey, English

Religion
- Indigenous religions, Christian denominations

Related ethnic groups
- Passamaquoddy, Mi'kmaq, Abenaki, other Algonquian peoples

- Person: Wəlastəkwew
- People: Wəlastəkwewiyik
- Language: Wəlastəkwey
- Country: Wabanaki Confederacy (Wəlastəkok); Wabanaki Confederacy (Wabanaki)

The Wolastoqiyik (Malecite-Passamaquoddy pronunciation: [wəlastəgʷijik]), also known as the Maliseet or Malecite (English: /ˈmæləsiːt/), are an Algonquian-speaking First Nation of the Wabanaki Confederacy. They are the Indigenous people of the Wolastoq (Saint John River) valley and its tributaries. Their territory extends across the current borders of New Brunswick and Quebec in Canada, and parts of Maine in the United States.

The Houlton Band of Maliseet Indians, based on the Meduxnekeag River in the Maine portion of their historical homeland, are—since 19 July 1776—the first foreign treaty allies with the United States. They are a federally recognized tribe of Wolastoqey people. Today Wolastoqey people have also migrated to other parts of the world. The Wolastoqiyik have occupied areas of forest, river and coastal areas within their 8,100,000 ha (20,000,000 acres), 320 km (200 mi) wide by 970 km (600 mi) long homeland in the Saint John River watershed.

== Name ==
The people call themselves Wəlastəkwewiyik and Wolastoqiyik'. Wəlastəkw means "bright river" or "shining river" ("wəl-" = good, "-as-" shining, "-təkw" = river; "-iyik" = people of). Wəlastəkwiyik therefore simply means "People of the Bright River" in their native language. The Wolastoqiyik have long been associated with the Saint John River, from which they draw their name. Their territory still extends as far as the St. Lawrence River. Their lands and resources are bounded on the east by the Mi'kmaq people, on the west by the Penobscot, and on the south by the Passamaquoddy, who also still speak related Algonquian languages.

Malesse'jik was a Mi'kmaq word believed to mean "He speaks slowly," or differently, and was a term that Miꞌkmaq people used to describe people from other nations. The meaning of the word today is unknown but it is commonly mistranslated to "he speaks badly, lazy, or broken". This term is the exonym by which the Mi'kmaq people referred to this group when speaking to early Europeans. The French met the Mi'kmaq people before the Wəlastəkwewiyik, and transliterated Malesse'jik to Malécite, not understanding that it was not their name. The later English colonists anglicized this term as Maliseet.

Beginning in 1758, the terms "Marichites" in French and in English "Maricheets" increased in use.

== Wolastoqey nations ==
- Maine, United States
  - Houlton Band of Maliseet Indians (Metaksonekiyak Wolastoqewiyik)
- New Brunswick, Canada
  - Bilijk First Nation (Bilijk Wəlastəkwewiyik)
  - Madawaska Maliseet First Nation (Matowesekok Wəlastəkwewiyik)
  - Oromocto First Nation (Welamoktuk)
  - St. Mary's First Nation (Sitansisk Wolastoqiyik)
  - Tobique First Nation (Wolastoqiyik Neqotkuk)
  - Woodstock First Nation (Wetstak)
- Quebec, Canada
  - Wolastoqiyik Wahsipekuk First Nation (Wahsipekuk)

== History ==
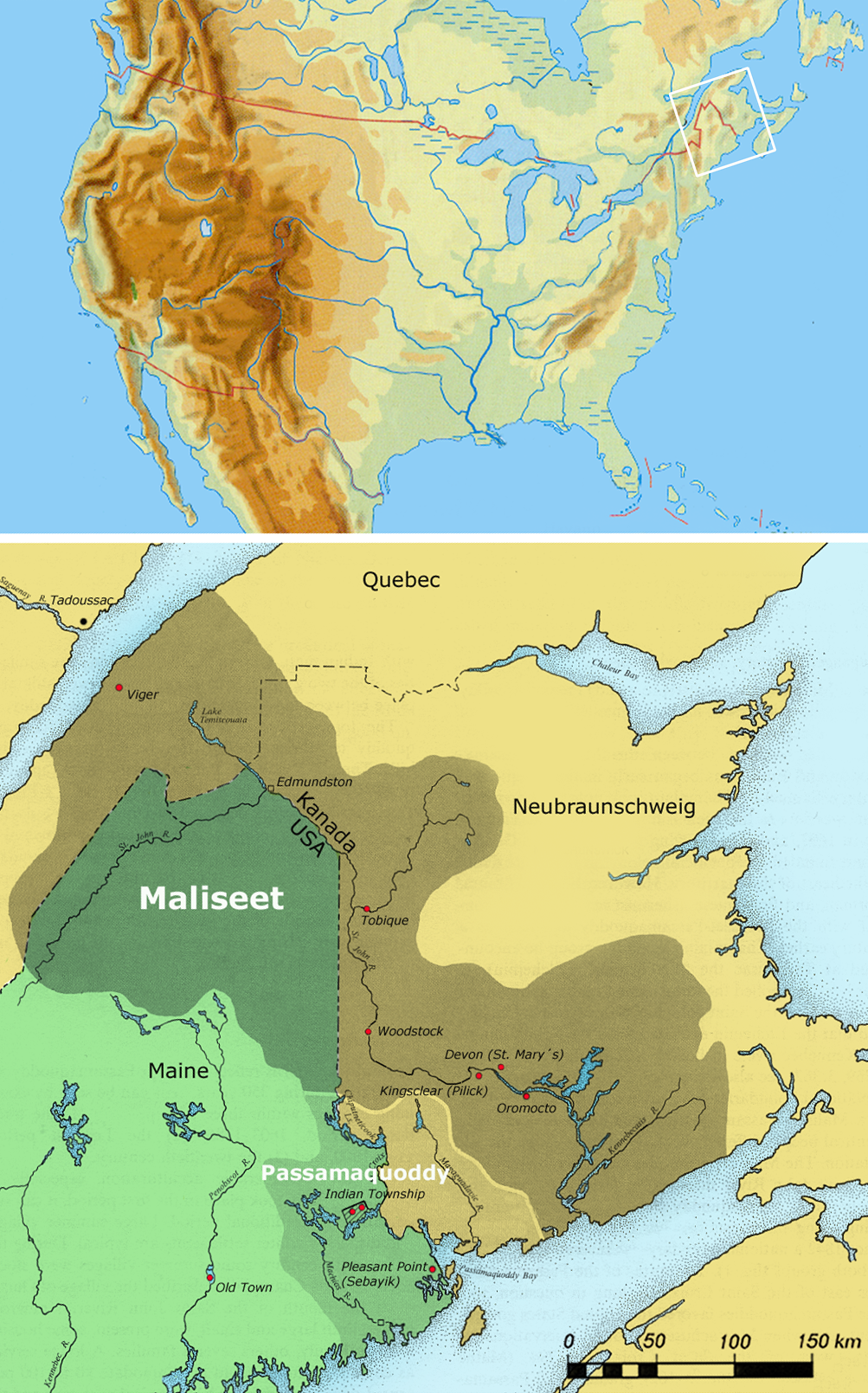
Wolastoqey territory

=== 17th century ===
At the time of European encounter, the Wəlastəkwewiyik were living in walled villages and practicing horticulture (corn, beans, squash and tobacco). In addition to cultivating and growing crops, the women gathered and processed fruits, berries, nuts and natural produce. The men contributed by fishing and hunting, and the women cooked these finds. Written accounts in the early 17th century, such as those of Samuel de Champlain and Marc Lescarbot, refer to a large Wolastoqey village at the mouth of the Saint John River. Later in the century, sources indicate their headquarters had shifted upriver to Meductic, on the middle reaches of the Saint John River.

The French explorers were the first to establish a fur trade with the Wəlastəkwewiyik, which became important in their territory. Some European goods were desired because they were useful to Wəlastəkwewiyik subsistence and culture. The French Jesuits also established missions, where some Wəlastəkwewiyik converted to Catholicism. After years of colonialism, many learned the French language. The French called them Malécite, a transliteration of the Mi'kmaq name for the people.

Local histories depict many encounters with the Haudenosaunee (Iroquois), five powerful nations based south and east of the Great Lakes, and the Innu located to the north. Contact with European fisher-traders in the early 17th century and with specialized fur traders developed into a stable relationship which lasted for nearly 100 years. Despite devastating population losses to European infectious diseases, to which they had no immunity, these Atlantic First Nations held on to their traditional coastal or river locations for hunting, fishing and gathering. They lived along river valleys for trapping.

==== Colonial wars ====
As both the French and English increased the number of their settlers in North America, their competition grew for control of the North American fur trade and physical territory. In addition, wars were carried out that reflected war in Europe. The lucrative eastern fur trade faltered with the general unrest, as French and English hostilities concentrated in the region between Quebec and Port-Royal. Increasing sporadic fighting and raiding also took place on the lower Saint John River.

In this period, Wolastoqey women took over a larger share of the economic burden and began to farm, raising crops which previously had been grown only south of Wolastoqey territory. Men continued to hunt, though with limited success. They became useful allies to the French as support against the English. For a short period during the late 17th and early 18th centuries, Wolastoqey warriors were engaged frequently in armed conflict, becoming virtually a military organization.

=== 18th century ===
With the gradual cessation of hostilities in the first quarter of the 18th century, and with the beaver supply severely diminished, fur trading declined. There was little possibility for the Wolastoqiyik to return to their traditional ways of life. Their style of seasonal, shifting agriculture on the river was curtailed by the encroachment of European settlers. All the while, the land was becoming well known to wealthy elites, who took advantage of the quality hunting and sport-fishing spots scattered throughout the province. They took all the farmland along the Saint John River, which was previously occupied by the Wolastoqiyik, displacing many Aboriginal people from more than a million and a half acres of prime land.

=== 19th century ===
The Wolastoqiyik practised some traditional crafts as late as the 19th century, especially building wigwams and birchbark canoes. They had made changes during the previous two centuries while acquiring European metal cutting tools and containers, muskets and alcohol, foods and clothing. In making wood, bark or basketry items, or in guiding, trapping and hunting, the Wolastoqiyik identified as engaging in "Indian work".

The Europeans developed potato farming in Maine and New Brunswick, which created a new market and demand for Wolastoqey baskets and containers. Other Wolastoqiyik worked in pulp mills, construction, nursing, teaching and business. With evidence that many Wolastoqiyik suffered widespread hunger and were wandering, government officials established the first Indian reserves at The Brothers, Oromocto, Fredericton, Kingsclear, Woodstock, Tobique, Madawaska (pre-1800s), and Cacouna.

Silas Tertius Rand was a linguist missionary who translated some Bible selections into Wolastoqey which were published in 1863 and then the Gospel of John in 1870.

=== 20th century ===
The Wolastoqiyik of New Brunswick struggled with problems of unemployment and poverty common to Indigenous people elsewhere in Canada, but they have evolved a sophisticated system of decision making and resource allocation. They support community enterprises in economic development, scouting and sports. Some are successful in middle and higher education and have important trade and professional standings; individuals and families are prominent in Indigenous and women's rights; and others serve in provincial and federal native organizations, in government and in community development. There were 4,659 registered Wolastoqiyik in 1996.

== Culture ==
The customs and language of the Wolastoqiyik are very similar to those of the neighbouring Passamaquoddy (Peskotomuhkati). They are also close to those of the Algonquian-speaking Mi'kmaq and Penobscot peoples.

The Wəlastəkwewiyik differed from the Mi'kmaq by pursuing a partial agrarian economy. They also overlapped territory with neighbouring peoples. The Wəlastəkwewiyik and Passamaquoddy languages are similar enough that linguists consider them slightly different dialects of the same language. Typically they are not differentiated for study.

In 1907, Natalie Curtis collected and published two traditional Wolastoqey songs: a dance song and a love song. As transcribed by Curtis, the love song demonstrates a meter cycle of seven bars and switches between major and minor tonality.

Many other songs were recorded by anthropologist William H. Mechling, whose wax cylinder recordings of Wolastoqey songs are held by the Canadian Museum of History. Many of these songs were lost to the community, as the pressures to assimilate into mainstream Canadian culture led the Wolastoqiyik to stop passing their songs on to youth; in the 2010s, however, Wolastoqew musician Jeremy Dutcher undertook a project of listening to the wax cylinder recordings and reviving the songs. His album Wolastoqiyik Lintuwakonawa was released in 2018, and won the 2018 Polaris Music Prize.

=== Ethnobotany ===
The Wolastoqiyik use the balsam fir tree (Abies balsamea) in many ways. Its juice is a laxative, its pitch is medical, and an infusion of its bark, sometimes mixed spruce and tamarack bark, can treat gonorrhea. They have used the fir's needles and branches as pillows and bedding, the roots as thread, and its pitch to waterproof seams in canoes.

== Current situation ==
Today, in New Brunswick, there are approximately 7,700 Wolastoqiyik with status in the Madawaska, Tobique, Woodstock, Bilijk, Saint Mary's and Oromocto First Nations. There are also 1,700 in the Houlton Band in Maine, and 1,200 in the Wolastoqiyik Wahsipekuk First Nation in Quebec. The Brothers 18 is a reserve made up of two islands in the Kennebecasis River; they are uninhabited but available for hunting and fishing.

About 650 native speakers of Wolastoqey remain, and about 500 of Passamaquoddy, living on both sides of the border between New Brunswick and Maine. Most are older, although some young people have begun studying and preserving the language. An active program of scholarship on the Wolastoqey-Passamaquoddy language takes place at the Mi'kmaq-Wolastoqey Centre at the University of New Brunswick, in collaboration with the native speakers. David Francis Sr., a Passamaquoddy elder living in Sipayik (Passamaquoddy Pleasant Point Reservation), Maine, has been an important resource for the program. The institute has the goal of helping Native American students master their native languages. Philip LeSourd, a linguist, has done extensive research on the language.

The Houlton Band of Maliseet was invited to take a nonvoting seat in the Maine Legislature, starting with the 126th Legislature in 2013. Henry John Bear, a treaty rights educator, tribal lawyer, fisherman and forester, was elected by his people to this seat.

There have been centuries of intermarriage between the Wolastoqiyik and European colonists and settlers. Surnames associated with Wolastoqey ancestry include: Denis, Sabattis, Gabriel, Saulis, Atwin, Launière, Athanase, Nicholas, Brière, Bear, Ginnish, Jenniss, Solis, Vaillancourt, Wallace, Paul, Polchies, Tomah, Sappier, Perley, Aubin, Francis, Sacobie, Nash, Meuse. Also included are DeVoe, DesVaux, DeVou, DeVost, DeVot, DeVeau.

The Wolastoqiyik own the Kataskomiq reserve.

== Notable Wolastoqiyik ==
- Gabriel Acquin was the founder of the reserve created in 1867, which is now part of St. Mary's First Nation.
- Sarah Anala, social worker, awardee of the Order of Canada and the Queen Elizabeth II Diamond Jubilee Medal
- Noel Bear, active during the Aroostook War of (1838–39)
- Noël Bernard, Wolastoqew leader; fl. 1781–1801
- Jeremy Dutcher, musician, winner of the 2018 Polaris Music Prize for his album Wolastoqiyik Lintuwakonawa
- Shayne Michael, poet
- Graydon Nicholas was the Lieutenant Governor of New Brunswick, Canada, from 2009 to 2014. In this Viceregal position he acted as the Queen's representative in the province.
- Sandra Lovelace Nicholas, a Wolastoqew activist, is known for challenging discriminatory provisions of the Indian Act in Canada, which deprived Indigenous women of their status when they married non-Indigenous men. It imposed a patriarchal idea of descent and identity on peoples who traditionally had matrilineal kinship systems, whereby children belonged to the mother's people and took their social status from her family. Nicholas was instrumental in bringing the case before the United Nations Commission on Human Rights and lobbying for the 1985 legislation which reinstated some rights of First Nation women and their children in Canada via Bill C31 (1985). Retaining Indigenous status for future generations is still an issue for the Wolastoqiyik and all Indigenous groups. Nicholas was appointed to the Senate of Canada on September 21, 2005
- Peter Lewis Paul was a Wolastoqew oral historian (1902–1989) who lived on the Woodstock Reserve in New Brunswick on the Saint John River. He shared information with numerous academic linguists, ethnohistorians, and anthropologist. The recipient of many honours, he was awarded a Centennial Medal in 1969, received an honorary Doctor of Law degree from the University of New Brunswick, and the Order of Canada in 1987.
- David Slagger represented the Wolastoqey people to the Maine House of Representatives

== Maps ==
Maps showing the approximate locations of areas occupied by members of the Wabanaki Confederacy (from north to south)
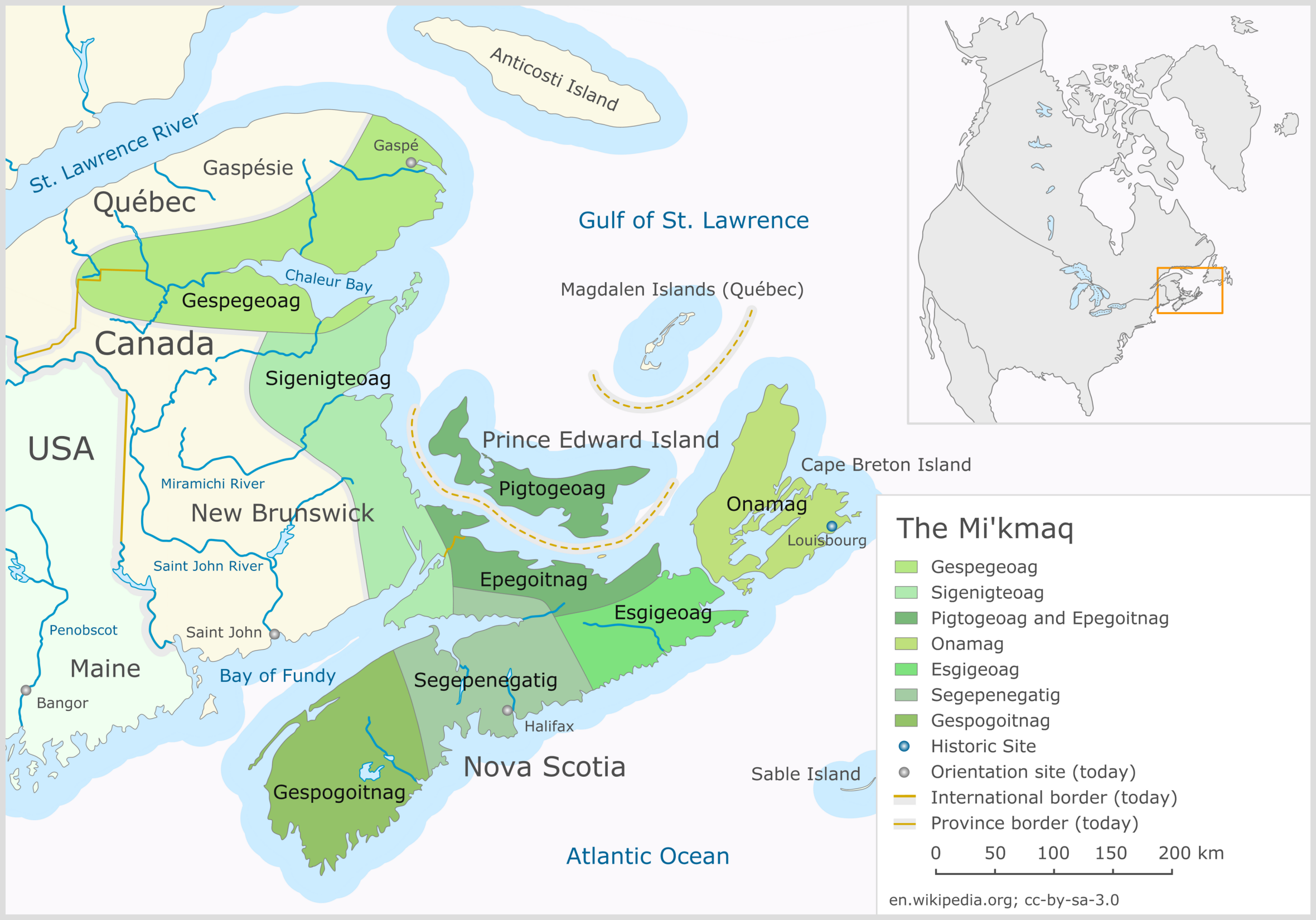
Mi'kmaq

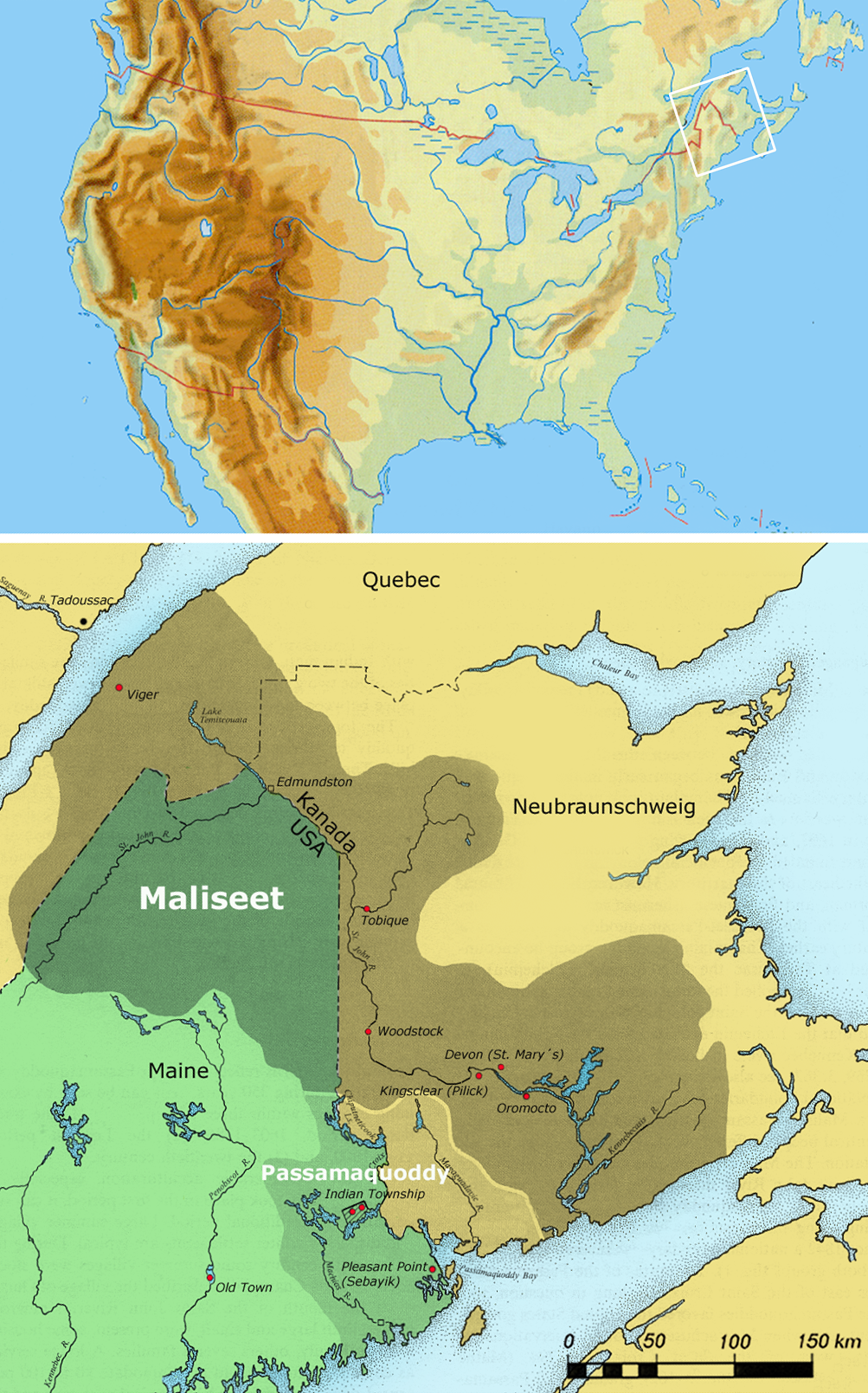
Wolastoqiyik, Passamaquoddy

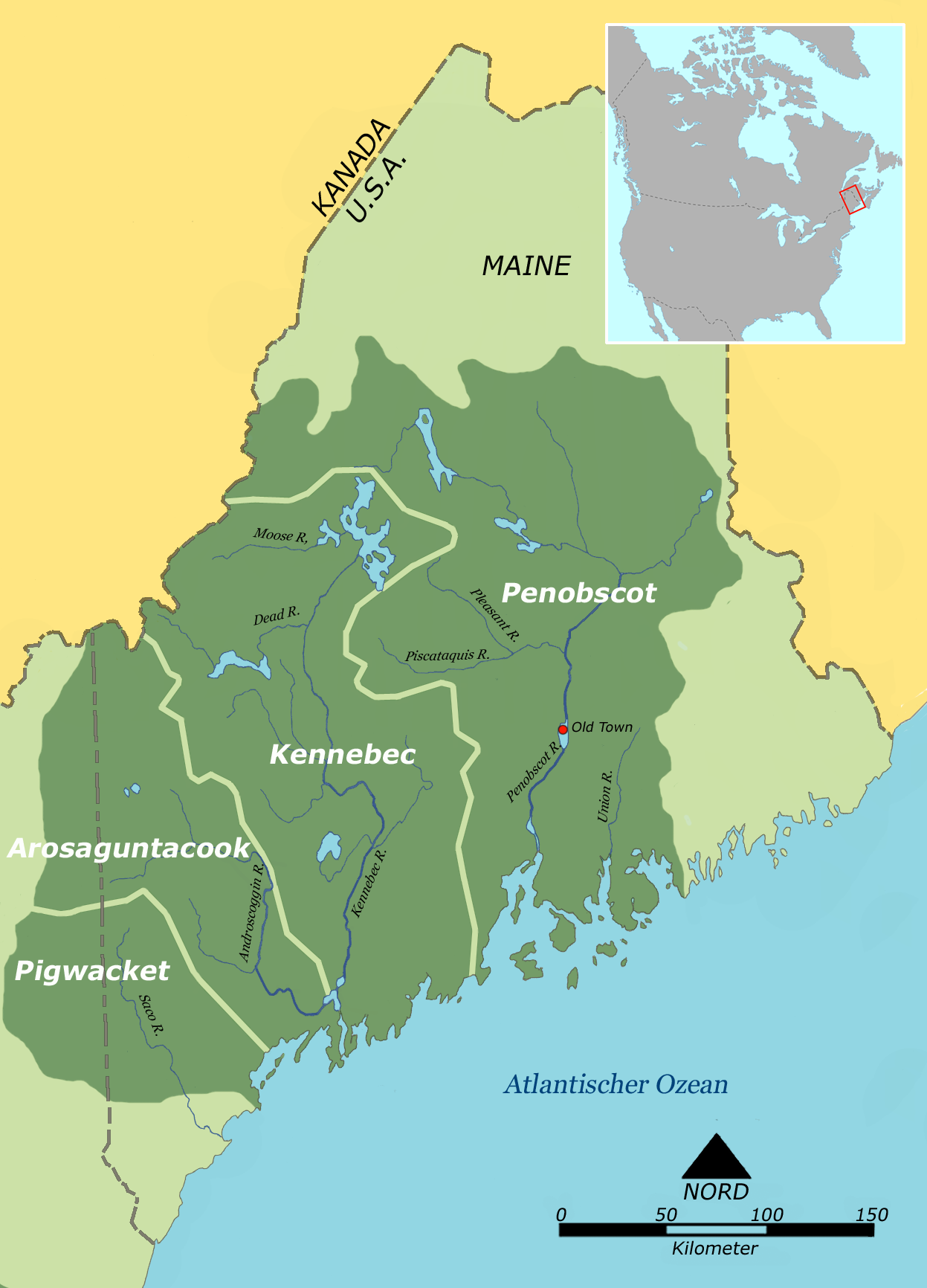
Eastern Abenaki: Penobscot, Norridgewock (Kennebec), Arosaguntacook, Pequawket (Pigwacket)

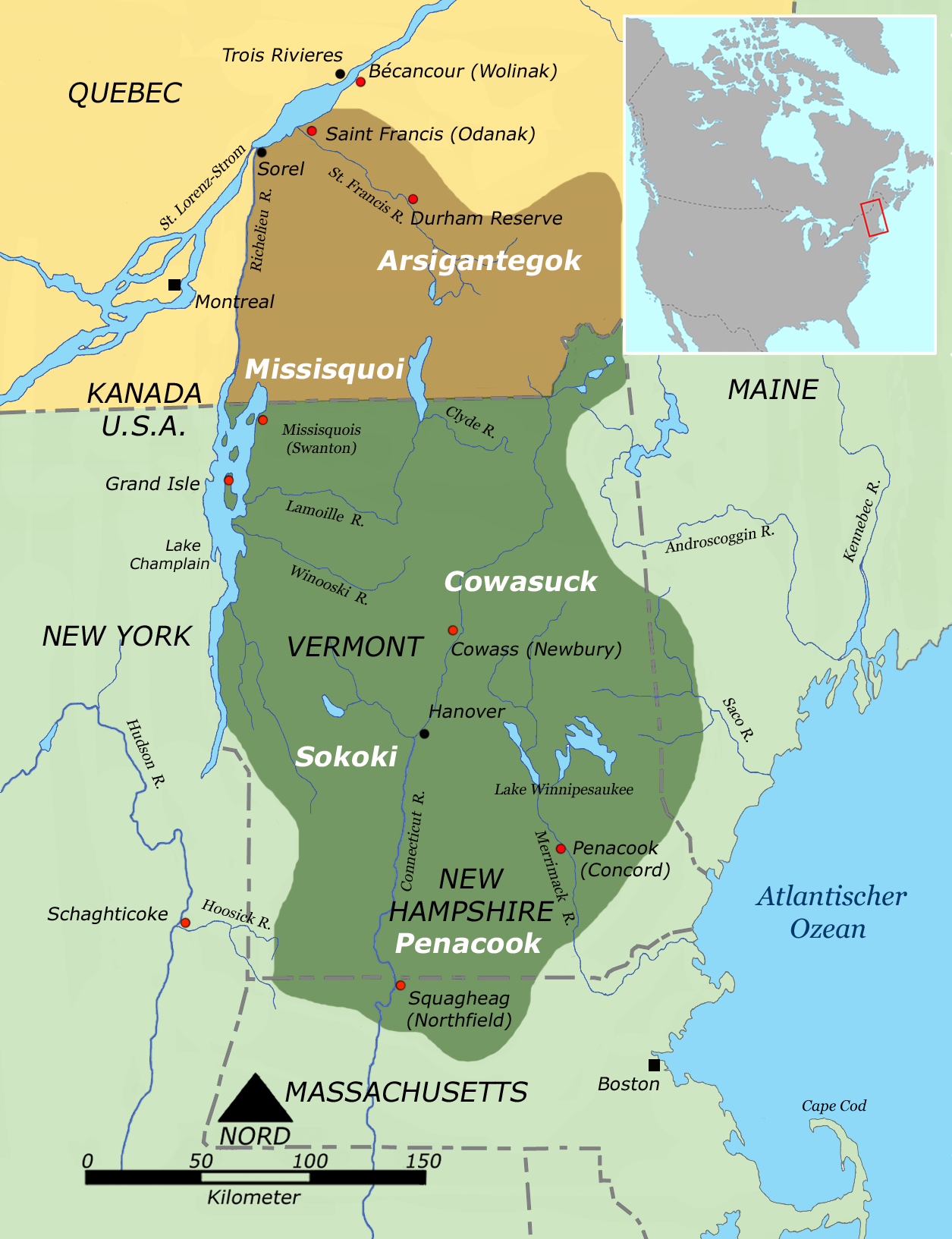
Western Abenaki: Arsigantegok, Missiquoi (Sokoki), Cowasuck, Pennacook

== See also ==
- Algonquian peoples
- Missisquoi Abenaki Tribe, not federally recognized as a Native American tribe in Vermont who claim descent from the Missiquoi
