= Indian Island 28 =

Indian Island L'nui Menikuk
- First Nations reserve
- Location of Indian Island, New Brunswick
- Coordinates: 46.69°N 64.79°W
- Country: Canada
- Province: New Brunswick
- County: Kent
- Parish: Richibucto

Government
  - Type: Band Council

Area
  - Land: 0.28 km^{2} (0.11 sq mi)

Population (2016)
  - Total: 138
  - Density: 490.1/km^{2} (1,269/sq mi)
  - Change 2011-16: ▲42.3%
- Time zone: UTC-4 (AST)
  - Summer (DST): UTC-3 (ADT)
- Postal code(s): E4W
- Area code: 506 / 428
- Dwellings: 56
- Median Income*: $47,488 CDN
- Median household income, 2015 (all households)

Indian Island 28 is a Mi'kmaq First Nation reserve on Indian Island in Canada located in Kent County, New Brunswick. It is controlled by the Indian Island First Nation.

Its population in the 2016 Census was 138.

== Demographics ==
Population trend

Census	Population	Change (%)
2016	138	▲42.3%
2011	97	0.0%
2006	97	0.0%
2001	97	▲86.5%
1996	52	▼1.9%
1991	53	N/A

Mother tongue (2016)

Language	Population	Pct (%)
English only	75	55.6%
Mi'kmaq	55	40.7%
French only	5	3.70%
Both English and French	0	0.00%

== See also ==
- List of communities in New Brunswick
- List of Indian reserves in Canada
- List of islands of New Brunswick
- Indian Island First Nation website
