= The Brothers 18 =

- First Nations reserve
- Interactive map of The Brothers 18
- Location of Indian Island, New Brunswick
- Coordinates: 45°18′31″N 66°06′46″W
- Country: Canada
- Province: New Brunswick
- County: Saint John
- Established: September 19, 1838

Government
  - Type: Band Council

Area
  - Land: 0.04 km^{2} (0.015 sq mi)
- Time zone: UTC-4 (AST)
  - Summer (DST): UTC-3 (ADT)
- Postal code(s): E4W
- Area code: 506 / 428

The Brothers refers to a group of three small islands in the mouth of the Kennebecasis River, just north from Millidgeville in Saint John, New Brunswick. Also known as The Brothers Islands Indian Reserve #18, the islands, individually known as Indian Island, Goat Island and Burnt Island, were a Wolastoqiyik reserve when they were returned the islands in the 1830s. The islands are now part of Saint John.

== History ==
The Brothers Islands Indian Reserve #18 was a Wolastoqiyik First Nation reserve in Canada located upon a group of small islands in the mouth of the Kennebecasis River in Saint John County, New Brunswick. The reserve was first returned to the Wolastoqiyik on September 19, 1838, and it quickly became a busy settlement where Wolastoqey families cleared land, cultivated crops, built homes, and accessed other resources. The reserve is presently composed of two islands and has an area of about 10 acres, however, an 1842 report from The Royal Gazette mentions there being a reserve known as the "Brothers", consisting of three islands and encompassing 15 acres in total.

== See also ==
- List of communities in New Brunswick
- List of Indian reserves in Canada
