= Saint-Louis Parish =

Saint-Louis St. Louis
- Parish
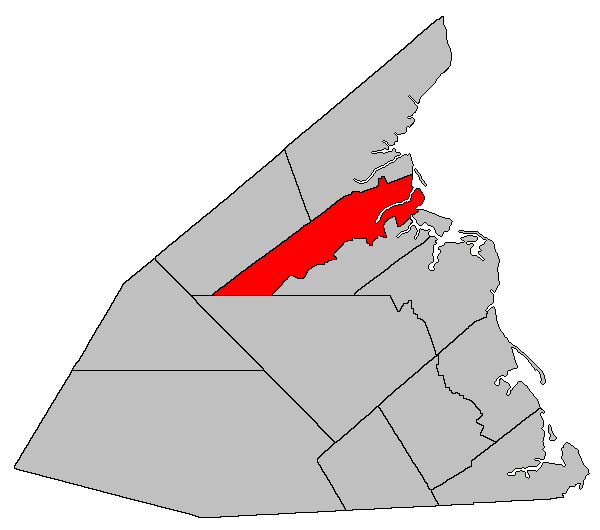
- Location within Kent County, New Brunswick.
- Coordinates: 46.725°N 65.075°W
- Country: Canada
- Province: New Brunswick
- County: Kent
- Erected: 1855

Area
  - Land: 258.65 km^{2} (99.87 sq mi)

Population (2021)
  - Total: 1,760
  - Density: 6.8/km^{2} (18/sq mi)
  - Change 2016-2021: ▼2.3%
  - Dwellings: 797
- Time zone: UTC-4 (AST)
  - Summer (DST): UTC-3 (ADT)
- Figures do not include portion within the village of Saint-Louis de Kent

Saint-Louis (originally Palmerston) is a geographic parish in Kent County, New Brunswick, Canada. (Note: The Territorial Division Act divides the province into 152 parishes, the cities of Saint John and Fredericton, and one town of Grand Falls. The Interpretation Act clarifies that parishes include any local government within their borders.)

For governance purposes it is divided between the town of Beaurivage and the Kent rural district, both of which are members of the Kent Regional Service Commission. The rural district areas are Kouchibouguac National Park in the east and the western end of the parish.

Prior to the 2023 governance reform, the parish was divided between the local service districts of Saint-Ignace and the parish of Saint-Louis, which included an area with amended services named Canisto Road.

== Origin of name ==
The parish may take its name from the Roman Catholic ecclesiastical parish of Saint-Louis-des-Français.

== History ==
Saint-Louis was erected as Palmerston Parish in 1855 from Carleton Parish. The Saint-Charles River formed the southern boundary of the parish.

In 1857 the northern boundary with Carleton in the eastern end of the parish was altered to run along grant lines.

In 1866 the parish was renamed Saint-Louis.

In 1909 the southern part of Saint-Louis was included in the new parish of Saint-Charles, using the rear line of grants along the Kouchibouguacis River to form much of the boundary.

== Boundaries ==
Saint-Louis Parish is bounded:

- on the west and north by a line beginning on the shore of Kouchibouguac Bay at the prolongation of the southern line of a grant about 1.5 kilometres south of the mouth of Ruisseau des Major in Kouchibouguac National Park, then running southwesterly along the grant line and its prolongation past Ruisseau des Major to the southernmost corner of the second grant, then northerly to the southern line of a grant straddling the Kouchibouguac River, then along the southern lines of five river grants until it strikes the prolongation of the starting grant line, then westerly along the prolongation to Route 134, then northwesterly along Route 134 to the southern line of Kouchibouguac River grants, then southwesterly along the northern line of two grants on either side of Route 11 and a third grant, to the northwestern corner of the third grant, then south seventy-five degrees and thirty minutes west (Note: By the magnet of 1857, when declination in the area was between 21º and 22º west of north.) to the northern line of Weldford Parish, at a point about 3.25 kilometres west of Route 126;
- on the east by Kouchibouguac Bay and Saint-Louis Bay;
- on the southeast by a line beginning on the shore of Kouchibouguac Bay at the prolongation of the rear line of grants on the Saint-Charles River, then southwesterly along the line to near Route 134, then generally westerly along the rear line of grants along the Kouchibouguacis River until the prolongation of the Canadian National Railway line where it crosses the northern line of Weldford Parish, which runs due west from the northernmost corner of the Richibucto 15 Indian reserve;
- on the south by the northern line of Weldford Parish;
- including the islands in front in Saint-Louis Bay and Kouchibouguac Bay.

== Communities ==
Communities at least partly within the parish; bold indicates an incorporated municipality; italics indicate a name no longer in official use

- Bretagneville
- Camerons Mill
- Cap-de-Saint-Louis (St. Louis Cape)
- Desherbiers
- Guimond-Village (Guimond)

- Petit-Large
- Pont-du-Milieu
- Saint-Ignace
- **Saint-Louis-de-Kent**
- Saint-Olivier (Saint-Oliver)

== Bodies of water ==
Bodies of water (Note: Not including brooks, ponds or coves.) at least partly in the parish:

- Rivière aux Masquis
- Kouchibouguacis River
- Lac à Jos-Wilfrid
- Baie de Saint-Louis
- Saint-Louis Narrows

== Conservation areas ==
Parks, historic sites, and related entities in the parish.

- Kouchibouguac National Park

== Demographics ==
=== Population ===
Parish population does not include the village of Saint-Louis-de-Kent **Population trend**

Census	Population	Change (%)
2016	1,802	▲3.5%
2011	1,741	▼8.4%
2006	1,901	▼0.3%
2001	1,906	▼5.6%
1996	2,018	▼1.6%
1991	2,051	N/A

=== Language ===
**Mother tongue (2016)**

Language	Population	Pct (%)
French only	1,605	88.9%
English only	160	8.9%
Both English and French	25	1.4%
Other languages	15	0.8%

== See also ==
- List of parishes in New Brunswick
