= Kent North =

Provincial electoral district in New Brunswick, Canada

New Brunswick electoral district
- The riding of Kent North (as it exists from 2023) in relation to other New Brunswick electoral districts
- Coordinates: 46.680°N 65.238°W

Provincial electoral district
- Legislature: Legislative Assembly of New Brunswick
MLA
Pat Finnigan
Liberal
- District created: 1973
- First contested: 1974
- Last contested: 2024

Demographics
- Population (2011): 15,720
- Electors (2013): 11,811
- Census division(s): Kent County, Northumberland County
- Census subdivision(s): Richibucto, Nouvelle-Arcadie, Saint-Louis-de-Kent, Saint-Louis Parish, Acadieville Parish, Carleton Parish, Harcourt, Saint-Charles Parish, Five Rivers, Elsipogtog First Nation, Richibucto-Village

Kent North (French: Kent-Nord) is a provincial electoral district for the Legislative Assembly of New Brunswick, Canada.

The district was established in the 1973 redistribution which saw New Brunswick move from a system of plurality-at-large voting (with multi-member ridings) to a first-past-the-post voting system (with single-member ridings). It took the northern third of the former three-member district for Kent County. In the 1994 redistribution, it added the Rogersville area from Northumberland County and was renamed Rogersville-Kouchibouguac. In the 2006 redistribution, it lost minor territory to Kent, but it regained that territory in 2013 as well as additional territory in the Five Rivers and Elsipogtog areas. Following the 2013 changes, it returned to its original name of Kent North.

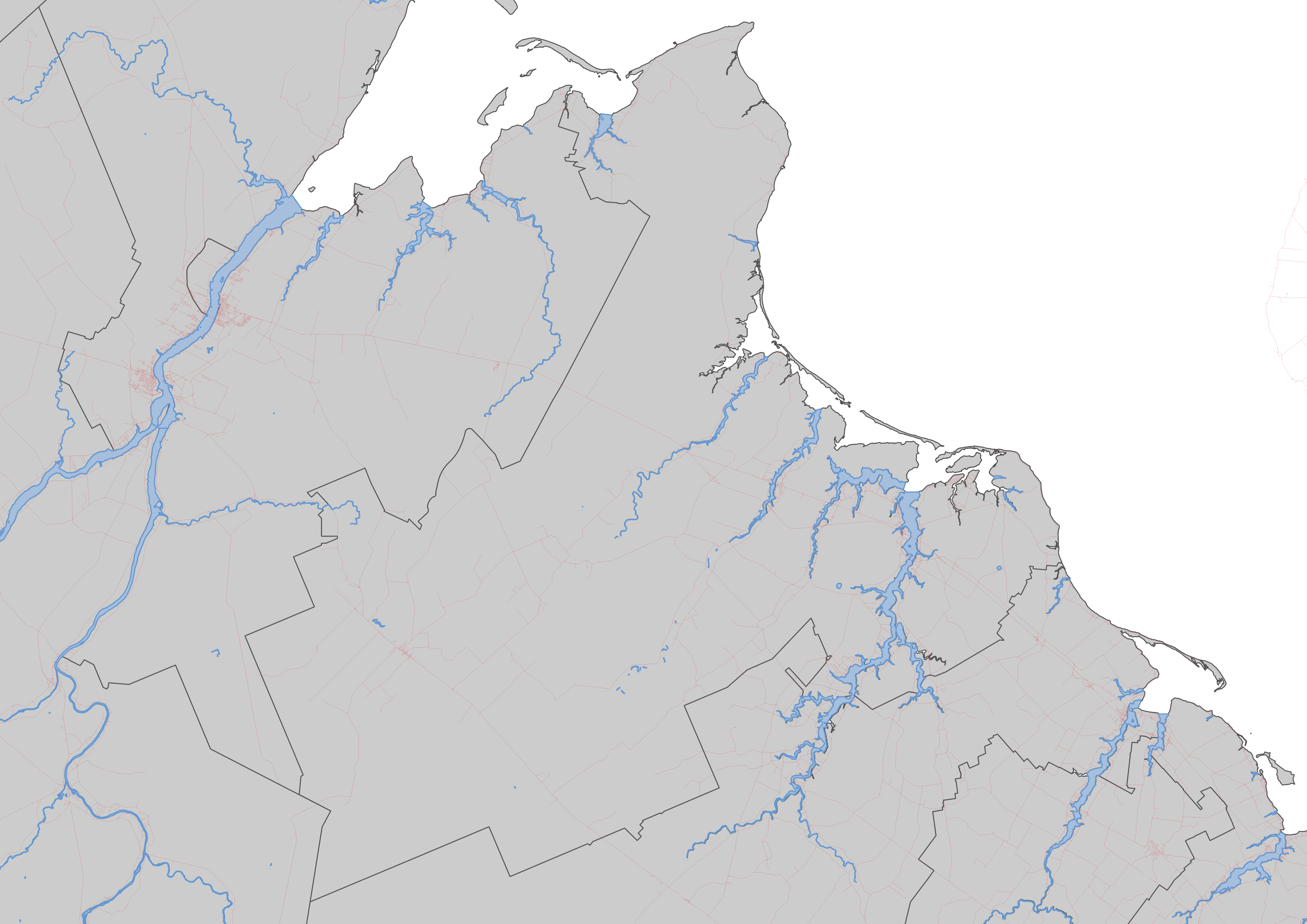
Kent North (as it exists from 2023) and the roads in the riding

== Members of the Legislative Assembly ==
Assembly	Years	Member	Party
Kent North; Riding created from Kent
48th	1974–1978	Joseph Daigle	Liberal
49th	1978–1982	Joseph Daigle	Liberal
50th	1982–1987	Conrad Landry	Liberal
51st	1987–1991	Conrad Landry	Liberal
52nd	1991–1995	Conrad Landry	Liberal
Rogersville-Kouchibouguac
53rd	1995–1999	Kenneth Johnson	Liberal
54th	1999–2003	Rose-May Poirier	Progressive Conservative
55th	2003–2006	Rose-May Poirier	Progressive Conservative
56th	2006–2010	Rose-May Poirier	Progressive Conservative
57th	2010–2014	Bertrand LeBlanc	Liberal
Kent North
58th	2014–2018	Bertrand LeBlanc	Liberal
59th	2018–2020	Kevin Arseneau	Green
60th	2020–2024	Kevin Arseneau	Green
61st	2024–Present	Pat Finnigan	Liberal

== Electoral history ==
=== Kent North (2014–present) ===
2024 New Brunswick general election
** Preliminary results — Not yet official **
Party	Candidate	Votes	%	±%
Liberal	Pat Finnigan	3,928	44.81	+9.0
Green	Kevin Arseneau	3,251	37.09	-5.9
Progressive Conservative	Carl Cosby	1,441	16.44	-2.2
People's Alliance	Carole Boudreau	145	1.65	+1.1
Total valid votes		8,765	99.72	
Total rejected ballots		25	0.28	
Turnout		8,790	67.99	
Eligible voters		12,929		
Liberal gain from Green		Swing		+7.5
Source: Elections New Brunswick

2020 provincial election redistributed results
Party	%
Green	43.0
Liberal	35.8
Progressive Conservative	18.6
Independent	1.6
People's Alliance	0.6
New Democratic	0.4

2020 New Brunswick general election
Party	Candidate	Votes	%	±%
Green	Kevin Arseneau	4,021	47.47	+1.55
Liberal	Bertrand LeBlanc	2,933	34.62	-2.74
Progressive Conservative	Stephen Robertson	1,363	16.09	+3.50
Independent	Roger Richard	154	1.82	-1.94
Total valid votes		8,471		
Total rejected ballots		15	0.18	-0.33
Turnout		8,486	69.44	-2.70
Eligible voters		12,220		
Green hold		Swing		+2.15
Source: Elections New Brunswick

2018 New Brunswick general election
Party	Candidate	Votes	%	±%
Green	Kevin Arseneau	4,056	45.91	+27.74
Liberal	Emery Comeau	3,301	37.37	-12.65
Progressive Conservative	Katie Robertson	1,112	12.59	-4.01
Independent	Roger Richard	194	2.20	+2.20
New Democratic	Neil Gardner	171	1.94	-11.83
Total valid votes		8,834	100.0	
Total rejected ballots		45		
Turnout		8,879	72.58	-2.42
Eligible voters		12,234		
Green gain from Liberal		Swing		+20.19
Source: Elections New Brunswick

2014 New Brunswick general election
Party	Candidate	Votes	%	±%
Liberal	Bertrand LeBlanc	4,699	50.02	+3.98
Green	Rébeka Frazer-Chiasson	1,707	18.17	–
Progressive Conservative	Nancy Blanchard	1,559	16.60	-25.84
New Democratic	Allan Marsh	1,294	13.77	+2.25
People's Alliance	Raven-Chanelle Arsenault-Augustine	135	1.44	–
Total valid votes		9,394	100.0	
Total rejected ballots		46	0.49	
Turnout		9,440	75.00	
Eligible voters		12,587		
Liberal notional hold		Swing		-7.10

=== Rogersville-Kouchibouguac ===
2010 New Brunswick general election
Party	Candidate	Votes	%	±%
Liberal	Bertrand LeBlanc	3,438	46.04	+6.60
Progressive Conservative	Jimmy Bourque	3,169	42.44	-13.46
New Democratic	Alida Fagan	860	11.52	+6.86
Total valid votes		7,467	100.0	
Total rejected ballots		151	1.98	
Turnout		7,618	82.83	
Eligible voters		9,197		
Liberal gain from Progressive Conservative		Swing		+10.03

2006 New Brunswick general election
Party	Candidate	Votes	%	±%
Progressive Conservative	Rose-May Poirier	4,332	55.90	+6.52
Liberal	Emery Comeau	3,057	39.45	-5.11
New Democratic	Oscar Doucet	361	4.66	-1.41
Total valid votes		7,750	100.0	
Total rejected ballots		112	1.42	
Turnout		7,862	81.69	
Eligible voters		9,624		
Progressive Conservative notional hold		Swing		+5.82

2003 New Brunswick general election
Party	Candidate	Votes	%	±%
Progressive Conservative	Rose-May Poirier	3,289	49.38	+7.40
Liberal	Maurice Richard	2,968	44.56	+4.36
New Democratic	Oscar Doucet	404	6.07	-11.75
Total valid votes		6,661	100.0	
Progressive Conservative hold		Swing		+1.52

1999 New Brunswick general election
Party	Candidate	Votes	%	±%
Progressive Conservative	Rose-May Poirier	2,820	41.98	+1.57
Liberal	Maurice Richard	2,700	40.20	-12.09
New Democratic	Maria Daigle	1,197	17.82	+10.52
Total valid votes		6,717	100.0	
Progressive Conservative gain from Liberal		Swing		+6.83

1995 New Brunswick general election
Party	Candidate	Votes	%	±%
Liberal	Kenneth Johnson	3,530	52.29	-11.10
Progressive Conservative	Hermel Mazerolle	2,728	40.41	+22.78
New Democratic	Charles Richard	493	7.30	-11.68
Total valid votes		6,751	100.0	
Liberal hold		Swing		-16.94

=== Kent North (1974–1995) ===
1991 New Brunswick general election
Party	Candidate	Votes	%	±%
Liberal	Conrad Landry	3,377	63.39	-3.50
New Democratic	Docile Doiron	1,011	18.98	+11.45
Progressive Conservative	Dominique Babineau	939	17.63	-7.95
Total valid votes		5,327	100.0	
Liberal hold		Swing		-7.48

1987 New Brunswick general election
Party	Candidate	Votes	%	±%
Liberal	Conrad Landry	3,697	66.89	+14.37
Progressive Conservative	Gérald Guimond	1,414	25.58	-15.08
New Democratic	Charles Richard	416	7.53	+0.71
Total valid votes		5,527	100.0	
Liberal hold		Swing		+14.72

1982 New Brunswick general election
Party	Candidate	Votes	%	±%
Liberal	Conrad Landry	2,750	52.52	-16.31
Progressive Conservative	Elzée Thebeau	2,129	40.66	+17.32
New Democratic	Charles R. Richard	357	6.82	–
Total valid votes		5,236	100.0	
Liberal hold		Swing		-16.82

1978 New Brunswick general election
Party	Candidate	Votes	%	±%
Liberal	Joseph Z. Daigle	3,156	68.83	+9.12
Progressive Conservative	Louis Arsenault	1,070	23.34	-5.87
Parti acadien	Philippe Ouellette	359	7.83	+2.15
Total valid votes		4,585	100.0	
Liberal hold		Swing		+7.50

1974 New Brunswick general election
Party	Candidate	Votes	%
Liberal	Joseph Z. Daigle	2,479	59.71
Progressive Conservative	Willie G. Ferguson	1,213	29.21
Parti acadien	Gilles Theriault	236	5.68
Independent	Arcade Fontaine	224	5.39
Total valid votes		4,152	100.0
The previous multi-member riding of Kent elected 3 (of 3) Liberals in the previous election. One Progressive Conservative was elected in the 1971 by-election. None of the three incumbents ran in this riding.

== See also ==
- List of New Brunswick provincial electoral districts
- Canadian provincial electoral districts
