= Saint-Charles Parish, New Brunswick =

Saint-Charles St. Charles
- Parish
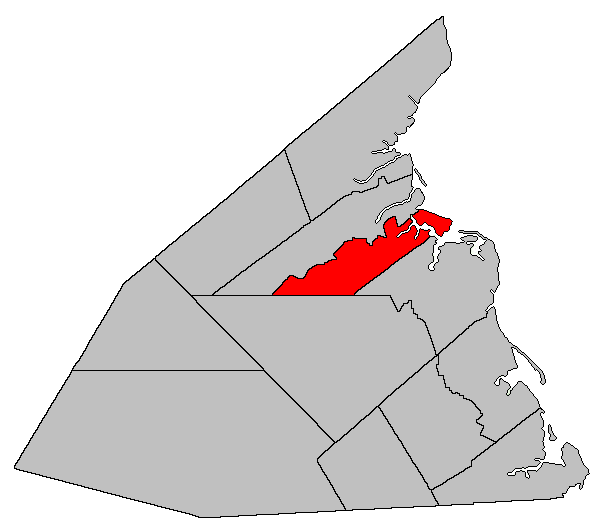
- Location within Kent County, New Brunswick.
- Coordinates: 46.67°N 64.98°W
- Country: Canada
- Province: New Brunswick
- County: Kent County
- Erected: 1909

Area
  - Land: 175.07 km^{2} (67.59 sq mi)

Population (2021)
  - Total: 2,024
  - Density: 11.6/km^{2} (30/sq mi)
  - Change 2016-2021: ▲1.4%
  - Dwellings: 1,025
- Time zone: UTC-4 (AST)
  - Summer (DST): UTC-3 (ADT)

Saint-Charles is a geographic parish in Kent County, New Brunswick, Canada. (Note: The Territorial Division Act divides the province into 152 parishes, the cities of Saint John and Fredericton, and one town of Grand Falls. The Interpretation Act clarifies that parishes include any local government within their borders.)

For governance purposes most of the parish is part of the town of Beaurivage, with a small area on the south part of the village of Five Rivers, both of which members of the Kent Regional Service Commission.

Prior to the 2023 governance reform, the parish was divided between the local service districts of Aldouane and the parish of Saint-Charles.

== Origin of name ==
The parish may take its name from the Roman Catholic ecclesiastical parish of Saint-Charles-Borromée.

== History ==
Saint-Charles was erected in 1909 from parts of Richibucto and Saint-Louis Parishes. The new parish included settlements along the Saint-Charles River, which formed the boundary between Richibucto and Saint-Louis.

== Boundaries ==
Saint-Charles Parish is bounded:

- on the west and north by a line beginning where the Canadian National Railway crosses the northern line of Weldford Parish, which runs due west from the northernmost corner of the Richibucto 15 Indian reserve, and running northeasterly to the rear line of a grant on the Kouchibouguacis River, then generally easterly along the rear of grants along the river to the rear line of grants along the Saint-Charles River, near Route 134, and the prolongation of the rear line of the Saint-Charles River grants northeasterly to Saint-Louis Bay, then out through the gully near Terre-Noire Point and Kouchibouguac Bay to Northumberland Strait;
- on the east by Northumberland Strait;
- on the southeast by a line through Richibucto Harbour and up Northwest Branch to the mouth of Thomas Brook, then northwesterly to the northern line of a grant on the northern line of the town of Richibucto, then southwesterly along the grant to its westernmost corner, about midway between Route 11 and Route 134, and from there southwest to the northern line of Weldford Parish, near Aldouane Station Cross Road;
- on the south by the northern line of Weldford Parish.

== Communities ==
Communities at least partly within the parish; italics indicate a name no longer in official use

- Aldouane
- Aldouane Station
- Grande-Aldouane
- Kent Lake
- Kent Lake Siding

- Lower Saint-Charles
- Petite-Aldouane
- Saint-Charles
- Saint-Charles-Nord
- Saint-Ignace Siding

== Bodies of water ==
Bodies of water (Note: Not including brooks, ponds or coves.) at least partly in the parish:

- Petite rivière Aldouane
- Rivière aux Masquis
- Molus River
- Saint-Charles River
- Northwest Branch
- Jardine Lake
- Kent Lake

- Le Barachois
- Northumberland Strait
- Kouchibouguac Bay
- Baie de Saint-Louis
- Richibucto Harbour
- Richibucto Gully

== Conservation areas ==
Parks, historic sites, and related entities in the parish.

- Kouchibouguac National Park

== Demographics ==
=== Population ===
Population trend

Census	Population	Change (%)
2016	1,997	▲0.8%
2011	1,982	▼5.3%
2006	2,093	▼0.1%
2001	2,095	▼2.2%
1996	2,142	▲1.9%
1991	2,102	N/A

=== Language ===
Mother tongue (2016)

Language	Population	Pct (%)
French only	1,630	81.5%
English only	305	15.2%
Both English and French	45	2.3%
Other languages	20	1.0%

== See also ==
- List of parishes in New Brunswick
