= Saint Charles Parish =

Saint Charles Parish may refer to:

- St. Charles Parish, Louisiana, United States
- Saint-Charles Parish, New Brunswick, Canada
