= Kenneth Johnson (politician) =

Canadian politician

Kenneth Johnson (October 6, 1944 – January 2005) was a political figure in New Brunswick, Canada. He represented Rogersville-Kouchibouguac in the Legislative Assembly of New Brunswick from 1995 to 1999 as a Liberal member.

He was born in Saint-Louis-de-Kent, New Brunswick and educated at Dalhousie University and the University of Moncton. Johnson was a municipal administrator in Saint-Louis-de-Kent. He also served as president and director for the local Caisse-Populaire. Johnson died at the age of 60, apparently from injuries sustained after losing control of his snowmobile

New seat	MLA for Rogersville-Kouchibouguac; 1995–1999	Succeeded by Rose-May Poirier (Progressive Conservative)
