= Rose-May Poirier =

Canadian politician (born 1954)

The Honourable Rose-May Poirier
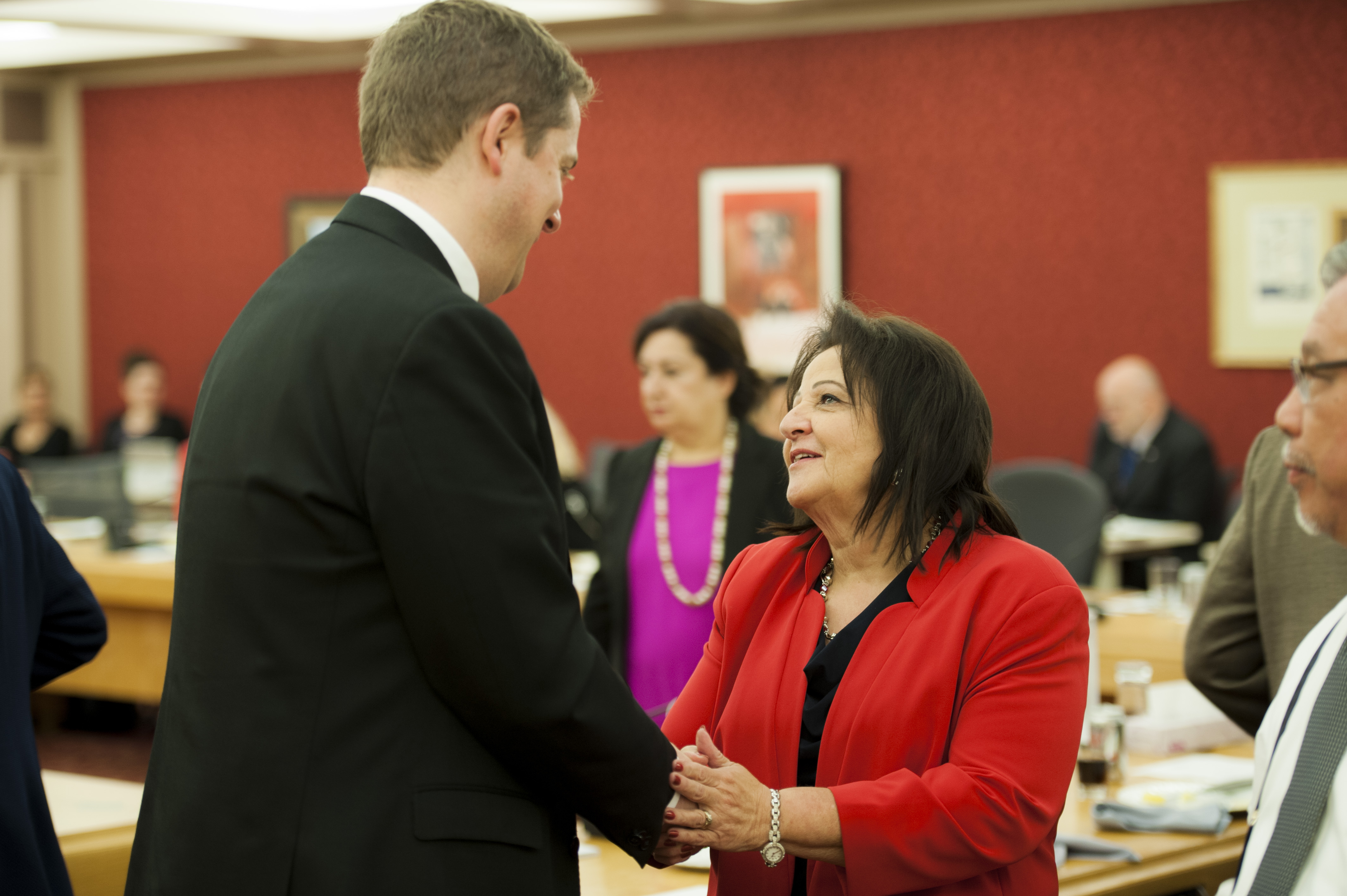
- Poirier speaking with Andrew Scheer in 2017

Canadian Senator from New Brunswick (Saint-Louis-de-Kent)
- Incumbent
- Assumed office February 28, 2010
- Nominated by: Stephen Harper
- Appointed by: Michaëlle Jean

Minister responsible for Human Resources
- In office June 9, 2003 – September 18, 2006
- Premier: Bernard Lord

Member of the Legislative Assembly of New Brunswick for Rogersville-Kouchibouguac
- In office June 21, 1999 – February 27, 2010
- Preceded by: Kenneth Johnson
- Succeeded by: Bertrand LeBlanc

Personal details
- Born: March 2, 1954 (age 72) Chatham, New Brunswick, Canada
- Party: Conservative (Federal)
- Other political affiliations: Progressive Conservative (Provincial)

Rose-May Poirier (born March 2, 1954) is a Canadian politician from New Brunswick. She has been a member of the Senate of Canada since February 28, 2010. Previously, she served as member of the Legislative Assembly of New Brunswick for Rogersville-Kouchibouguac from 1999 to 2010 and municipal councillor in Saint-Louis-de-Kent from 1993 to 1999.

A Progressive Conservative, she was first elected to the Legislative Assembly of New Brunswick in the 1999 provincial election defeating Liberal candidate Maurice Richard by just over 100 votes – the closest result of the election. She faced Richard again in the 2003 election and defeated him by 321 votes.

Poirier joined the New Brunswick cabinet following the 2003 election as minister responsible for the Office of Human Resources and retained that post until a cabinet shuffle in early 2006 when she became Minister of Local Government and Minister responsible for Aboriginal Affairs.

She was re-elected in 2006 in which her party's government was defeated and went into opposition.

On January 29, 2010, she was appointed to fill a vacant New Brunswick seat in the Canadian Senate by Prime Minister Stephen Harper. Her appointment became effective February 28, 2010. Unlike the other four senators named on January 29, Poirier's appointment was delayed a month so that the government of New Brunswick would not have to call a by-election to replace her just months before the 2010 provincial election.

She was the deputy chair of the Canadian Senate Standing Committee on Official Languages in the 45th Canadian Parliament.

New Brunswick provincial government of Bernard Lord
Cabinet posts (2)
Predecessor	Office	Successor
Trevor Holder	Minister of Local Government; 2006; Holder served as Minister of Environment and Local Government	Victor Boudreau
Rodney Weston	Minister of Human Resources; 2003–2006; Weston served as Minister responsible for Human Resources	Dale Graham
Special Cabinet Responsibilities
Predecessor	Title	Successor
Brad Green	Minister responsible for Aboriginal Affairs; 2006	Ed Doherty
