= Jackie Vautour =

Canadian activist (died 2021)

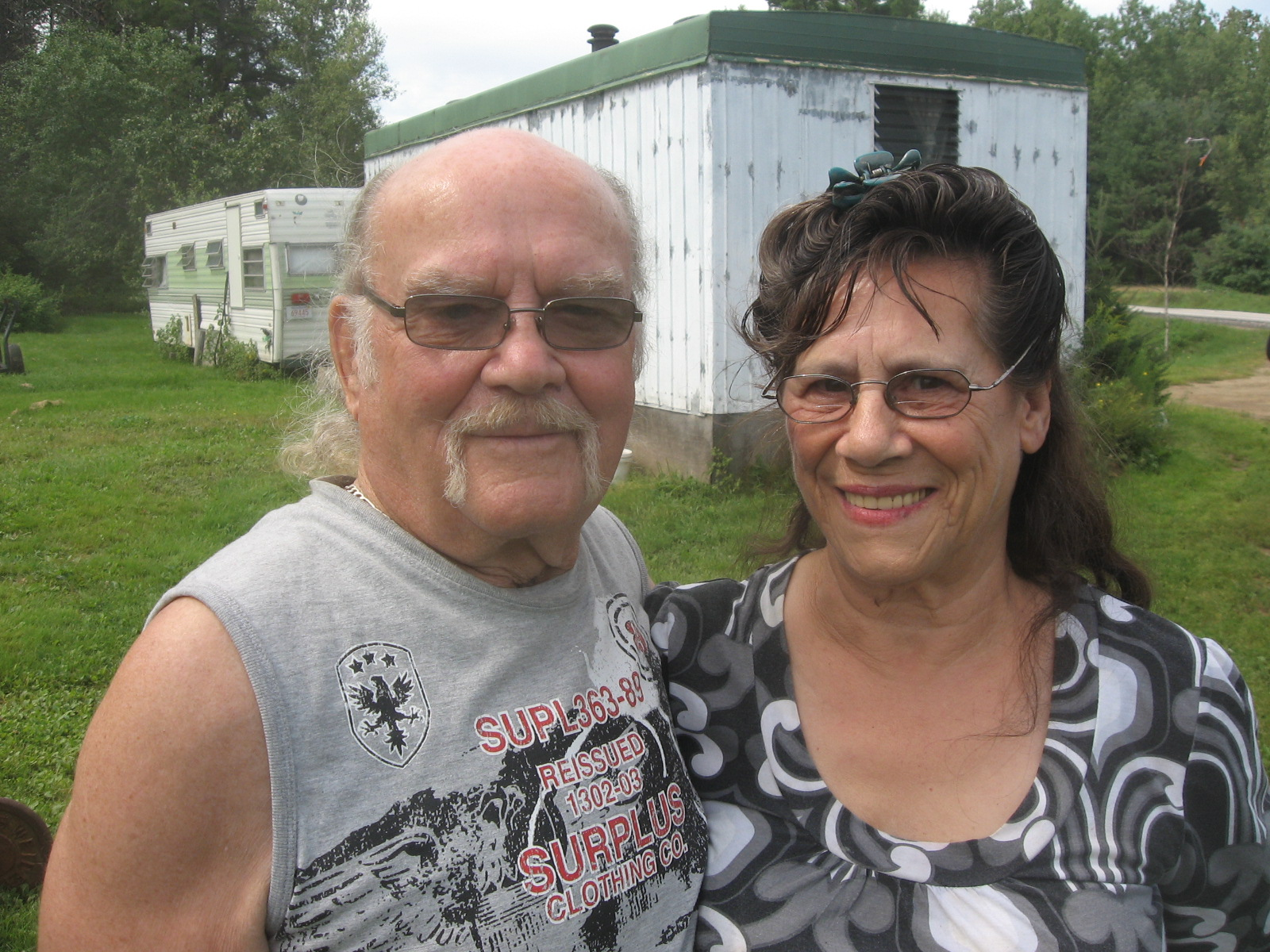
Jackie Vautour with his wife Yvonne Vautour in 2008

John L. Vautour (1928 – February 7, 2021) was a Canadian fisherman, born in Claire-Fontaine, New Brunswick, best known for his fight against the expropriation of 250 families in the early 1970s to create Kouchibouguac National Park on land formerly occupied by eight villages.

== Personal life ==
Jackie Vautour was born in Claire-Fontaine, New Brunswick. He and his wife Yvonne have nine children (Edmond, Roy, Ronny, Rocky, Jeanne, Linda, Simonne, Maureen & Rachelle).

He is nicknamed the "Rebel of Kouchibouguac".

== Jackie Vautour case ==
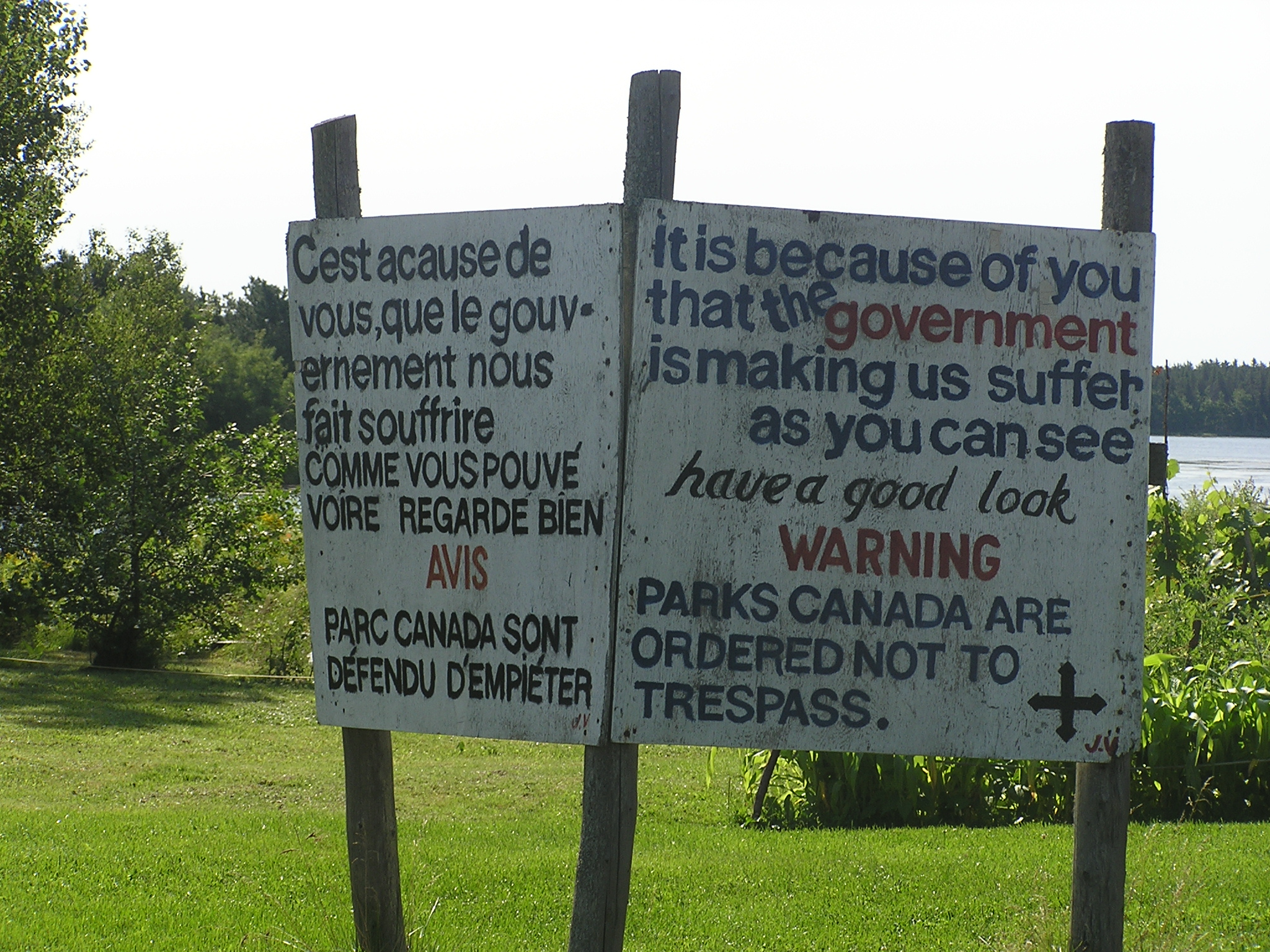
Sign marking the property claimed by Jackie Vautour at Kouchibouguac National Park, 2010

In the late 1960s, the Acadians of Kent County, New Brunswick were among the poorest people of the province, and Louis Robichaud—who was both the MLA for Kent, and the Premier of New Brunswick—sought to eliminate poverty by creating a national park.

Kouchibouguac National Park was established in 1969 during the expansion of the national parks network in Atlantic Canada. An agreement was signed between the provincial government of Louis Robichaud and the federal government of Pierre Elliott Trudeau to create the park. However, a requirement was that land be expropriated for park creation. The private properties within the future park area were evaluated by professional evaluators working for or hired by the Department of Natural Resources. When they reported the estimated value of the properties to be expropriated, Louis Robichaud decided to cut the total estimate in half. A provincial civil servant, who had been involved in a similar expropriation for military Camp Gagetown, stated that the original Kouchibouquac estimates were approximately half of those for Camp Gagetown for equivalent properties. The comparison with English-speaking New Brunswickers in Gagetown especially angered Jackie Vautour when he learned of the expropriation.

Seven villages were expropriated, comprising 228 families, representing 1200 people. These families, mostly all fishermen and farmers, had inhabited the area for several generations and were mostly poorly educated and less fortunate.

Auguste Landry negotiated the purchase of homes and land by the government. Families received an average of $10,000 to $12,000 depending on the value of properties. Nearly half accepted the offer. Some of the expropriated residents complained because they received much less than others. The expropriated residents also felt cramped in the new, more expensive, communities where they settled.

During the late 1960s, the issue of expropriation sparked student interest. One of the students, a recent graduate and social activist, was Gilles Thériault, head of the Southeast Regional Planning Council (an organization funded by the New Brunswick government). The organization was very active and Jackie Vautour was noticed. Vautour, chairman of the Claire-Fontaine citizens, directed the resistance to park creation. On November 5, 1976, the Kent County sheriff arrived at Claire-Fontaine with an eviction warrant. Vautour's house was demolished while the Vautour family was in jail, and his personal effects were sent to a warehouse. The Vautour family was housed at provincial government expense in a Richibucto motel. They were expelled in March 1977 by the Royal Canadian Mounted Police using tear gas. The charges were dropped in July 1978, and the Vautour family returned to live in the park. In 1978, 600 expropriated residents signed a petition to get back their properties. Several clashes occurred with the police. Vautour refused all offers of land or money from the government: they offered him $20,670, while he requested $150,000. In 1979, he challenged the expropriation in court but the court ruled the expropriation was legal. Two hundred people then rioted in the park, followed by another riot a few weeks later. The riots precipitated the creation of a commission of inquiry, which placed blame on the federal government, granting compensation of $1,600,000 to those who were expropriated.

In 1980, Louis Robichaud said that people were "happy to be expropriated". In response, some citizens burned him in effigy.

In 1987, during his last night as Premier, Richard Hatfield invited the Vautours to his residence to offer an agreement. He offered the family two parcels of land adding up to 110 acres of property and 270 000$ in exchange for their land. The Vautours accepted the money, claiming that the money went towards legal fees. However, they stayed on their land.

In 1998, Jackie Vautour, his wife Yvonne and their sons Roy and Ron were arrested for illegally harvesting shellfish in the park. In 1999, they were convicted under the Law on National Parks of Canada. They were exonerated on appeal, and were compensated. It was at this moment the Vautour family began to claim Metis heritage confusing noun with title. Jackie and one of his sons then got a second trial and invoked their ancestral rights. The trial, scheduled to begin in 2002, was repeatedly postponed until 2006. In 2008, Jackie Vautour announced the discovery of evidence that they had never been legally expropriated. In 2009, he returned to court, defended by lawyer Robert Rideout. His defense is based on the assumption that the inhabitants of the communities liquidated to form Kouchibouguac are Métis (i.e., they descend from both Mi'kmaq and early European settlers), and therefore his clients have an aboriginal right to harvest clams, according to the Canadian constitution. However the word metis is a french noun used to describe "mixed-race" peoples of native and european ancestry, much like the Spanish noun mestizo. Jackie and the community in question are not considered part of the Metis nation, nor are they granted metis title to the land under section 35 of the Constitution Act. Kouchibouguac remains on Mi'kmaq unceded territory.

According to historian Alan MacEachern, the Jackie Vautour case has changed the history of national parks in Canada and how the land is expropriated. According to Professor MacEachern, Parks Canada has especially focused on opening parks in northern Canada, because there are fewer residents. The law now prohibits Parks Canada from expropriating residents to create a park.

In 2009, the Canadian government invested $1.3 million in the park, especially to showcase its history and dispossessed communities.

== Death ==
Vautour died of liver cancer and pneumonia in 2021 at the age of 92.

== In popular culture ==
The Louisiana musician Zachary Richard met Jackie Vautour for the first time in 1977. He later organized a benefit concert for the expropriated and wrote "La ballade de Jackie Vautour" (The Ballad of Jackie Vautour).

The film Massabielle, made in 1982 by Jacques Savoie, recalls the story of Jackie Vautour. In 2007, Jean Bourbonnais directed the documentary Kouchibouguac. The film opened at the International Francophone Film Festival in Acadia in the same year. Zachary Richard, the narrator asks, in a message shown before the screening that governments officially recognize "the injustice that was committed against the dispossessed families".

Annual reunions have been held in the park since 2006. In 2009, historian Ronald Rudin of Concordia University, announced his intent to write a book and develop a website focusing on the park's history.

In 2011, the young Acadian playwright Emma Haché presented a play telling the expropriation story.
