= Elia W. Peattie =

American journalist (1862–1935)

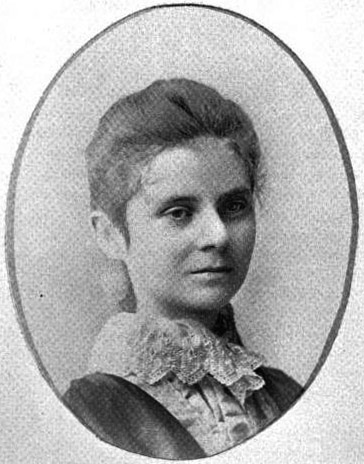
Elia W. Peattie, c. 1896

Elia Wilkinson Peattie (January 15, 1862 – July 12, 1935) was an American author, journalist and critic.

== Biography ==
Elia Wilkinson was the daughter of Frederick and Amanda (Cahill) Wilkinson. She was born on January 15, 1862, in Kalamazoo, Michigan, but moved with her family to Chicago when she was young. She stopped attending school when she was fourteen, but kept up a reading habit. In 1883, she married Robert Burns Peattie, a Chicago journalist.

She began writing short stories for newspapers, and in 1886 became a reporter with the Chicago Tribune and subsequently the Chicago Daily News. In 1888, the family moved to Omaha after Peattie and her husband accepted jobs at the Omaha Daily Herald. When Gilbert Hitchcock bought the Daily Herald and combined it into the Omaha World-Herald Peattie became chief editorial writer for the paper. Peattie wrote over 800 columns, editorials, and stories in the World-Herald offering a voice to frontier women. Peattie did not limit her articles to societal pieces and was active in political discourse. A supporter of orphanages, charity hospitals, and the need for shelters she also took a hard line and was outspoken in her opposition of capital punishment, lynching, and the Wounded Knee Massacre.

She wrote for magazines including Century, Lippincott's Magazine, Cosmopolitan Magazine, St. Nicholas, Wide Awake, The American Magazine, America, Harper's Weekly, and San Francisco Argonaut. In these stories Peattie presented hope and refused to bend to Modernism and its disillusioned outlook on life.

In 1888, she was commissioned by Chicago publishers to write a young people's history of the United States, and wrote the seven-hundred page The Story of America in four months. Her novel The Judge won a $900 prize from the Detroit Free Press in 1889, and was subsequently published in book form. Later in 1889 the Northern Pacific Railroad employed her to visit and report on Alaska: A Trip through Wonderland became a popular guide-book. With Scrip and Staff (1891) was a story of the children's crusade. Some time after 1890, Peattie befriended fellow writer Kate McPhelim Cleary while both were living in Nebraska. The two bonded over their financial, health, and family concerns.

Peattie subsequently returned to Chicago and became literary editor of the Chicago Tribune. Some time during her period in Illinois, she was a member of the Eagle's Nest Art Colony in Ogle County. One of her sons was the famed botanist, naturalist and author Donald Culross Peattie.

== Works ==
- The Story of America (1889)
- The Judge (1889)
- A Trip Through Wonderland (1889)
- With Scrip and Staff (1891)
- The American Peasant: A Timely Allegory (1892)
- The Pictorial Story of America (1895)
- The Shape of Fear and Other Ghostly Tales (1898)
- The Edge of Things (1903)
- Castle, Knight & Troubadour: In an Apology and Three Tableaux (1903)
- Ickery Ann: And Other Girls and Boys (1907)
- Annie Laurie and Azalea (1913)
- Azalea at Sunset Gap (1914)
- Lotta Embury's Career (1915)
- Azalea's Silver Web (1915)
- Sarah Brewster's Relatives (1916)
- The Newcomers (1917)
- Times and Manner: A Pageant (1918)
- Songs from a Southern Garden (1930)
