= Bertrand LeBlanc =

Canadian politician

Bertrand LeBlanc MLA

Member of the New Brunswick Legislative Assembly for Rogersville-Kouchibouguac
- In office September 27, 2010 – September 22, 2014
- Preceded by: Rose-May Poirier
- Succeeded by: riding redistributed

Member of the New Brunswick Legislative Assembly for Kent North
- In office September 22, 2014 – September 24, 2018
- Preceded by: first member
- Succeeded by: Kevin Arseneau

Personal details
- Party: Liberal

Bertrand LeBlanc is a Canadian politician, who was elected to the Legislative Assembly of New Brunswick in the 2010 provincial election. He represented the electoral district of Rogersville-Kouchibouguac from 2010 to 2014, and the redistributed district of Kent North from 2014 to 2018, as a member of the Liberals.
