= Beaurivage =

- Town
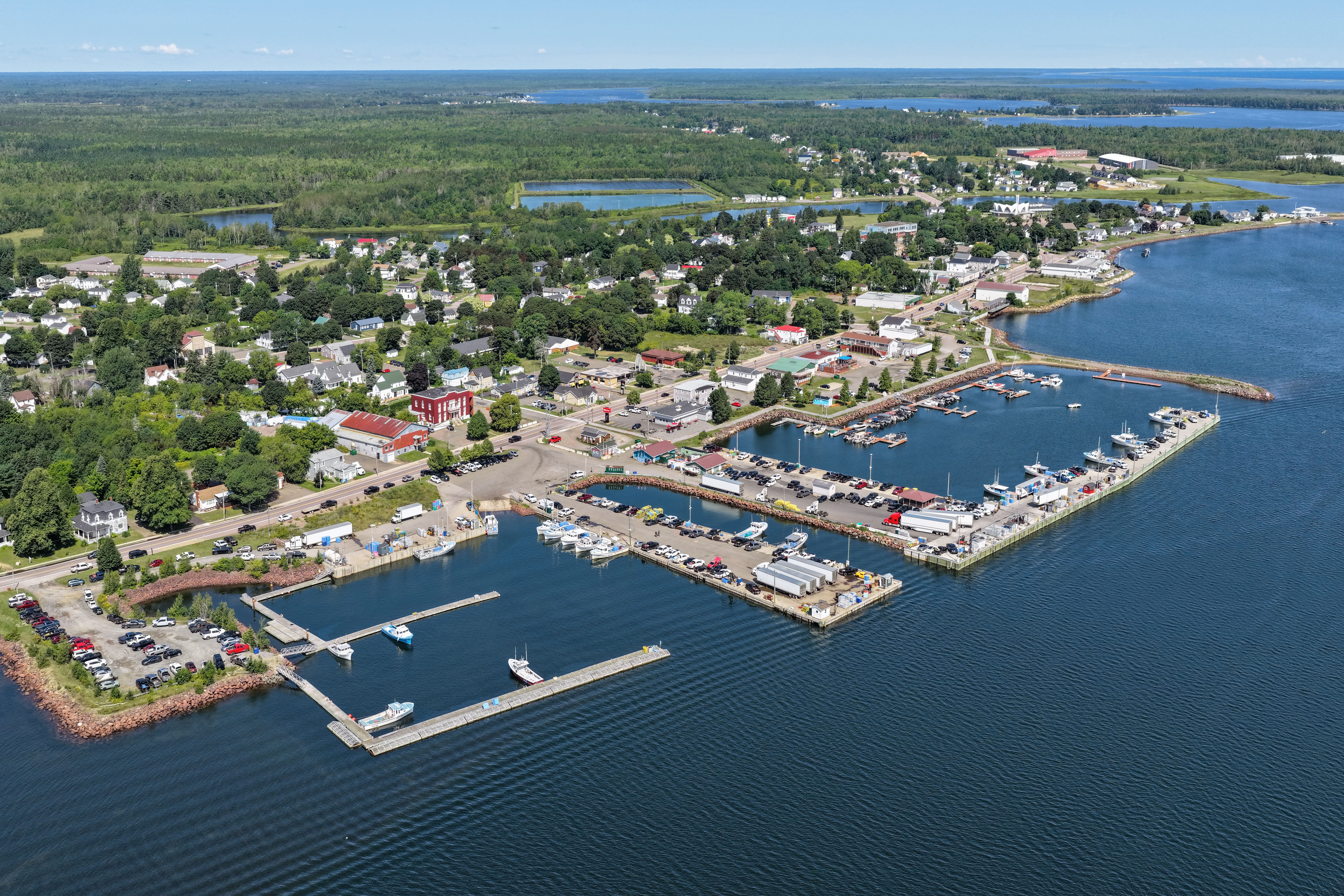

- Location within New Brunswick
- Coordinates: 46°40′48″N 64°52′12″W
- Country: Canada
- Province: New Brunswick
- County: Kent County
- Regional service commission: Kent
- Incorporated: January 1, 2023

Government
  - Type: Town Council
  - Mayor: Danielle Andrée Dugas
- Time zone: UTC-4 (AST)
  - Summer (DST): UTC-3 (ADT)
- Postal code(s): E4W
- Area code: 506

Beaurivage (French pronunciation: [boʁivaʒ]) is a town in the Canadian province of New Brunswick. It was formed through the 2023 New Brunswick local governance reforms.

== Geography ==
The town is situated on the Richibucto River where it discharges into the Northumberland Strait.

== History ==
Beaurivage was incorporated on January 1, 2023 via the amalgamation of the former town of Richibucto and the former village of Saint-Louis de Kent as well as the concurrent annexation of adjacent unincorporated areas.

== Economy ==
The downtown area, situated on the mouth of the river, has commercial fishing wharves, several restaurants, and local stores. The economy is dominated by lobster and deep sea fishing.

== Attractions ==
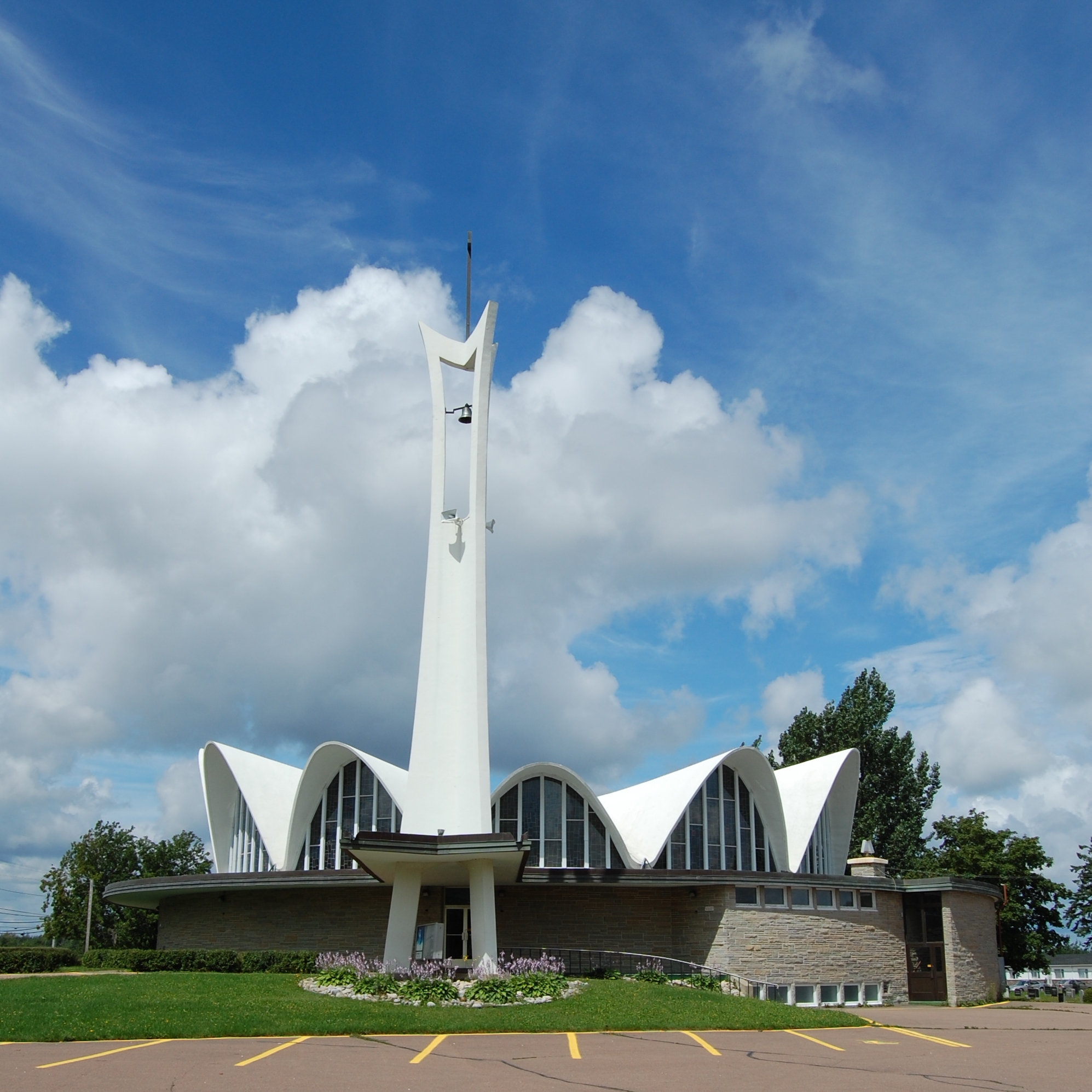
St. Louis de Gonzague Roman Catholic Church is a notable Beaurivage landmark

- St. Louis de Gonzague Roman Catholic Church was completed in 1965. Designed by Belanger and Roy of Moncton, it was inspired by the designs of the Spanish architect, Félix Candela.

== Notable people ==
- Kate McPhelim Cleary (1863–1905), novelist
- Murray MacLaren (1861–1942), doctor, politician
- George McLeod (1836–1905),
- James D. Phinney (November 17, 1844 – ) lawyer, judge, politician
- Henry Powell (1855–1930), politician
- Louis Robichaud (1925–2005), former Premier of New Brunswick
- Peter Veniot (1863–1926), former Premier of New Brunswick
- Charles Wesley Weldon (1830–1896), lawyer, politician

== See also ==
- List of communities in New Brunswick
- List of municipalities in New Brunswick
