= Saint-Ignace, New Brunswick =

Saint-Ignace
- Community
- Location of Saint-Ignace in New Brunswick
- Coordinates: 46.702°N 65.083°W
- Country: Canada
- Province: New Brunswick
- County: Kent County
- Local service district: 1973

Government
  - MP: Dominic LeBlanc
  - MLA: Kevin Arseneau

Area
  - Total: 31.90 km^{2} (12.32 sq mi)
- Elevation: 0 to 6 m (0 to 20 ft)

Population (2011)^{[1]}
  - Total: 606
  - Density: 19/km^{2} (49/sq mi)
- Time zone: Atlantic Standard Time (-4)

Saint-Ignace is a settlement in Kent County, New Brunswick, Canada on the Kouchibouguacis River. It was part of the former local service district of Saint-Ignace, which also included the community of Camerons Mill.

== Geography ==
=== Geology ===
The basement of Saint-Ignatius is composed mainly of sedimentary rock group dating from the Pictou Pennsylvanian (300 to 311 million years ago)

== Demographics ==
In the 2021 Census of Population conducted by Statistics Canada, Saint-Ignace had a population of 566 living in 254 of its 278 total private dwellings, a change of −0.2% from its 2016 population of 567. With a land area of 31.9 km^{2} (12.3 sq mi), it had a population density of 17.7/km^{2} (46.0/sq mi) in 2021.

== Notable people ==
- Mia Martina, singer

== See also ==
- List of communities in New Brunswick
