= Pat Finnigan =

Canadian Liberal politician

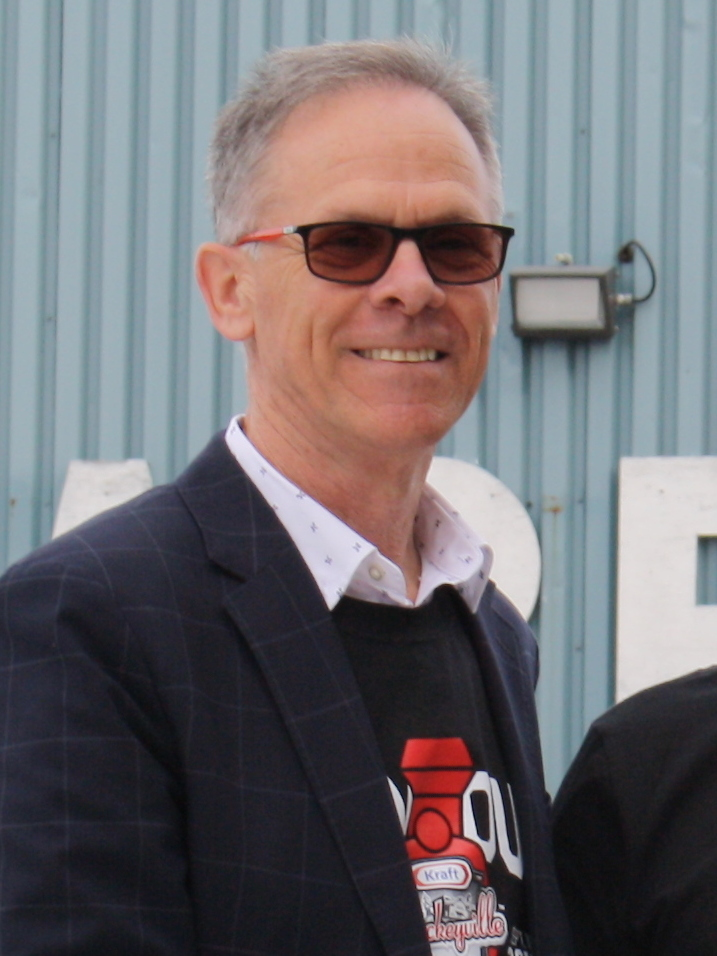
- Finnigan in 2019

Member of the New Brunswick Legislative Assembly for Kent North
- Assuming office November 2, 2024
- Succeeding: Kevin Arseneau

Member of Parliament for Miramichi—Grand Lake
- In office October 19, 2015 – September 20, 2021
- Preceded by: Tilly O'Neill-Gordon
- Succeeded by: Jake Stewart

Chairman of the Standing Committee on Agriculture and Agri-Food
- In office February 3, 2016 – September 20, 2021
- Minister: Lawrence MacAulay; Marie-Claude Bibeau
- Preceded by: Bev Shipley

Personal details
- Born: 1955 (age 70–71)
- Party: New Brunswick Liberal Association
- Other political affiliations: Liberal Party of Canada
- Spouse: Lise
- Education: Nova Scotia Agricultural College
- Profession: Businessman

Patrick Finnigan (born 1955) is a Canadian Liberal politician, who was elected to represent the riding of Miramichi—Grand Lake in the House of Commons of Canada in the 2015 federal election.

Finnigan and his wife started a bakery and garden centre in Nouvelle-Arcadie, called Mr. Tomato. Finnigan holds a technical diploma in phytology.

He chaired the Standing Committee on Agriculture and Agri-Food.

He did not run for reelection in the 2021 Canadian federal election. He was subsequently elected to the Legislative Assembly of New Brunswick in the 2024 New Brunswick general election, representing the electoral district of Kent North. On November 1, 2024, it was announced that he was placed on the cabinet as Minister of Agriculture, Aquaculture and Fisheries.

== Electoral record ==
2024 New Brunswick general election: Kent North
Party	Candidate	Votes	%	±%
Liberal	Pat Finnigan	3,928	44.81	+9.0
Green	Kevin Arseneau	3,251	37.09	-5.9
Progressive Conservative	Carl Cosby	1,441	16.44	-2.2
People's Alliance	Carole Boudreau	145	1.65	+1.1
Total valid votes		8,765	99.72	
Total rejected ballots		25	0.28	
Turnout		8,790	67.00	
Eligible voters		13,119		
Liberal gain from Green		Swing		+7.5
Source: Elections New Brunswick

2019 Canadian federal election: Miramichi—Grand Lake
Party	Candidate	Votes	%	±%	Expenditures
Liberal	Pat Finnigan	12,722	36.77	-10.54	$60,001.00
Conservative	Peggy McLean	12,352	35.70	+1.39	$77,010.45
Green	Patty Deitch	3,914	11.31	+8.29	$1,989.98
New Democratic	Eileen Clancy Teslenko	2,875	8.31	-7.06	$949.65
People's	Ron Nowlan	1,179	3.41	-	none listed
Independent	Allison MacKenzie	1,160	3.35	-	$13,665.83
Independent	Mathew Grant Lawson	396	1.14	-	$444.70
Total valid votes/expense limit		34,598	100.00		
Total rejected ballots		517			
Turnout		35,115			
Eligible voters		48,240			
Liberal hold		Swing		-5.90	
Source: Elections Canada

2015 Canadian federal election
Party	Candidate	Votes	%	±%	Expenditures
Liberal	Pat Finnigan	17,202	47.3	+25.93	–
Conservative	Tilly O'Neill-Gordon	12,476	34.3	-18.89	–
New Democratic	Patrick Colford	5,588	15.4	-7.46	–
Green	Matthew Ian Clark	1,098	3.0	+0.54	–
Total valid votes/Expense limit		36,364	100.0		$201,429.03
Total rejected ballots		256	–	–	
Turnout		36,620	76%	–	
Eligible voters		48,158			
Liberal gain from Conservative		Swing		+21.63	
Source: Elections Canada
