= Kouchibouguac River =

River in New Brunswick, Canada

Coordinates: 46°49′27.9″N 64°56′33.9″W

There is another Kouchibouguac River that empties into the Northumberland Strait at Beaubassin East in New Brunswick.

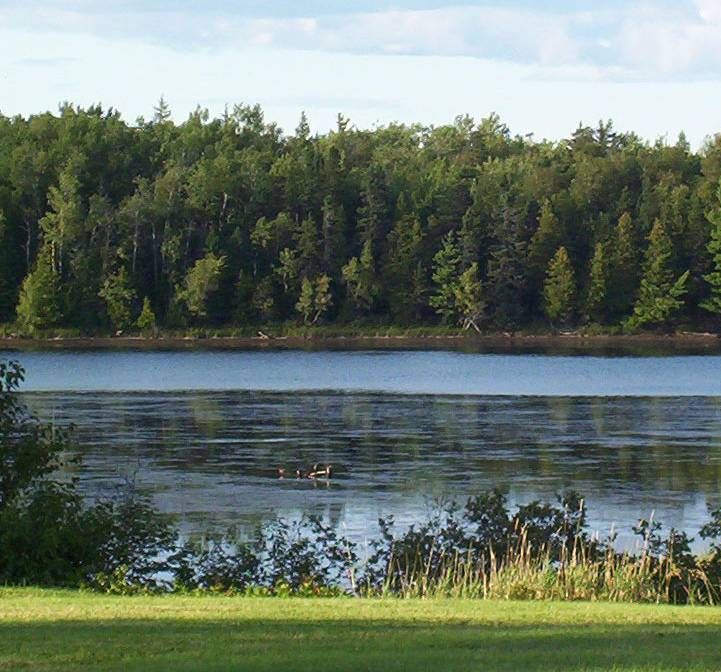
Kouchibouguac River in Kouchibouguac National Park

The Kouchibouguac River is a river in eastern New Brunswick, Canada, which empties into the Northumberland Strait. It is 72 kilometres (44.7 mi) long. It is not to be confused with the Kouchibouguacis River running parallel to this river, about 6 kilometres (4 mi) to the south.

This river flows through Kouchibouguac National Park. The river's name means "river of the long tides" in Mi'kmaq.

During the 19th century, the white pine forests of the area were logged to provide masts and booms for the ships of the Royal Navy. Ships were built at the mouth of this river to transport the logs to Britain.

== See also ==
- List of rivers of New Brunswick
