= James D. Phinney =

Canadian politician

MLA for Kent County
- In office 1887 to 1895

Personal details
- Born: November 17, 1844 Richibucto, New Brunswick
- Died: February 28, 1915 (aged 70) Fredericton, New Brunswick
- Party: Liberal-Conservative

James Douglas Phinney, QC (November 17, 1844 – February 28, 1915) was a lawyer, judge and political figure in New Brunswick, Canada. He represented Kent County in the Legislative Assembly of New Brunswick from 1887 to 1895 as a Liberal-Conservative.

He was born in Richibucto, New Brunswick, the son of Zaccheus Phinney and Elizabeth Clark, and studied at the University of New Brunswick. He taught school for some time, went on to study law and was called to the bar in 1869. Phinney became clerk in the court for Kent County in 1871. In 1872, he married Fannie J. Davis. He served as judge of probate from 1878 to 1887. He also served as school trustee and was a director for the Kent Northern Railway. He was first elected to the provincial assembly in an 1887 by-election held after William Wheton resigned his seat. Phinney was named Queen's Counsel in 1891. He died in 1915 and was buried in Fredericton Rural Cemetery.
