= Kate McPhelim Cleary =

Canadian-American author

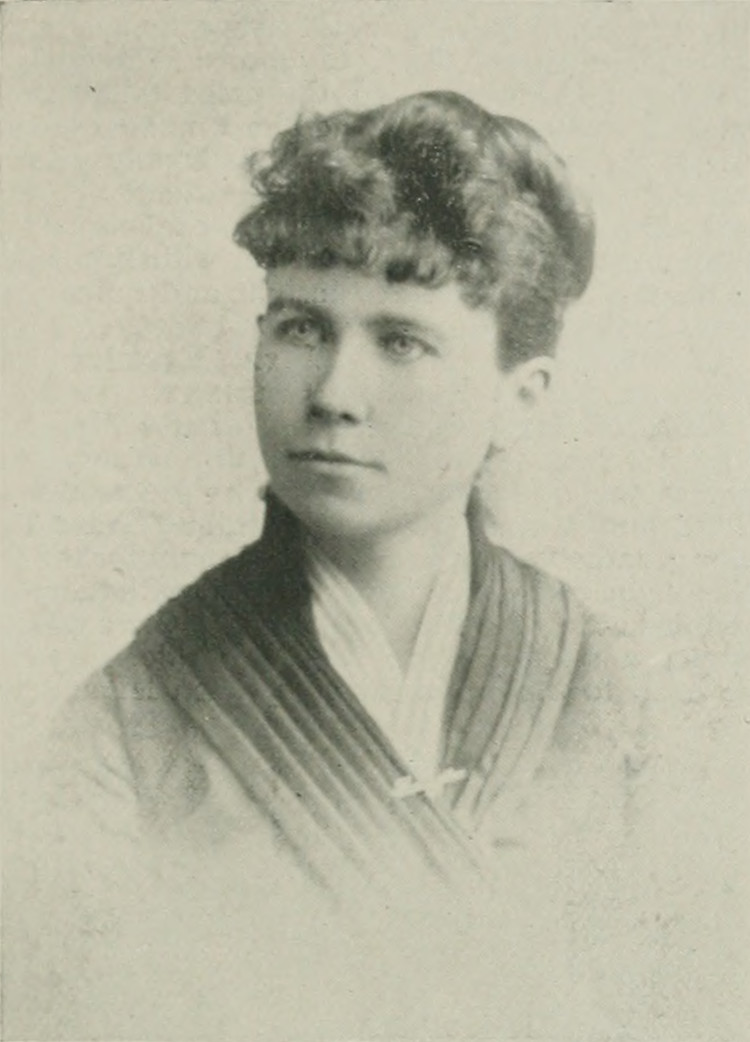
"A Woman of the Century"

Kate McPhelim Cleary (August 22, 1863 – July 16, 1905) was a 19th-century Canadian-American author.

== Biography ==
Kate McPhelim was born on August 22, 1863, in Richibucto, New Brunswick, the daughter of James McPhelim and Margaret Kelly, two Irish immigrants who had met after moving to Canada. Her father died when she was two years old, leaving her mother to raise her four children alone. After a brief return to Ireland to live with relatives, financial hardships forced the family to emigrate to Philadelphia. McPhelim published her first poem at the age of 14 before briefly turning to painting and sketching for money. In 1878, at age 15, she published her first short story, "Only Jerry" in the magazine Saturday Night and began writing prose and poetry in earnest, often under the pseudonym "K. Temple More". During this time, all four of the McPhelim children turned to writing stories, poems and articles for such publications as The Chicago Tribune and Philadelphia's Saturday Night as a source of income for the family.

Two years later in 1880, McPhelim's family moved to Chicago, where she married local businessman Michael Timothy Cleary in 1884. Mrs. Clearly later reflected on her period in Chicago in her semiautobiographical short story "Why We Didn't Hear Nilsson" (1899): "We were poor. We were disgustingly poor. We were absurdly poor. Not that our poverty distressed us. We generally got what we wanted — on credit. To our credit be it said we always paid — when we had the money." Not long after her marriage, they relocated with her mother to Hubbell, Nebraska, where Michael Cleary had established a lumber business in partnership with his brother-in-law, John Templeton. Between the years of 1887 and 1894, she gave birth to five children (James, Marguerite, Gerald, Rosemarie and Vera Valentine). Her mother died of pneumonia in 1893, and in 1894 her own life was threatened by a fever following the birth of her youngest daughter, Vera. In that same year, her daughter Marguerite died of typhoid fever at the age of six. During this period, she had befriended fellow writer Elia W. Peattie, and the two bonded over their shared financial, health, and family concerns. In 1893, Peattie wrote a tribute to Cleary titled "A Bohemian in Nebraska".

In 1895, Michael Cleary left temporarily for Chicago in an attempt to rescue his business, and during the next three years he traveled frequently in search of a better climate to alleviate his failing health. In 1895, her daughter Rosemarie died at the age of three. Two years later, Kate gave birth to another son (Edward) in 1897. In 1898 her husband sold the lumber business and moved the family to Chicago.

In 1902, Cleary voluntarily entered a private sanitarium for an addiction to morphine. The following year she was admitted to the Illinois Northern Hospital for the Insane in Elgin, Illinois in order to recover from her morphine dependency. The hospital pronounced her sane in the spring of 1904. In 1905, her husband attempted to commit Cleary involuntarily to an insane asylum, but his attempt was thwarted by a court battle in which a jury determined that she was sane. She died soon thereafter at the age of 41, succumbing to a heart condition she had endured most of her life.

== Critical response and legacy ==
By the end of her life, Kate McPhelim Cleary published hundreds of stories, essays, and poems, as well as one novel, The Gallant Lady in 1897. In 1898, she was named by The Chicago Chronicle as "One of the three leading women humorists in Chicago". Her short stories regularly appeared in such publications as The Chicago Tribune, Puck, Belford's Monthly, The Chicago Daily News, McClure's, Good Housekeeping, Cosmopolitan, St. Nicholas, and The Youth's Companion. Her poem "Nebraska" was recited at the World's Columbian Exposition in Chicago in 1893. Her feminist novel Like a Gallant Lady was received favorably by the critical press, which compared her novel to the works of Hamlin Garland.

== Selected works ==
- "The Lady of Lynhurst" (1886)
- "Vella Vernel" (1887)
- Feet of Clay (1893)
- "Nebraska" (1893)
- "Told on a Prairie Schooner' (1893)
- "The New Man" (1895)
- "A Prairie Sketch" (1895)
- "Dust Storm" (1895)
- Like a Gallant Lady (1897)
- "Jim Peterson’s Pension" (1899)
- "The Rebellion of Mrs. McLelland" (1899)
- "An Ornament to Society" (1899)
- "The Road That Didn’t Lead Anywhere" (1899)
- "His Onliest One" (1899)
- "How Jimmy Ran Away" (1899)
- "Sent to Syringa" (1899)
- "The Stepmother" (1901)

== Adaptations ==
- In 2001, the Radio Tales series produced the radio drama Feet of Clay, which was an adaptation of Kate McPhelim Cleary's short story of the same name, as published in Belford's Monthly magazine in 1893. The radio drama adaptation premiered on National Public Radio and is subsequently broadcast on XM Satellite Radio.
