= Kevin Arseneau =

Canadian politician

Member of the New Brunswick Legislative Assembly for Kent North
- In office September 24, 2018 – September 19, 2024
- Preceded by: Bertrand LeBlanc
- Succeeded by: Pat Finnigan

Co-deputy leader of the Green Party of New Brunswick
- Incumbent
- Assumed office September 14, 2023; Serving with Megan Mitton

Personal details
- Born: August 25, 1985 (age 41) Robertville, New Brunswick, Canada
- Party: Green Party of New Brunswick
- Education: Université de Moncton
- Occupation: Farmer and Teacher

Kevin Arseneau is a Canadian politician, who was first elected to the Legislative Assembly of New Brunswick in the 2018 election and served in the New Brunswick Legislative Assembly until 2024. He represented the electoral district of Kent North as a member of the Green Party, of which he is one of the Deputy Leaders. He is the first Acadian to be elected as a third-party MLA in New Brunswick as well as the first Francophone in North America to be elected under the Green Party banner.

== Early life and education ==
Arseneau was born on August 25, 1985, in Robertville, New Brunswick. In 2003, he graduated from École Secondaire Népisiguit in Bathurst. He holds an education degree from the Université de Moncton with a major in geography and a minor in history. He also has a diploma in adventure tourism from the Cégep de la Gaspésie et des Îles.

== Career ==
Arseneau is a farmer and member of the Ferme Terre Partagée workers’ cooperative, a farm that produces organic fruit and vegetables and raises animals humanely, and which received an award in 2018 from RDÉE Canada (Réseau de développement économique et d’employabilité) in the young entrepreneur category. He is also a storyteller and musician who has given hundreds of performances in New Brunswick, elsewhere in Canada, and in Europe. He has also taught at École W.-F.-Boisvert, in Rogersville, and contributed to implementing a philosophy program for children in kindergarten to Grade 4 classes, in cooperation with the Université de Moncton.

He previously chaired the Rogersville Local Service District Advisory Committee and was President of the Acadian Society of New Brunswick (SANB). He has served on the boards of the Kent Regional Service Commission, the Société nationale de l’Acadie (SNA), the Fédération des communautés francophones et acadienne du Canada (FCFA), and the Rogersville Cooperative. He was President of the Fédération des étudiants et étudiantes du Centre universitaire de Moncton (FÉÉCUM) and served on the Équiterre family farmers network follow-up committee.

== Political career ==
He was first elected on September 24, 2018, to represent the riding of Kent North and reelected in the 2020 provincial election.

Arseneau was the Green Party's critic in the following areas: developing and strengthening communities; food sovereignty; fiscal, economic, and social justice. He is a member of the Legislative Administration Committee, the Standing Committee on Estimates and Fiscal Policy, and the Standing Committee on Economic Policy.

On September 14, 2023, Arseneau as well as Megan Mitton were both appointed as Deputy Leaders of the Green Party of New Brunswick.

In the 2024 New Brunswick general election, he was defeated by Liberal challenger Pat Finnigan.

== Electoral record ==
2024 New Brunswick general election: Kent North
Party	Candidate	Votes	%	±%
Liberal	Pat Finnigan	3,928	44.81	+9.0
Green	Kevin Arseneau	3,251	37.09	-5.9
Progressive Conservative	Carl Cosby	1,441	16.44	-2.2
People's Alliance	Carole Boudreau	145	1.65	+1.1
Total valid votes		8,765	99.72	
Total rejected ballots		25	0.28	
Turnout		8,790	67.00	
Eligible voters		13,119		
Liberal gain from Green		Swing		+7.5
Source: Elections New Brunswick

2020 New Brunswick general election: Kent North
Party	Candidate	Votes	%	±%
Green	Kevin Arseneau	4,021	47.47	+1.55
Liberal	Bertrand LeBlanc	2,933	34.62	-2.74
Progressive Conservative	Stephen Robertson	1,363	16.09	+3.50
Independent	Roger Richard	154	1.82	-1.94
Total valid votes		8,471		
Total rejected ballots		15	0.18	-0.33
Turnout		8,486	69.44	-2.70
Eligible voters		12,220		
Green hold		Swing		+2.15
Source: Elections New Brunswick

2018 New Brunswick general election: Kent North
Party	Candidate	Votes	%	±%
Green	Kevin Arseneau	4,056	45.91%	
Liberal	Emery Comeau	3,301	37.37%	
Progressive Conservative	Katie Robertson	1,112	12.59%	
Independent	Roger Richard	194	2.20%	
New Democratic	Neil Gardner	171	1.94%	
Total valid votes		8,834	100.00%	
Total rejected ballots				
Turnout				
Eligible voters				
