= Kouchibouguacis River =

River in New Brunswick, Canada

Coordinates: 46.749742°N 64.956837°W

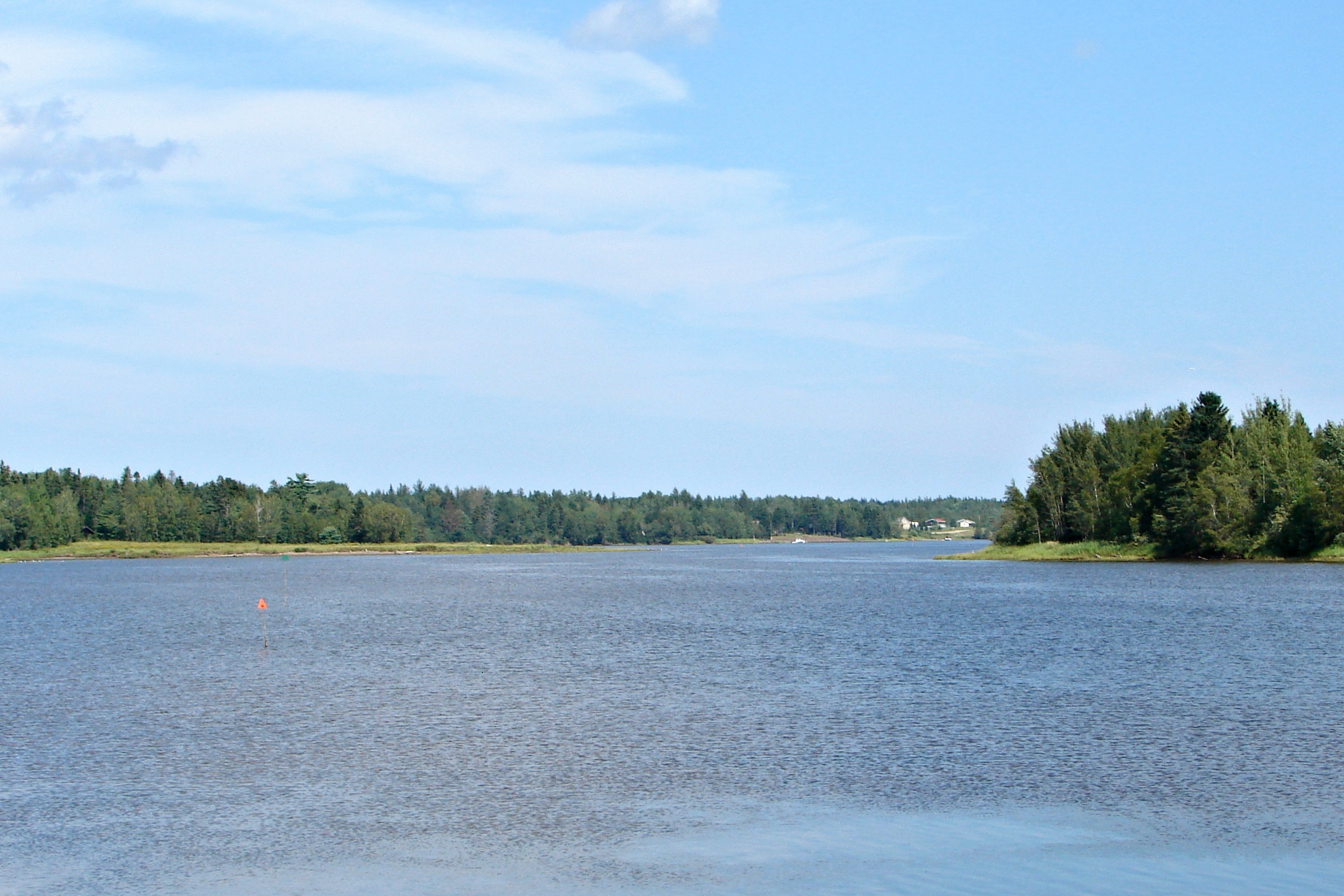
Kouchibouguacis River at St-Louis-de-Kent

The Kouchibouguacis River is a river in Saint-Louis Parish, Kent County, New Brunswick, Canada. It is a tributary of the Northumberland Strait. It is not to be confused with the Kouchibouguac River running parallel to this river, about 6 kilometres (4 mi) to the north.

== River Communities ==
- Saint-Louis-de-Kent
- Kent Junction
- Saint-Ignace

== River Crossings ==
- Route 11
- Route 126
- Route 134

== See also ==
- List of rivers of New Brunswick
