= Richibucto =

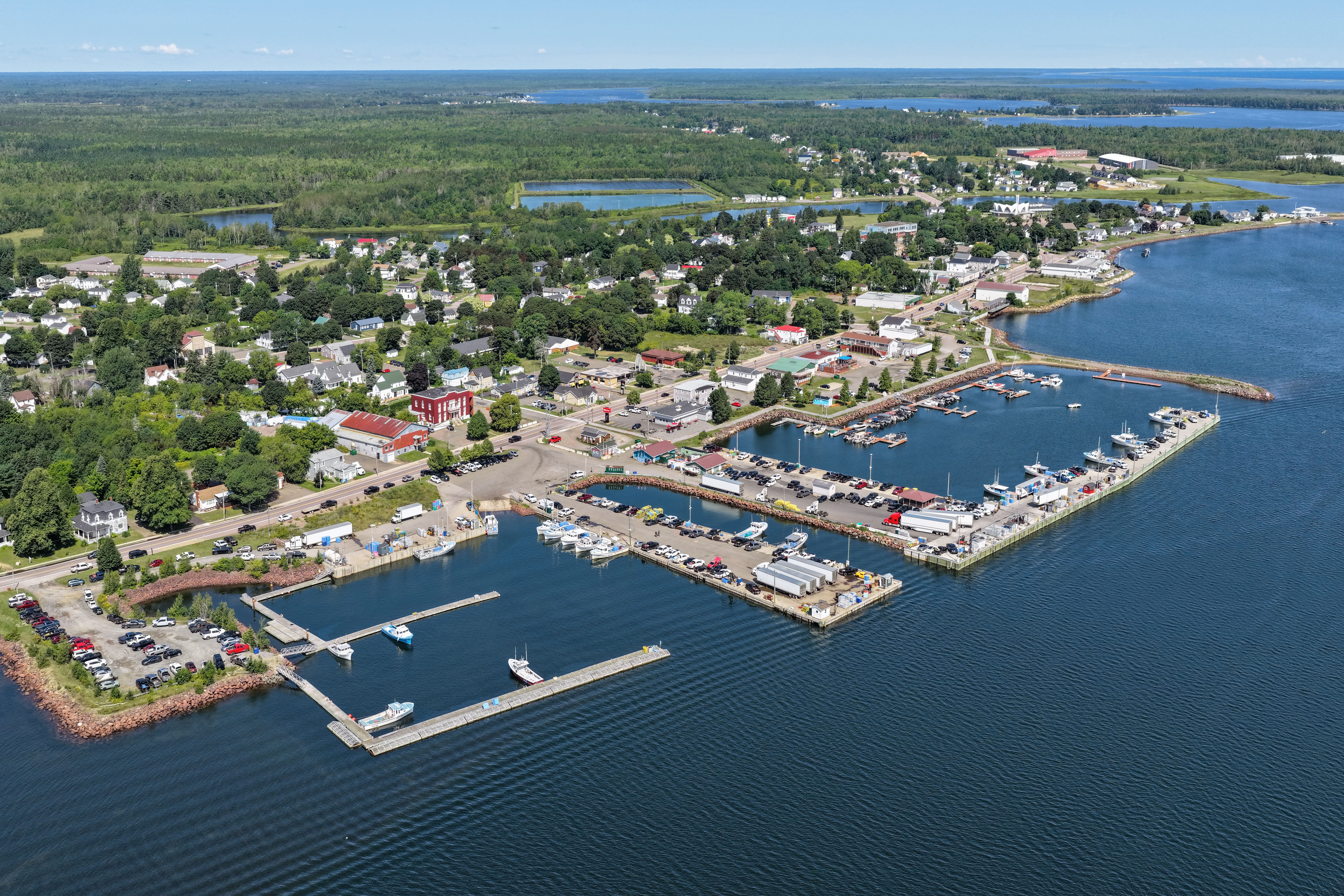

- Location within New Brunswick
- Coordinates: 46.68°N 64.87°W
- Country: Canada
- Province: New Brunswick
- County: Kent County
- Town: Beaurivage
- Founded: Early 1800s
- Incorporated: 1966

Area
  - Land: 11.90 km^{2} (4.59 sq mi)

Population (2021)
  - Total: 1,411
  - Density: 118.6/km^{2} (307/sq mi)
  - Change (2016–21): ▲11.5%
- Time zone: UTC-4 (AST)
  - Summer (DST): UTC-3 (ADT)
- Canadian Postal code: E4W
- Area code: 506
- Website: www.richibucto.org

Richibucto is a former town in Kent County, New Brunswick, Canada. It held town status prior to 2023 and is now part of the town of Beaurivage.

== Geography ==
The town is situated on the Richibucto River where it discharges into the Northumberland Strait.

== History ==
Richibucto had been the location of an annual Mi'kmaq summer coastal community prior to British colonisation. The town takes its name from "Elsipogtog" or "L'sipuktuk" Mi'kmaq terms meaning "river of fire". It is believed the term was mispronounced, or misunderstood from the Mi'kmaq language. See Elsipogtog First Nation.

On 1 January 2023, Richibucto amalgamated with the village of Saint-Louis de Kent and all or part of four local service districts to form the new town of Beaurivage. The community's name remains in official use.

== Demographics ==
In the 2021 Census of Population conducted by Statistics Canada, Richibucto had a population of 1,411 living in 649 of its 704 total private dwellings, a change of 11.5% from its 2016 population of 1,266. With a land area of 11.9 km^{2} (4.6 sq mi), it had a population density of 118.6/km^{2} (307.1/sq mi) in 2021.

Richibucto, NB Historical populations
Year	Pop.	±%
1971	1,850	—
1976	1,909	+3.2%
1981	1,722	−9.8%
1986	1,609	−6.6%
1991	1,469	−8.7%
1996	1,414	−3.7%
2001	1,341	−5.2%
2006	1,290	−3.8%
2011	1,286	−0.3%
2016	1,266	−1.6%
2021	1,411	+11.5%

Religious make-up (2001)

Religion	Population	Pct (%)
Catholic	1,285	95.90%
Protestant	45	3.36%
No religious affiliation	10	0.75%

Income (2006)

Income type	By CAD
Per capita income	$16,541
Median Household Income	$34,809
Median Family Income	$39,057

Mother tongue language (2016)

Language	Population	Pct (%)
French	805	63.39%
English	375	29.53%
Non-Official Languages	45	3.54%
Multiple responses	45	3.54%

== Economy ==
The downtown area, situated on the mouth of the river, has commercial fishing wharves, several restaurants, and local stores. The economy is dominated by lobster and deep sea fishing.

== Attractions ==
Richibucto Head Lighthouse
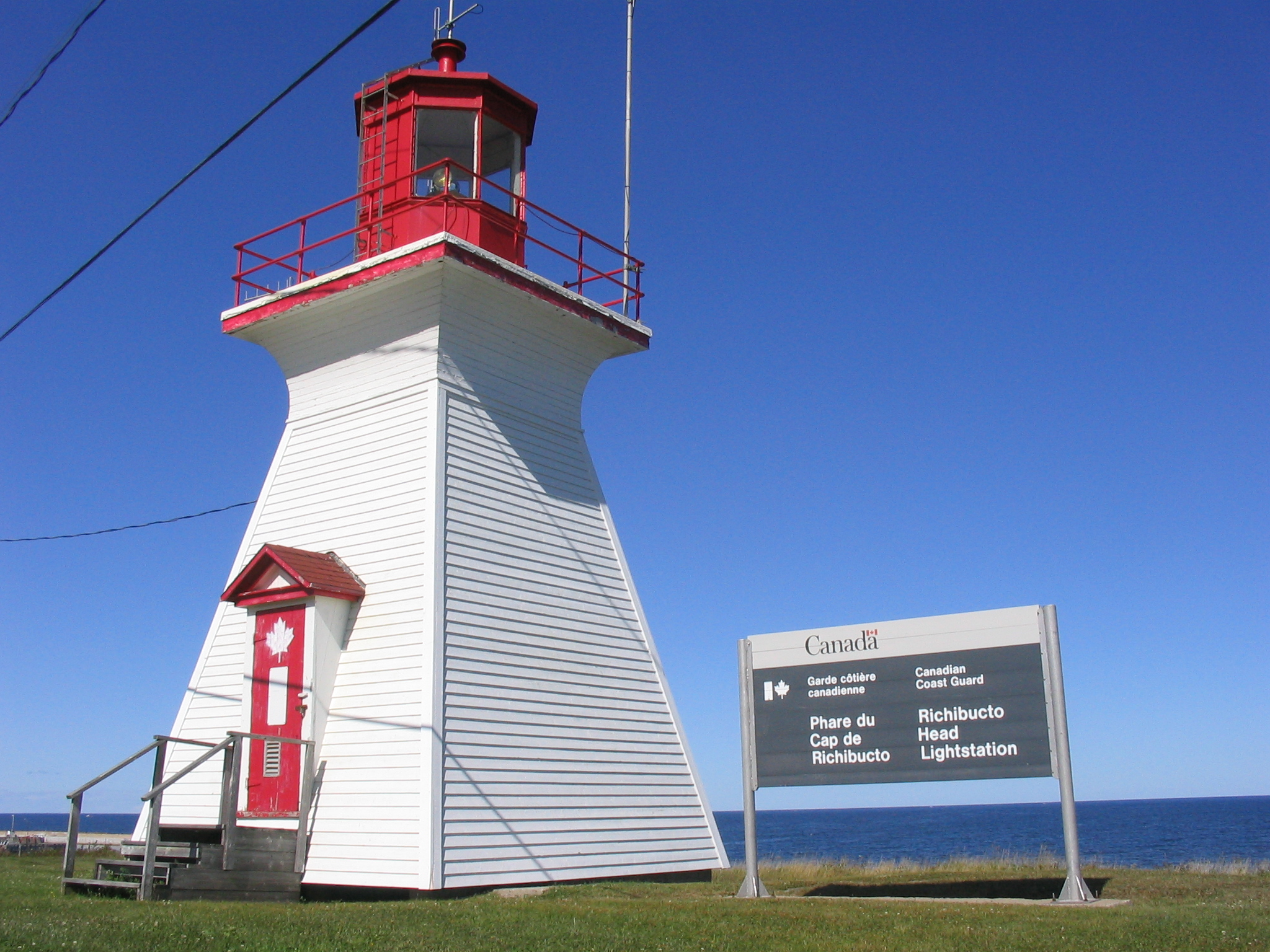
- Richibucto Head Lighthouse in 2007
- Location: Richibucto, New Brunswick, Canada
- Coordinates: 46°40′11″N 64°42′42″W

Tower
- Constructed: 1865 (first)
- Foundation: masonry base
- Construction: wooden tower
- Height: 10 m (33 ft)
- Shape: square truncated tower with balcony and lantern
- Markings: white tower, red lantern
- Operator: Canadian Coast Guard

Light
- First lit: 1901 (current)
- Deactivated: 1901 (first)
- Focal height: 18 m (59 ft)
- Lens: fourth-order Fresnel lens
- Light source: main power
- Range: 14 nmi (26 km; 16 mi)
- Characteristic: Fl W 5s

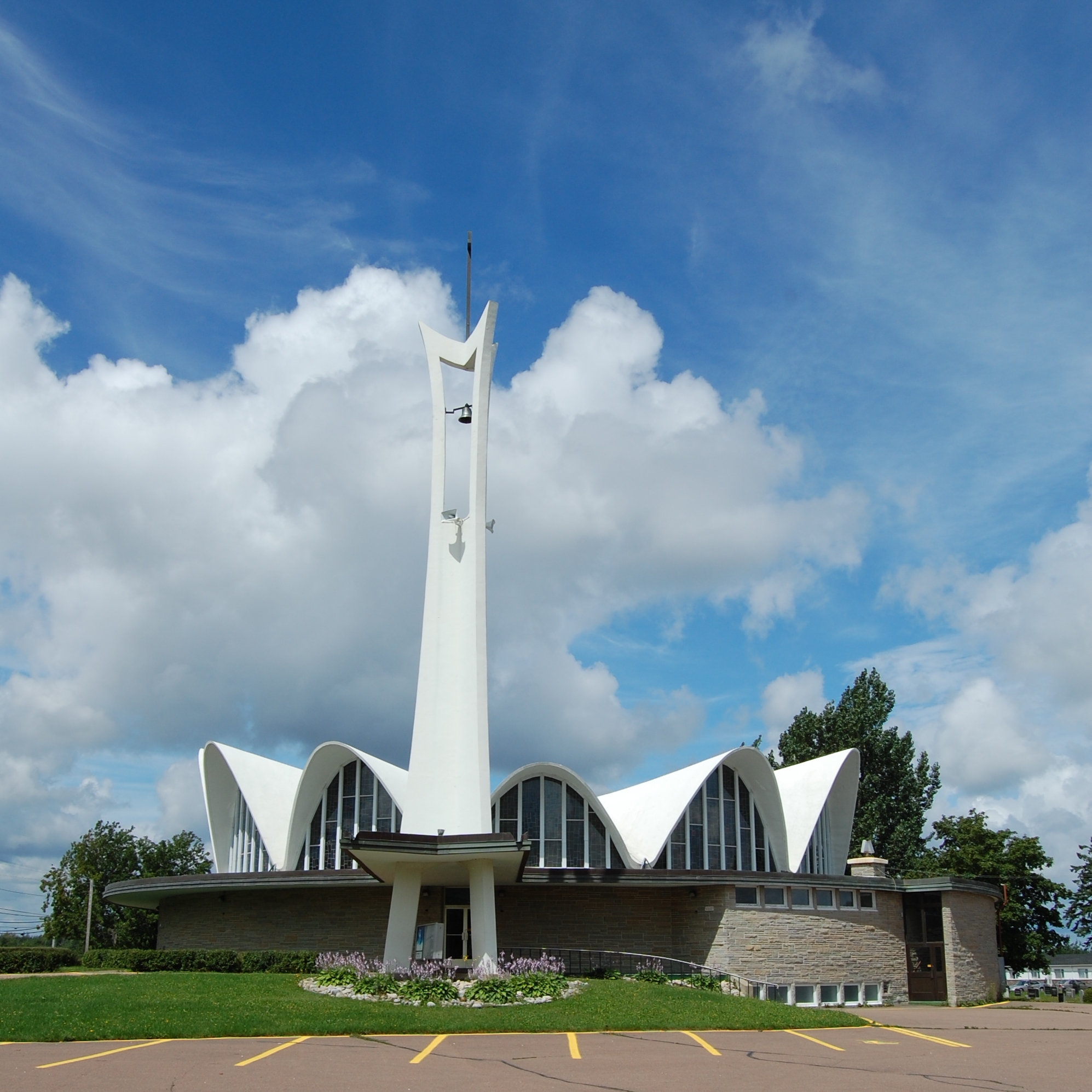
St. Louis de Gonzague Roman Catholic Church is a notable Richibucto landmark

- St. Louis de Gonzague Roman Catholic Church was completed in 1965. Designed by Belanger and Roy of Moncton, it was inspired by the designs of the Spanish architect, Félix Candela.

== Notable people ==
- Kate McPhelim Cleary (1863–1905), novelist
- Murray MacLaren (1861–1942), doctor, politician
- George McLeod (1836–1905), politician, lumber merchant, manufacturer, shipbuilder, shipowner
- James D. Phinney (1844–1915) lawyer, judge, politician
- Henry Powell (1855–1930), politician
- Louis Robichaud (1925–2005), former Premier of New Brunswick
- Peter Veniot (1863–1926), former Premier of New Brunswick
- Charles Wesley Weldon (1830–1896), lawyer, politician

== See also ==
- List of lighthouses in New Brunswick
- List of communities in New Brunswick
