= Kouchibouguac National Park =

National park in New Brunswick, Canada

Kouchibouguac National Park Parc national de Kouchibouguac (French)
- IUCN category II (national park)
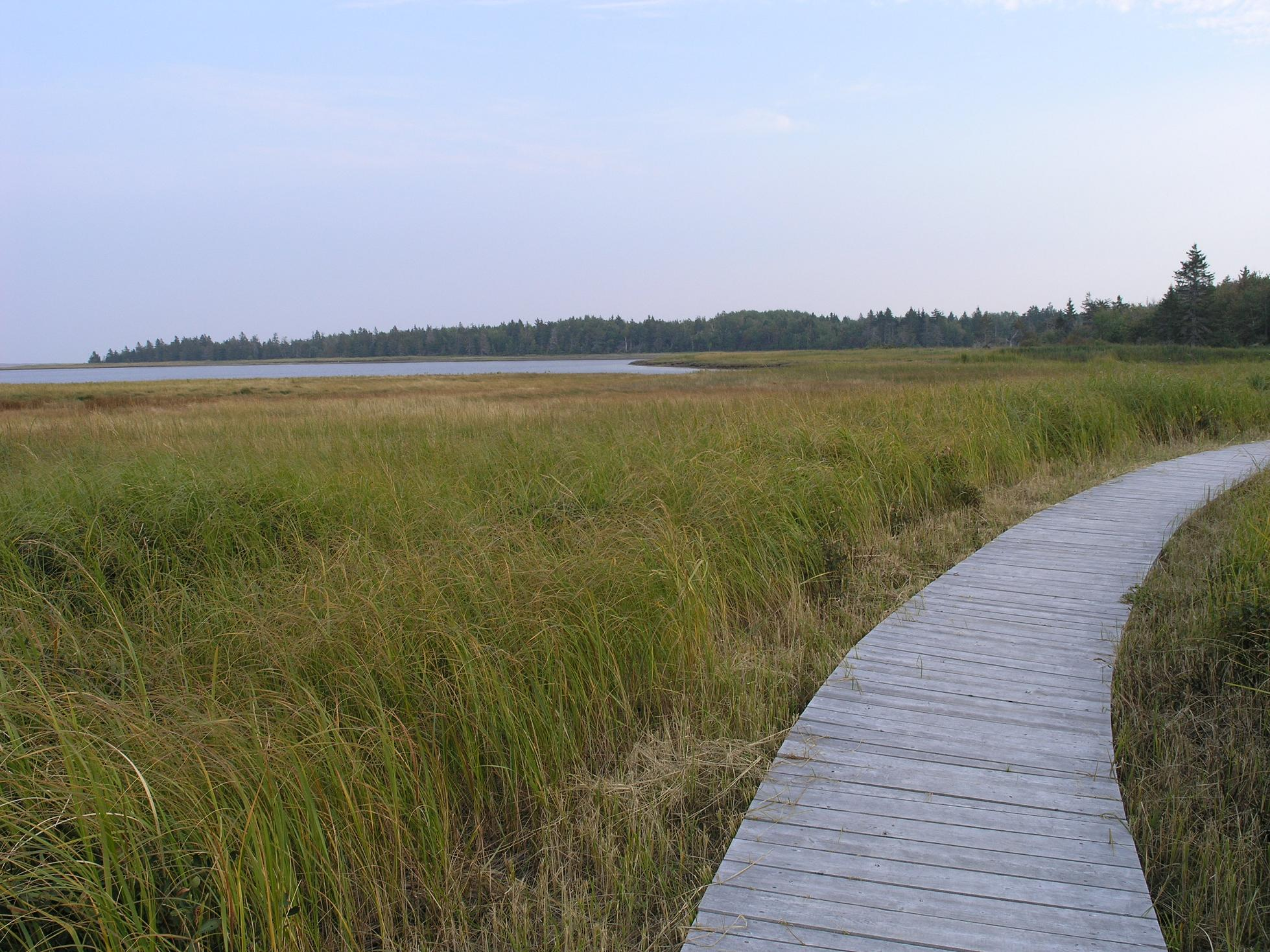
- Boardwalk over a salt marsh

- Location within Canada Location within New Brunswick
- Interactive map of Kouchibouguac National Park; Parc national de Kouchibouguac (French)
- Location: Kouchibouguac, New Brunswick, Canada
- Coordinates: 46°50′59″N 64°58′01″W
- Area: 238 km^{2} (92 sq mi)
- Established: 1969
- Visitors: 243,489 (in 2022–23)
- Governing body: Parks Canada

Kouchibouguac National Park (/kuːʃɪbuːˈɡwɑː/) is a national park located on the east coast of New Brunswick in Kouchibouguac and was established in 1969 to preserve a section of the Canadian Maritime Plain region. The park includes barrier islands, sand dunes, lagoons, salt marshes, and forests. It provides habitats for approximately 50 species protected under the Canadian Species at Risk Act, including the endangered piping plover, and the second largest tern colony in North America. Colonies of harbour seals and grey seals also inhabit the park's 25 kilometres (16 mi) of sand dunes. It is also home to the extremely rare and fragile Gulf of St. Lawrence aster, though in 2006, storms eradicated most of the asters' colonies. The park's size is 238 km^{2} (92 sq mi). Recreational activities in the park include swimming, cycling and hiking. In recent news, the park has reported sightings of the fisher marten in the area, making it one of the few places in New Brunswick that have fisher populations. The park's various public activities attract thousands of visitors each year. Kouchibouguac offers a range of activities, from various interpretation programs, to going seal watching, to a talk about Mi'kmaq band governments. The park is also home to the popular Kelly's Beach.

== History ==
The park was founded by Parks Canada in 1969 in order to set aside sensitive sand dunes and bogs. The region was used by local Indigenous Peoples, including the Mi'kmaq, for hunting, fishing, plant harvest, trade and living before European settlers arrived. Parks Canada encountered great difficulty expropriating land from numerous land owners who lived in seven nearby communities (approximately 215 families, including over 1200 individuals). These seven communities were Claire-Fontaine, Fontaine, Rivière au Portage, Kouchibouguac, Guimond Village, Cap St-Louis, and Saint-Olivier. The rules of the time dictated that all permanent residents had to be removed for a park to be created. These residents were mostly descendants of the Mi'kmaq, and the Acadians, whose ancestors had been deported. Most of these people's livelihoods depended on fishing, hunting, agriculture, forestry and tourism. The residents were generally seen as so poor that government officials believed they would benefit from having to start their lives again elsewhere. The government created courses with the intent that people might lead more productive lives. Government officials believed that they were rehabilitating the people by evicting them. The residents resisted this eviction, shutting down the park on several occasions. The most notable of these was Jackie Vautour, whose home was bulldozed in 1976, but who returned to squat there two years later, where he remained until his death on February 7, 2021. Vautour's decades-long struggle has turned him into a folk hero.

Kelly's Beach, a very long sand dune, is a popular attraction along with a number of bogs, a boardwalk trail, eight hiking trails, a network of bicycle trails, two campgrounds, canoe and boat launch and the Cap-St-Louis fishing port. However, this beauty cannot eliminate the pain experienced by the former residents, whose story is now told in a permanent exhibit at the park's Visitor Centre.

The park has a Mi'kmaq name which is reflected in the name of the Kouchibouguac River. The river's name means "river of the long tides" in Mi'kmaq. The decision to name the park in this manner did not sit well with many local residents, Acadians who wanted a name that better reflected their identity. Many wanted the park to be called Claire-Fontaine, after one of the communities that was destroyed.

As a result of the resistance to the park, Parks Canada changed its rules, so no one would ever again experience forced removal.

Other rivers that flow through the park include the:

- Black River
- Kouchibouguacis River
- Fontaine River
- Polly's Creek
- Portage River
- Rankin Brook

The story of the park had been the subject of two big budget documentaries. In addition, the park was the subject of a short film in 2011's National Parks Project, directed by Jamie Travis and scored by Casey Mecija, Don Kerr and Ohad Benchetrit. There is also a website which provides access to 26 video portraits of the people removed from their land as part of the process of creating the park.

== Fauna ==
Mammal species that inhabit on the land are raccoon, bobcat, moose, seven species of bats (Little Brown Myotis, Northern Long-eared Myotis, Tri-Colored Bat, Silver-Haired Bat, Hoary Bat, Eastern Red Bat, and Big Brown Bat), coyote, black bear, beaver, species of shrews and mice, river otter, porcupine, muskrat, woodchuck, mink, striped skunk, and snowshoe hare. Several species of birds of prey can be found at the park, such as bald eagle, hawks, owls, falcons, osprey and harriers. Colonies of common terns and grey seals also reside on the park's barrier islands.

== Management ==
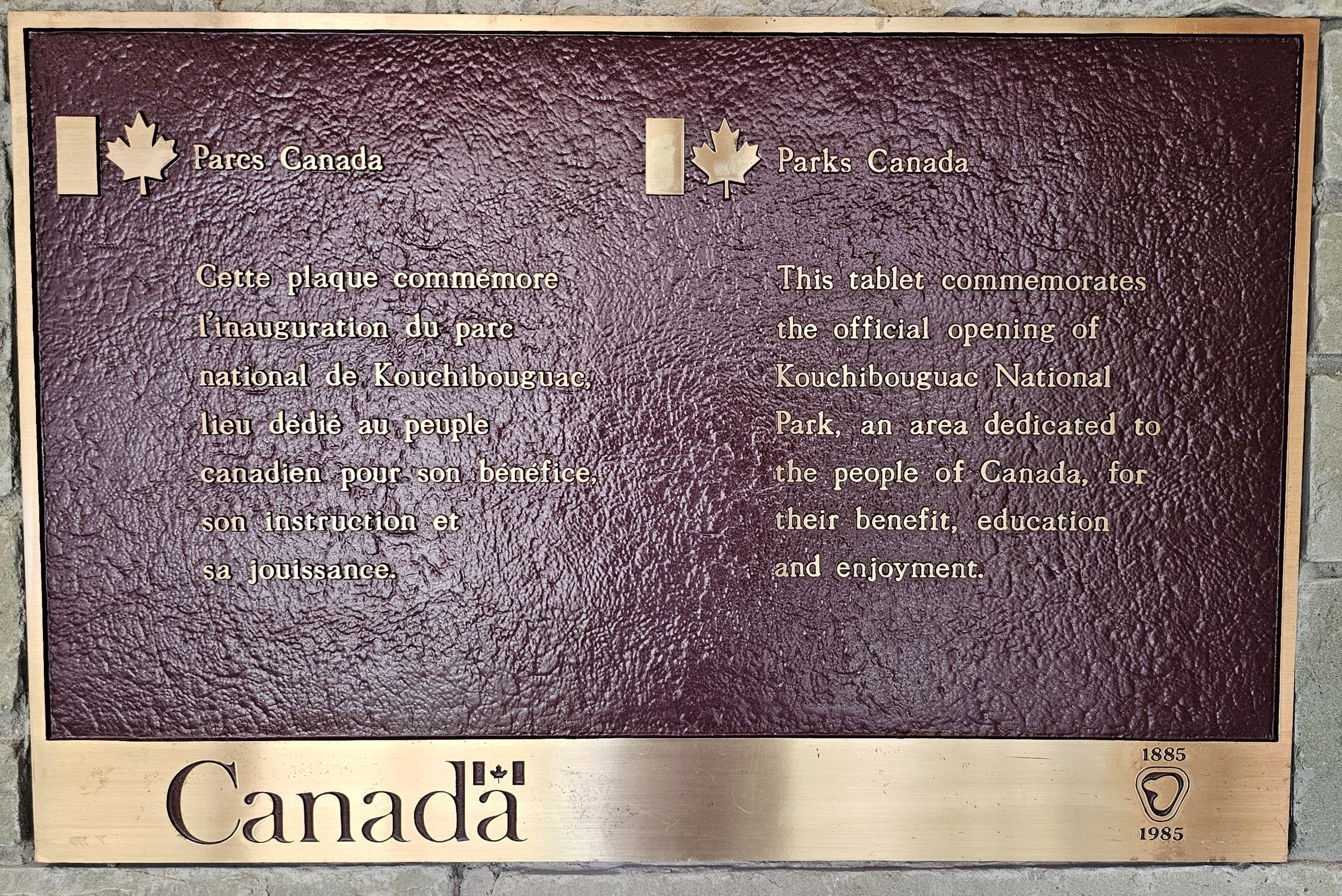
A tablet discussing the park's opening inside the visitors center

In 2009, Kouchibouguac National Park was designated as a Dark-sky preserve in order to protect nocturnal habitats, limit light pollution, and to increase appreciation for the cultural heritage associated with the night sky.

In 2010, a management plan was published outlining four "Key Strategies" pertaining to the parks management and relationship to the public. In 2017, the 2010 management plan was reviewed, including a State of the Park Assessment. Key concerns for improvement included:

- Weathering infrastructure such as roads and service buildings.
- Insufficient cultural resource preservation and access for descendant populations or visitors.
- Improving co-management relationship between stakeholders, especially between Mi'kmaq Peoples, park managers, and recognizing Indigenous values.
- Increased recreational activity, especially fishing of softshell clam and brook trout, and that the park is accessible both by land and by sea, making management of illegal activity or extreme weather events (such as wildfires or flooding) more challenging.
- Terrestrial and marine invasive species.
- Increased peripheral development projects and urbanization.
- Climate change and related symptoms, in particular sea level rise, exacerbated storms, and barrier island and dune erosion.

As of 2021, the Kouchibouguac National Park Management Plan describes a long-term plan to implement four "Key Strategies" into the park's management by 2071. The Plan was created by Parks Canada in response to both the Parks Canada Agency Act and the Canada National Parks Act, and involves a variety of stakeholders, including local Indigenous Peoples, notably the Mi'kmaq, descendants of Acadian and English permanent residents who had been expropriated to create the park, economic partners, and the Canadian public. Parks Canada is required to release an annual report on the efficacy of the Key Strategies and overall progress, and to continue to receive comments from stakeholders on the implementation of the Plan over time. Parks Canada is required to officially review the Plan at least every ten years, but may do so sooner in the interest of maintaining appropriate management strategies. The Kouchibouguac National Park Management Plan's four "Key Strategies" are summarized as:

1. "A healthy and resilient park." To properly document the environmental systems, human activity, and ecological threats in the region, and to use this information to improve its ecosystem functions and mitigate habitat degradation.
2. "A park at the forefront." To continue to present to visitors contemporary management strategies of the landscape, and to maintain modern, sustainably powered amenities and recreation where applicable.
3. "Reflection of engaged communities." To continue to include the variety of stakeholders in the decision-making process, to continue to nurture the relationships between Kouchibouguac National Park, Mi'kmaq partners, and former residents of the region, and to improve the cultural resource management of over 30 Indigenous and four non-Indigenous archaeological sites.
4. "Highly satisfied visitors throughout the year." To enhance the selection of year-round recreational and cultural activities for visitors while continuing to safeguard and promote ecological integrity, and to become an exemplary winter-season destination.

== See also ==
- National Parks of Canada
- List of national parks of Canada
- List of parks in New Brunswick
- List of trails in New Brunswick
- List of beaches in New Brunswick
