= Saint-Louis-de-Kent, New Brunswick =

Saint-Louis-de-Kent Saint-Louis de Kent
- Saint-Louis-de-Kent in 2026

- Seal
- Motto: Le berceau du drapeau acadien
- Location within New Brunswick
- Coordinates: 46.738°N 64.974°W
- Country: Canada
- Province: New Brunswick
- County: Kent County
- Town: Beaurivage
- Founded: 1797
- Village: November 9, 1966

Area
  - Land: 1.98 km^{2} (0.76 sq mi)

Population (2021)
  - Total: 981
  - Density: 494.6/km^{2} (1,281/sq mi)
  - Change (2016–21): ▲14.6%
- Time zone: UTC−4 (AST)
  - Summer (DST): UTC−3 (ADT)
- Area code: 506

Saint-Louis-de-Kent (Note: Written Saint-Louis de Kent in successive regulations defining the province's municipalities, the common form with three hyphens was normally used even by other provincial government departments.) is a former village in Kent County, New Brunswick, Canada. It held village status prior to 2023 and is now part of the town of Beaurivage.

Often shortened to simply Saint-Louis, the village is situated on the Kouchibouguacis River at the main entrance to Kouchibouguac National Park. It is considered as the birthplace of the Acadian Flag. A local park, parc des forgeron, celebrates the birth of this flag in 1884.

== History ==
Saint-Louis-de-Kent was founded by Joseph Babineau in 1797. L'Académie Saint-Louis was founded in 1874 by Father Marcel-François Richard. The Congregation of Notre-Dame of Montréal founded a convent in 1879. The academy became a college in 1876, but it was closed in 1882 by Bishop James Rogers. Additional facilities included a telephone line between Quebec and Halifax.

A religious Grotto and Calvary was erected next to the Kouchibouguacis River between 1878 and 1882, and remains an important Acadian pilgrimage site. It was declared a Heritage Site in 2005.

The Saint-Louis Caisse Populaire was founded in 1938. L'École Mgr-Marcel-François-Richard was opened in 1978.

On 1 January 2023, Saint-Louis-de-Kent amalgamated with the town of Richibucto and all or part of for local service districts to form the new town of Beaurivage. The community's name remains in official use.

== Demographics ==
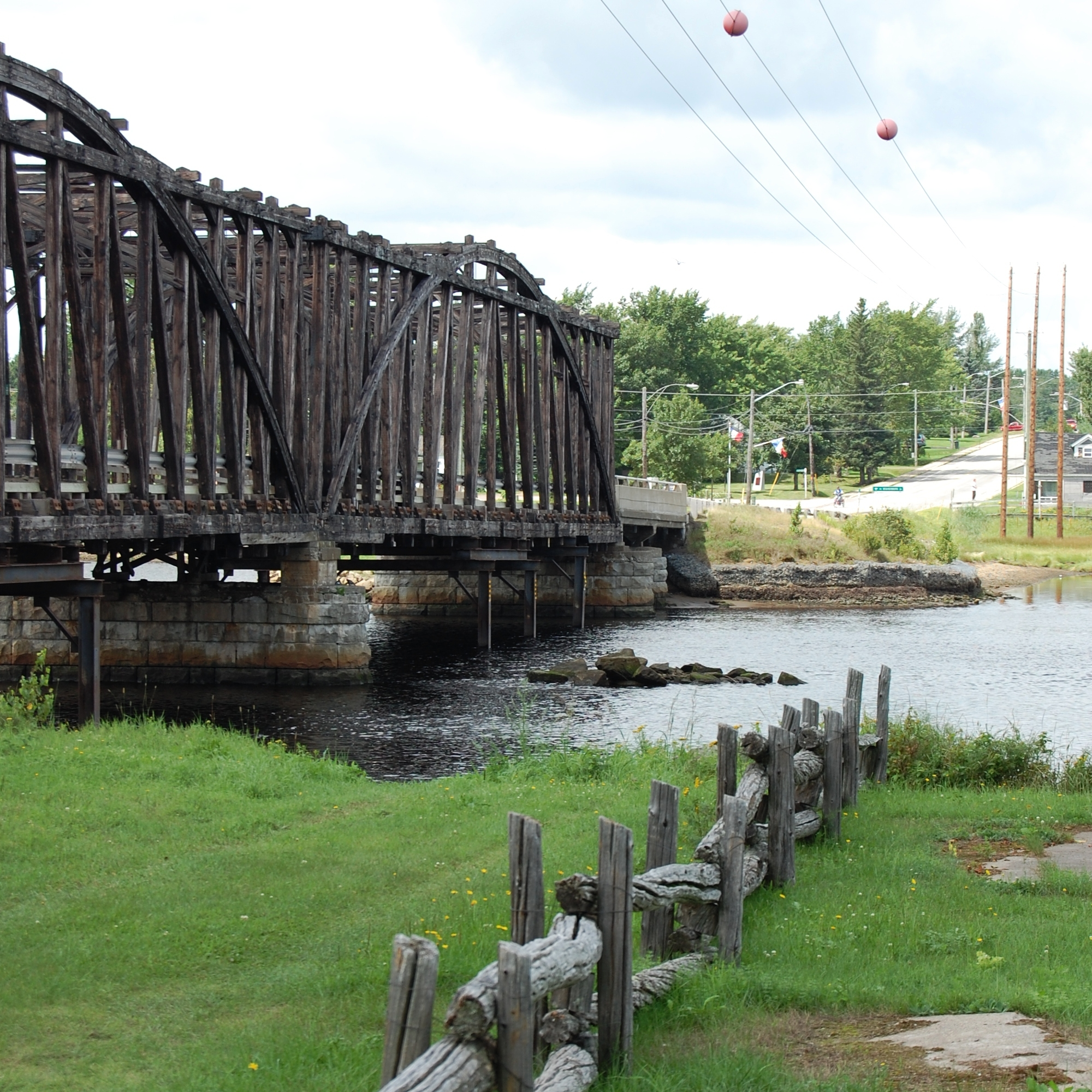
The Kouchibouguacis River flows through St. Louis de Kent. This bridge was replaced with a modern structure over a 3-year construction period, and opened in 2016.

In the 2021 Census of Population conducted by Statistics Canada, Saint-Louis de Kent had a population of 981 living in 424 of its 452 total private dwellings, a change of 14.6% from its 2016 population of 856. With a land area of 1.98 km^{2} (0.76 sq mi), it had a population density of 495.5/km^{2} (1,283.2/sq mi) in 2021.

Population trend

Census	Population	Change (%)
2021	981	▲14.6%
2016	856	▼8.0%
2011	930	▼3.1%
2006	960	▼3.2%
2001	991	▼2.4%
1996	1,015	▼0.6%
1991	1,009	▼8.4%
1986	1,101	▼5.9%
1981	1,166	N/A

Religious make-up (2001)

Religion	Population	Pct (%)
Catholic	865	94.54%
Protestant	15	1.64%
Christian, N.I.E	30	3.28%

Income (2006)

Income type	By CAD
Per capita income	$16,190
Median Household Income	$33,214
Median Family Income	$36,650

Mother tongue language (2011)

Language	Population	Pct (%)
French	715	86.14%
English	95	11.44%
English and French	20	2.41%

== See also ==
- List of communities in New Brunswick
