= Xavier Leprince =

French painter (1799–1826)

Auguste-Xavier Leprince
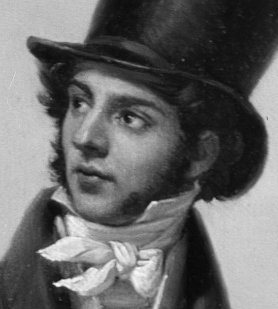
- Le jeune artiste (self-portrait; detail)
- Born: 28 August 1799; Paris, France
- Died: 26 December 1826 (aged 27); Nice, France
- Years active: 1816-1826
- Works: Embarquement de bestiaux sur le Passager dans le port de Honfleur (painting, 1823), Inconvéniens d'un Voyage en Diligence (lithographs, 1826), The Artist's Studio (painting, 1827)
- Father: Anne-Pierre Leprince
- Relatives: Léopold Leprince (brother), Gustave Leprince (brother)

Signature
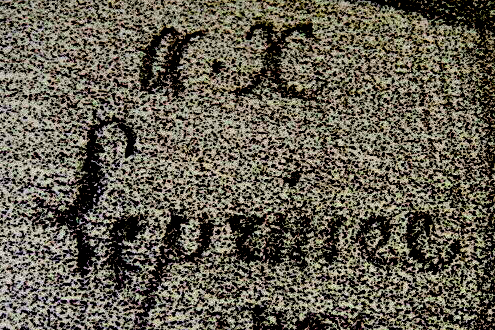

Auguste-Xavier Leprince (August 28, 1799 – December 26, 1826) was a French artist and painter who attained celebrity at the age of seventeen. His patrons included the Duchesse de Berry, Charles X, and Alexandre du Sommerard. He was also a teacher; in his twenties he established his own atelier in Paris, with pupils including his two younger brothers, Robert-Léopold and Pierre-Gustave, as well as Eugène Lepoittevin and Nicolas Alexandre Barbier. His meteoric career came to an abrupt end and his "brilliant promise was cut short by his premature death at the age of twenty-seven."

== Early success with pastoral subjects ==
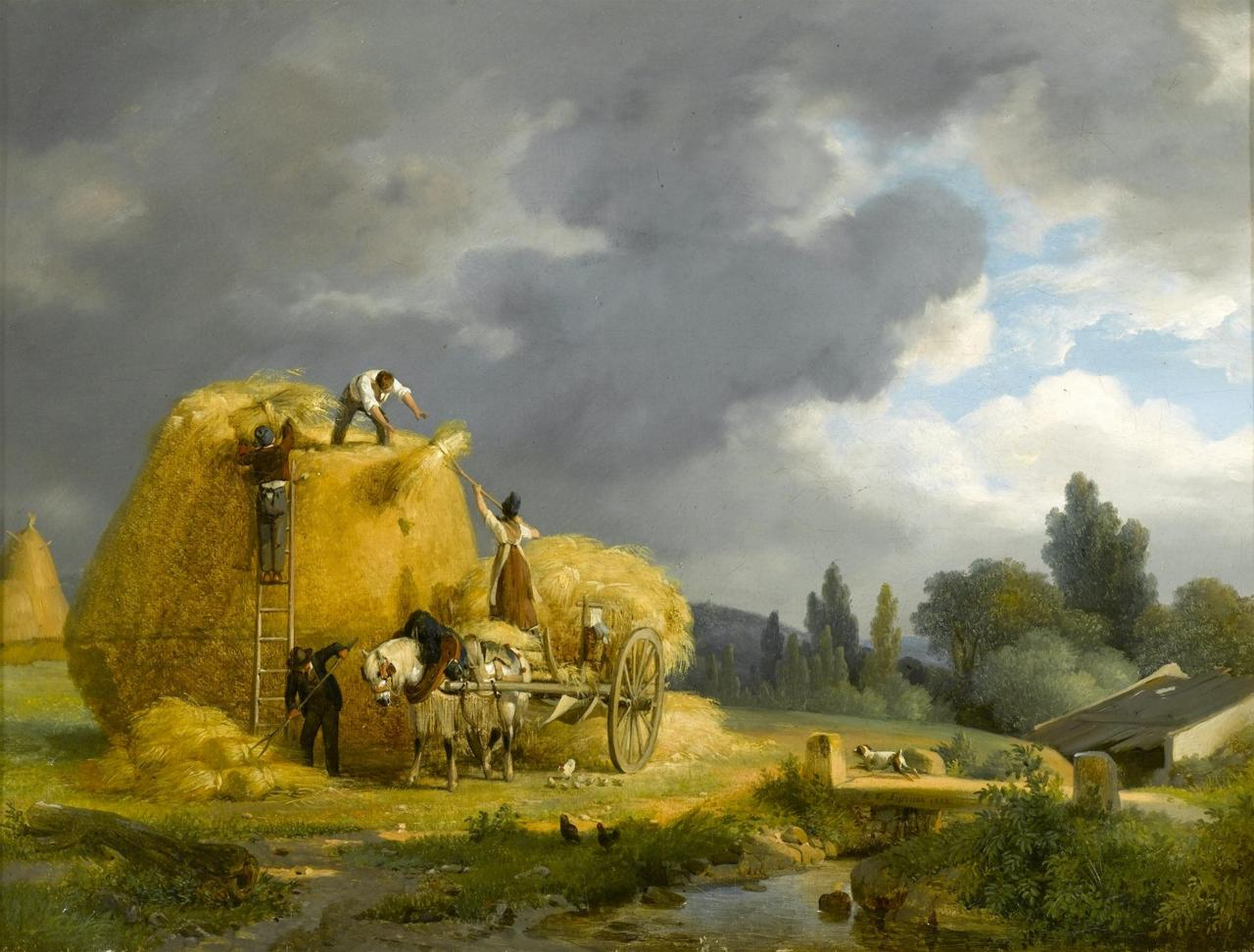
La moisson (The Harvest), private collection, 1822. First owned by the Duchesse de Berry, the painting set a record for a work by Leprince when it was actioned for €60,000 at Christie's in Paris in 2007.

Xavier Leprince was born in Paris, the son of Anne-Pierre Leprince (said to be a painter and lithographer, but about whom little is known) and Marie-Adélaïde-Florentine Datir. Alexandre du Sommerard, who became one of his patrons, indicates that Xavier was essentially a self-taught artist, saying his early paintings were created "almost without any other guide than nature."

His earliest known works, dating from 1816 to 1819, mostly depict livestock and their keepers in pastoral settings. These precocious works gained for the teenaged Leprince "a celebrity confirmed by the exorbitant prices set, by the merchants themselves, for his first productions." Art historians see in these early works the influence of 17th-century Dutch landscape and animal painters Adriaen van de Velde, Adriaen van Ostade and Isaac van Ostade, and the French landscape artist Jean-Louis de Marne.

Leprince made his salon debut at age nineteen, exhibiting six paintings, all landscapes or rural subjects, at the Paris Salon of 1819, where he was awarded a medal.

His expertise at depicting farming life in rural France reached a new level with his 1822 work La moisson, a painting of laborers harvesting a field, which was purchased by Marie-Caroline de Bourbon-Sicile, duchesse de Berry, who also collected Leprince's 1823 painting of ice-skaters, Les Patineurs. She may also have commissioned from Leprince a painting depicting guests listening to music in her grove at the Hermitage of Enghien at Montmorency, known from a lithograph.

Leprince's 1823 painting, Embarquement des bestiaux sur le Passager dans le port de Honfleur (Embarkation of Cattle on the Passager at the Port of Honfleur), emblematic of the cattle paintings of the era, was of singular importance to his career. Féréol Bonnemaison wrote that it "placed M. Leprince among our best genre painters. His career is now gloriously open before him." The painting was purchased by Charles X for 3,000 francs, and is now in the Louvre.

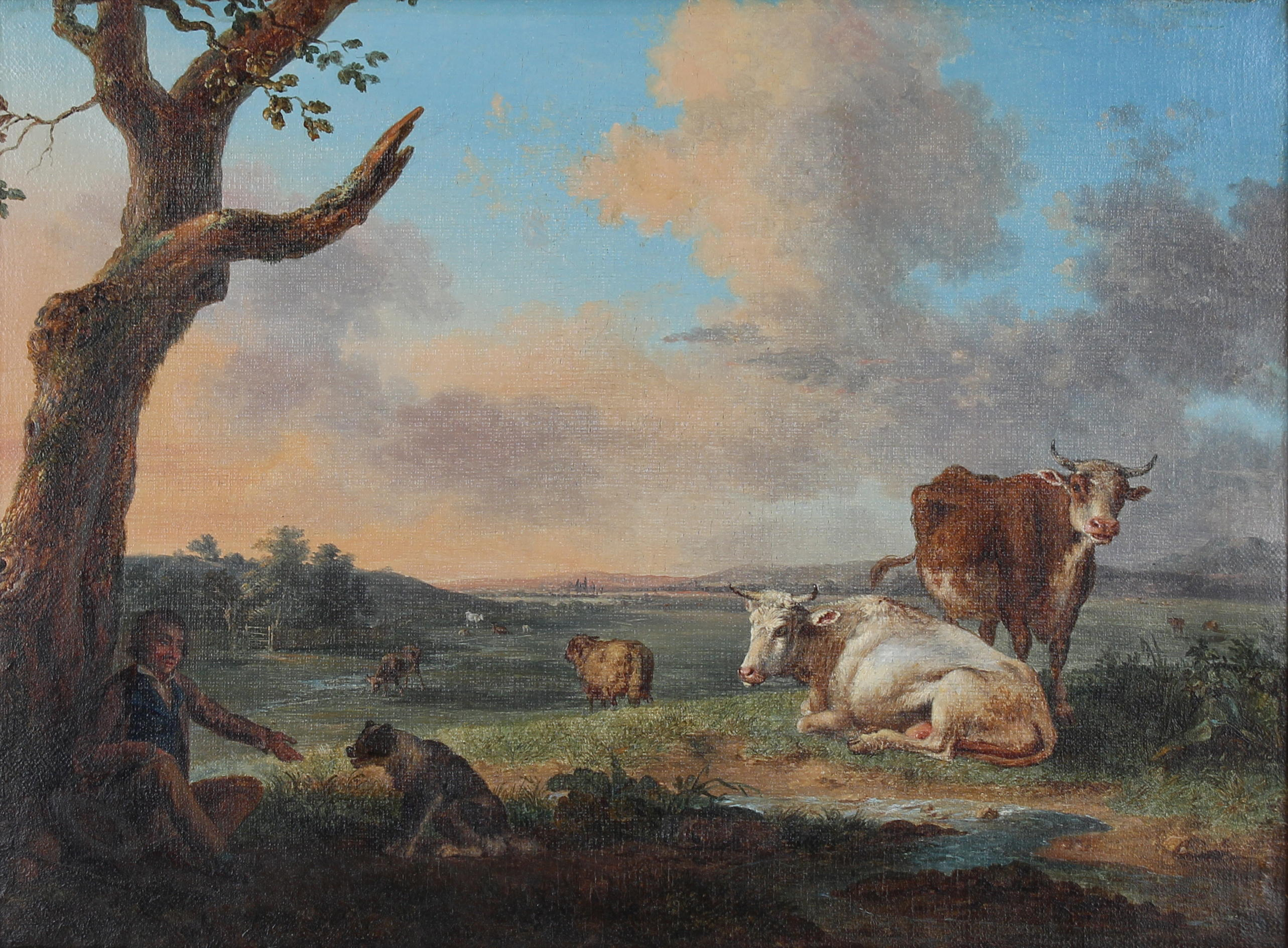
Pastoral scene, 1816, private collection.

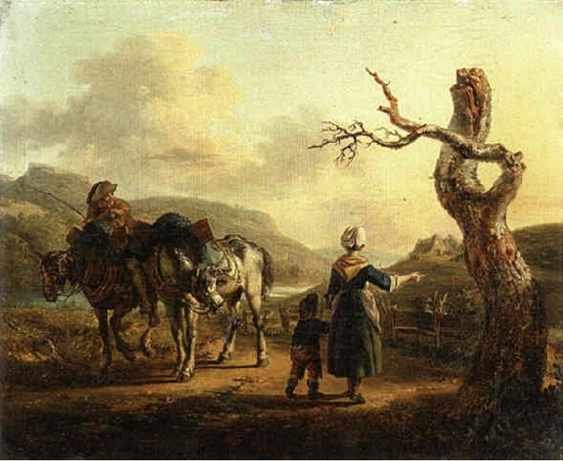
Taveler, mother and child, 1816, private collection.

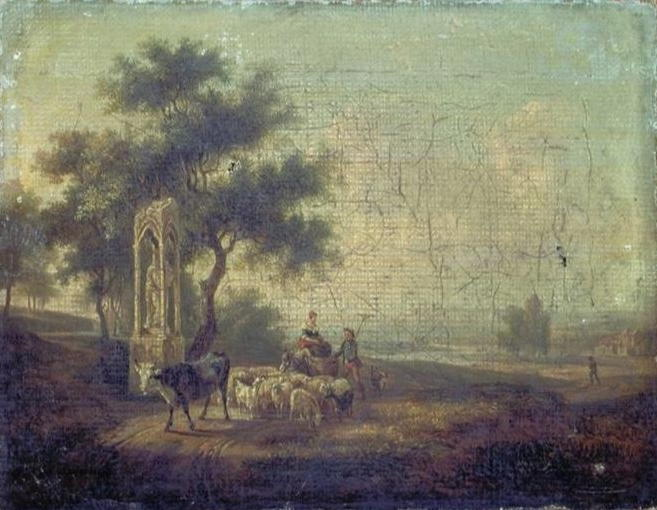
Paysage, bergere sur un ane, 1817, Musée des Beaux-Arts de Bordeaux.

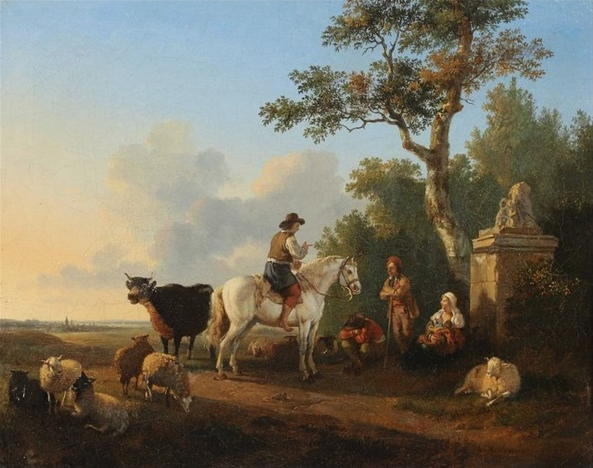
Le repos des bergers sur le chemin, 1818, private collection.

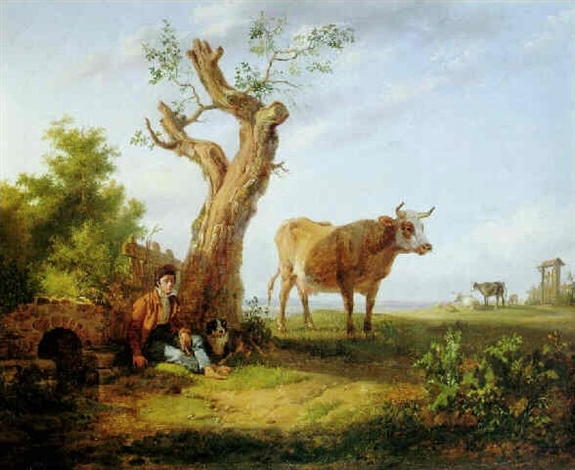
Le berger, son chien et son troupeau, 1819, private collection.

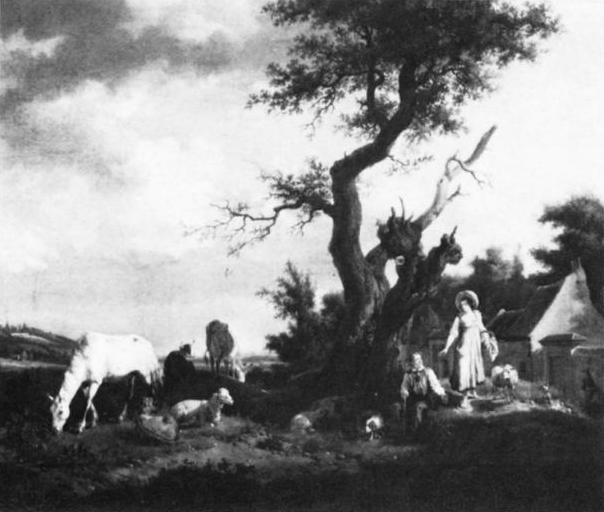
Rustic Pleasures, 1819, private collection.

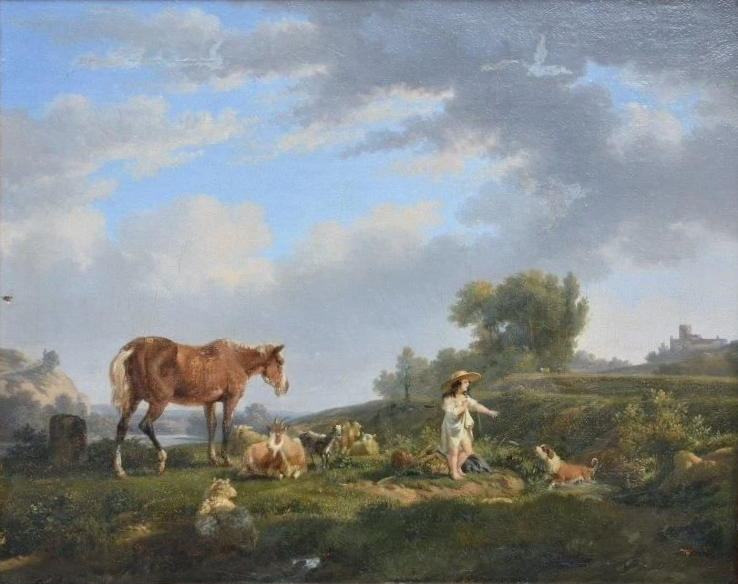
Paysage à la fermière et au cheval, undated (c. 1816-1819), private collection.

== Other genres ==
Moving beyond pastoral subjects, Leprince also painted marine art, scenes of Parisian life, works in the troubadour style, portraits, and the Forest of Fontainebleau, which had just begun to attract a new generation of French artists.

He also specialized in painting the human figures for a number of landscape painters, including Nicolas Alexandre Barbier, Étienne Bouhot, Alexandre-Hyacinthe Dunouy, André Giroux, Charles-Caïus Renoux, and Henri Édouard Truchot. This practice of being a "general contractor" to artists "who do not have the courage to study the figures of men or animals to adorn their works" was criticized by one writer, who argued that it would surely "detach many jewels from his crown in public esteem." The critic nonetheless praised Leprince's "wit, verve, originality, finesse, and great facility in composition and execution."

Leprince's skill at figure painting was appreciated by Corot, and Vincent Pomarède speculates that Corot was influenced by Leprince.

Works such as the watercolor A Ceremony on the Capitoline Hill in Rome, dated 1821, provide evidence of travel to Italy.

In 1822, from the Société des Amis des Arts, Leprince received a commission to commemorate the valiant efforts of French doctors and nuns who had traveled to Barcelona in response to an epidemic of yellow fever, which killed an estimated 20,000 inhabitants. The resulting painting was an ambitious panorama with more than forty figures, variously called Peste de Barcelone or Les Médecins français et les Sœurs de Saint-Camille à Barcelone. La Nouveauté called it a "very remarkable" work "which announced a very distinguished talent." The painting was praised and minutely described by Charles Paul Landon in a volume of his Annales du Musée et de l'École moderne des beaux-arts, which included a fold-out reproduction, currently the only known image of Leprince's painting.

In 1824, inspired to paint the coast of Normandy, Leprince began sharing a studio with Eugène Isabey at Honfleur.

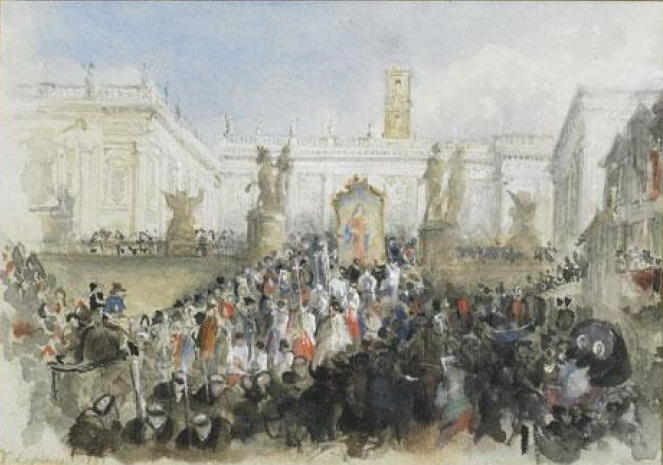
A Ceremony on the Capitoline Hill in Rome, watercolor, 1821, private collection.

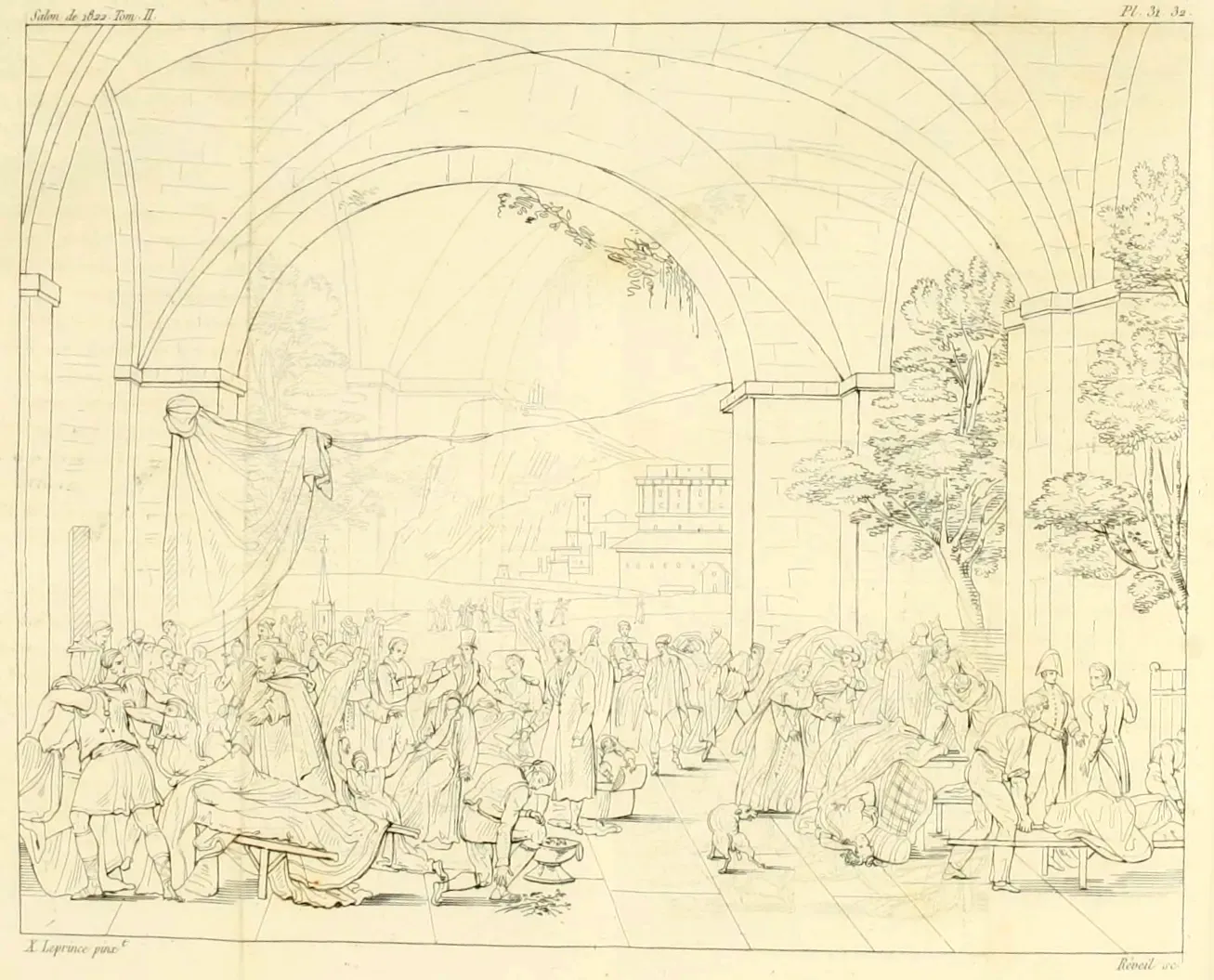
Peste de Barcelone, lithograph of painting of 1822.

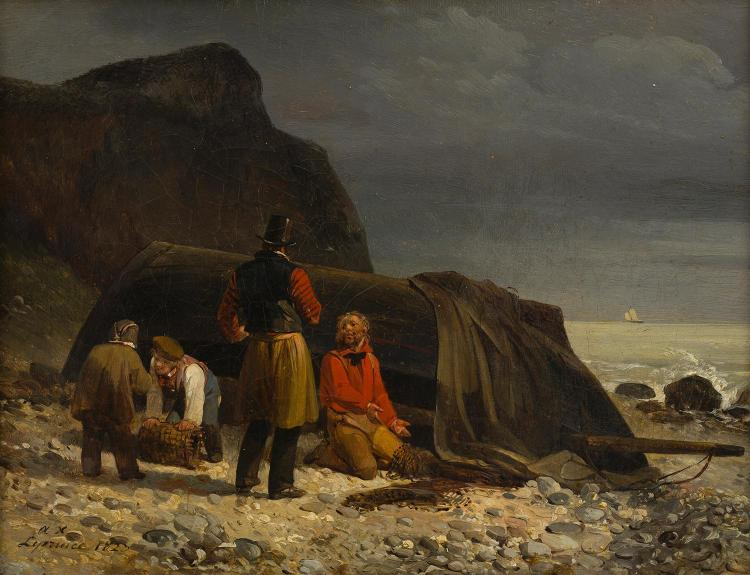
Preparing the Nets, 1823, private collection.

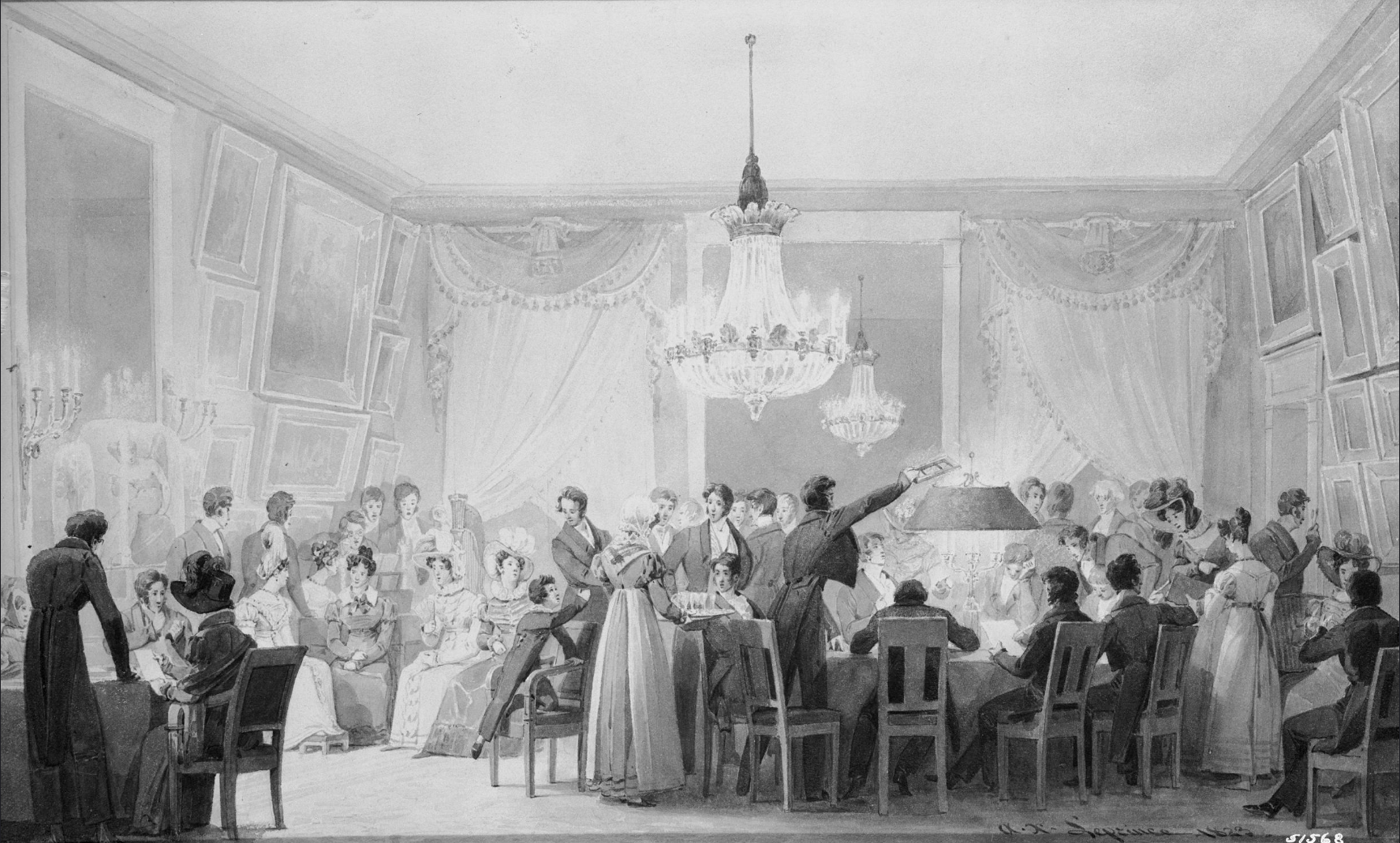
Salon littéraire, photographic reproduction of drawing dated 1823.

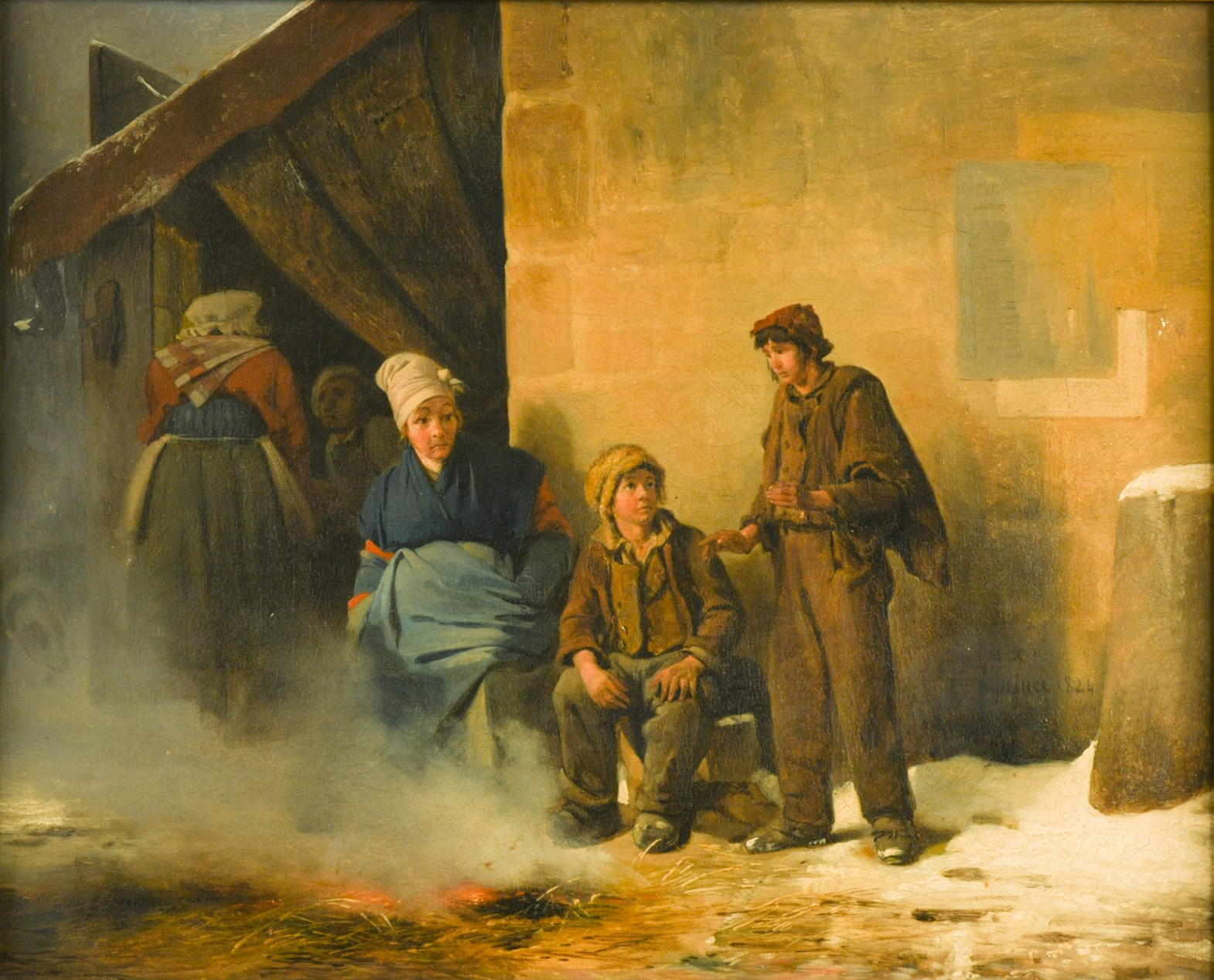
Peasants by a fire, 1824, private collection.

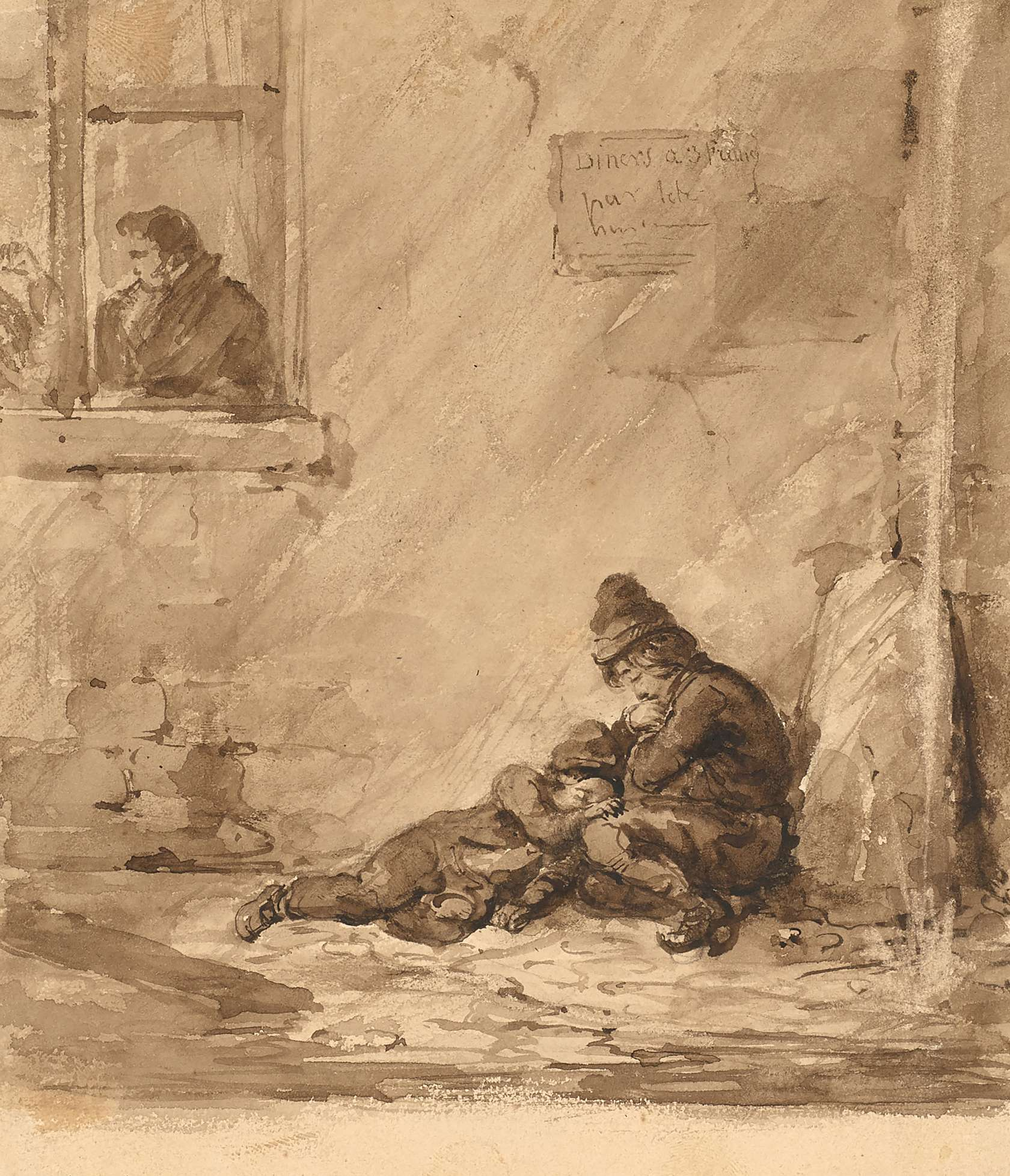
Confort et misère à Paris, Nationalmuseum, Stockholm, undated.

== Patronage of du Sommerard ==
By 1822, the year Leprince turned 23, his talents as a painter had attracted the patronage of the antiquarian Alexandre du Sommerard, whose collection of medieval art and artifacts would become the Musée de Cluny. Du Sommerard included lithographs of four works by Leprince in his highly influential Vues de Provins, which also included four works by Xavier's younger brother, Léopold Leprince. The book, an illustrated tour of medieval churches and abbeys, many of them reduced to ruins in the violence of the French Revolution, was part of an artistic and literary movement, the troubadour style, that romanticized the Middle Ages in France. About Leprince's Vue de la partie des fortifications dite le Trou du Chat, the art historian Pierre Bénard writes, "Is there not something Virgilian in the peaceful herd immortalized by Xavier Leprince at the foot of a tower of the ramparts?"

At the Paris Salon of 1824, Leprince exhibited a full-length portrait of his patron, listed in the catalogue as Portrait en pied de M. du S… dans son cabinet. Its location is unknown.

At the time of his death, Leprince left unfinished two paintings commissioned by du Sommerard. One was The Artist's Studio. The other depicted an elderly collector conferring with a Jewish antiques dealer and surrounded by prized artifacts from his collection, entitled L’Antiquaire (The Antiquarian). To complete this painting, du Sommerard commissioned another of his protégés, Charles-Caïus Renoux, who did so "with rare talent." It was displayed in the Paris Salon of 1827. A contemporary reviewer noted that "at the time of Xavier Leprince's death, the two figures alone were made, and the rest was hardly sketched out. It is M. Renoux who was commissioned to complete this interior," consisting of furniture, armor, and numerous objets d'art from the Middle Ages; "finally everything comes together to make this painting a precious piece." The contemporary critic Auguste Jal declared the painting "a perfect work." L’Antiquaire has been cited by modern scholars researching the history of antiquarianism and the invention of the modern museum.

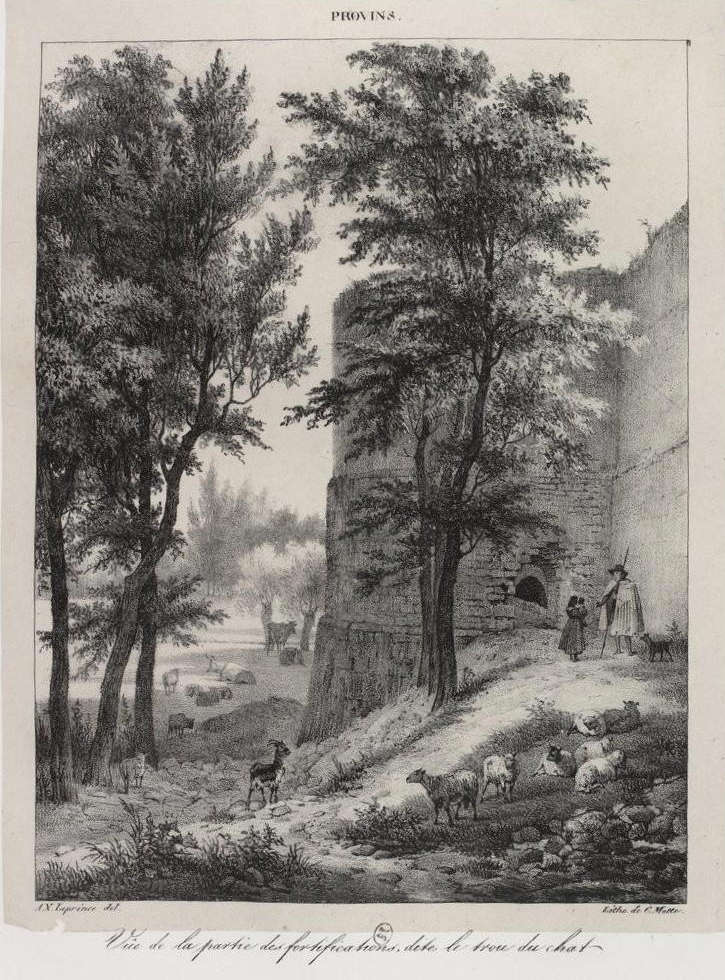
Vue de la partie des fortifications dite le Trou du Chat, from Vues de Provins, 1822.

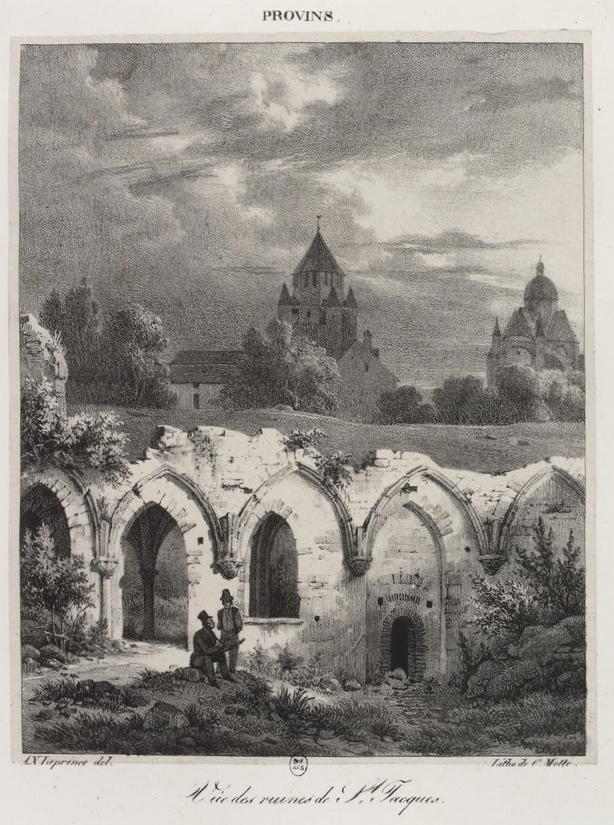
Vue des ruines de Saint-Jacques, from Vues de Provins, 1822.

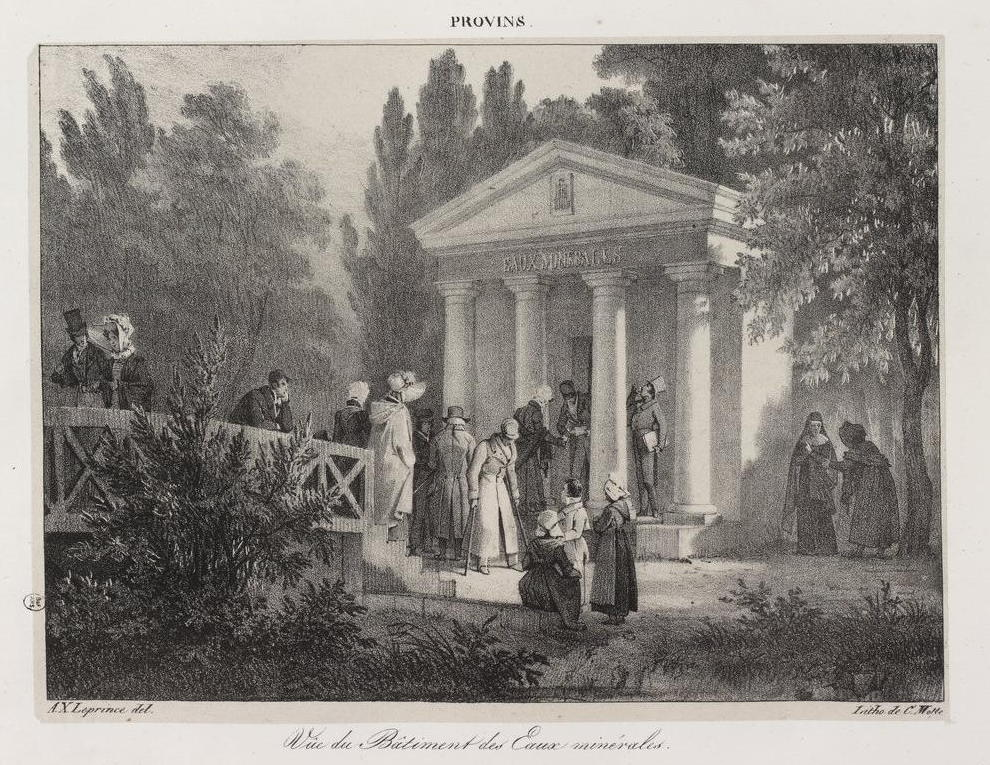
Vue du Bâtiment des Eaux Minérales, from Vues de Provins, 1822.

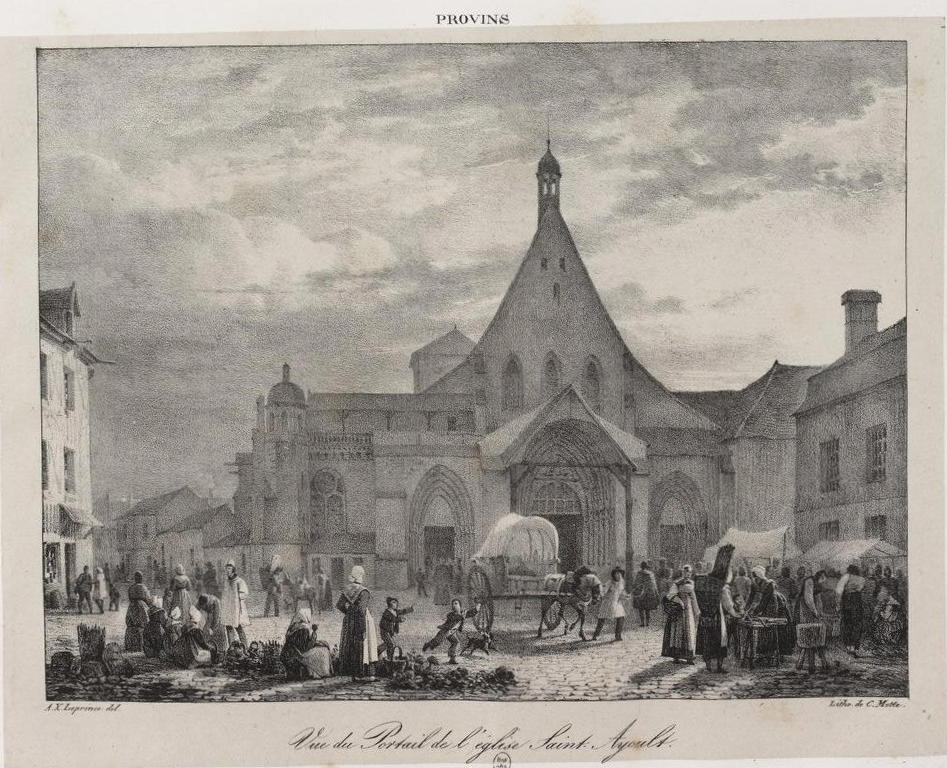
Vue du Portail de l'église de Saint-Ayoul, from Vues de Provins, 1822.

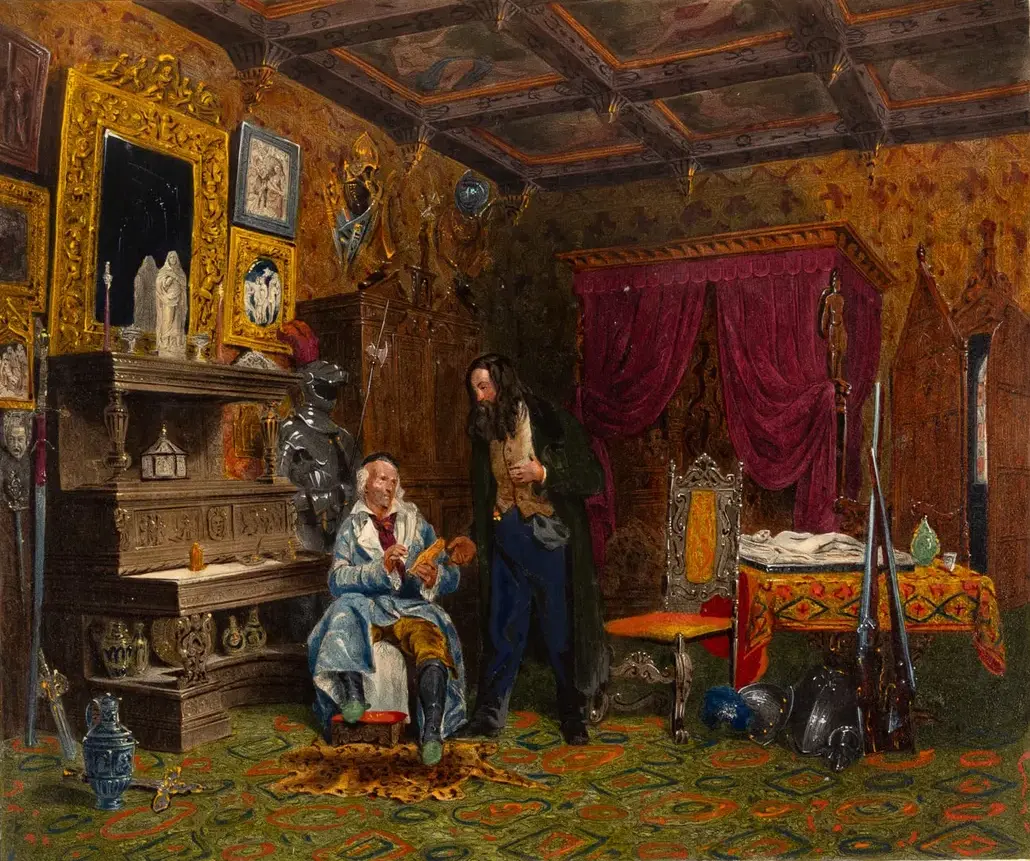
L'Antiquaire, finished by Charles-Caïus Renoux, 1827

== The Artist's Studio and artists en plein air ==
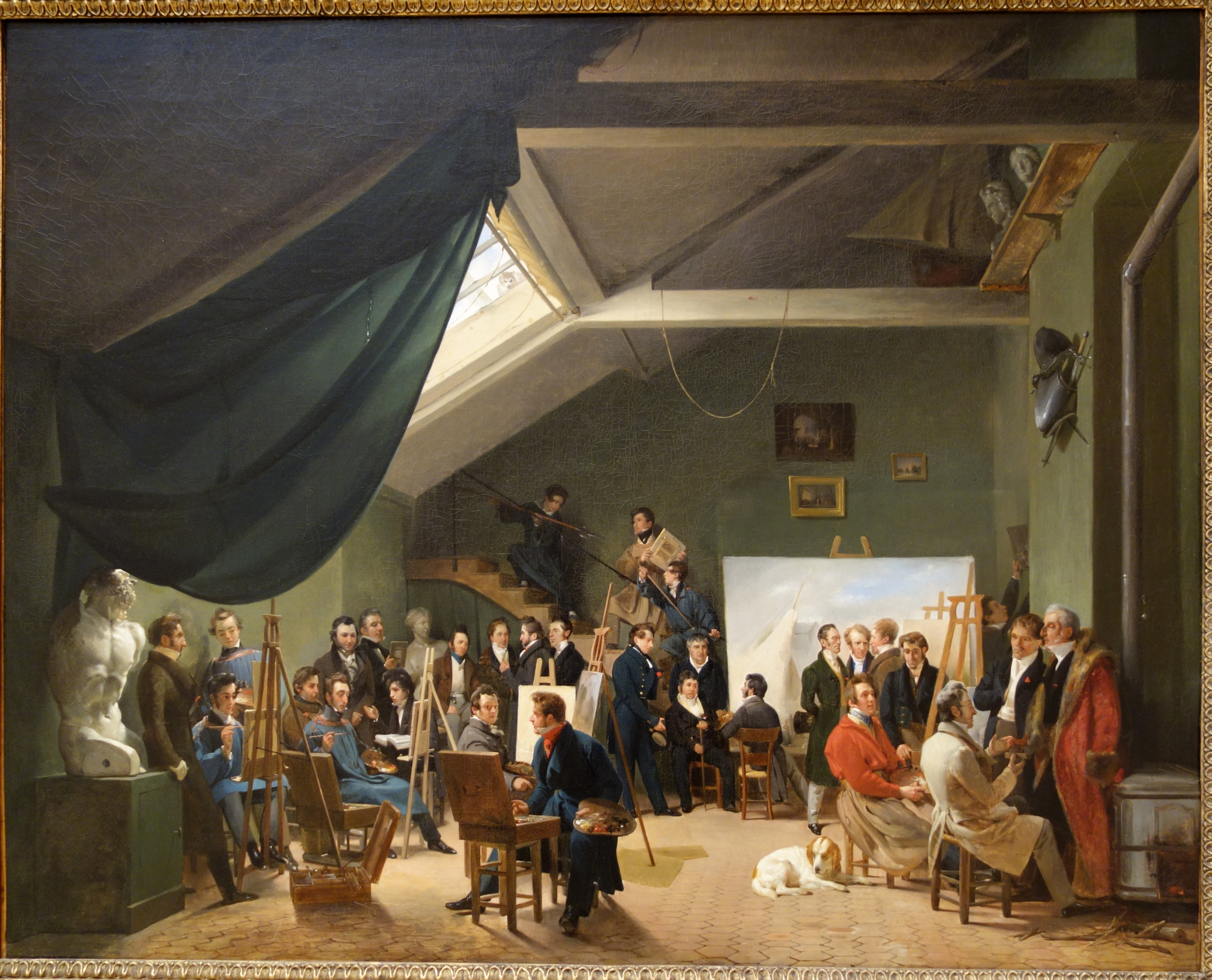
The Artist's Studio (completed by Eugène Lepoittevin), 1827, Chazen Museum of Art.

At an unusually early age, especially if he was in fact a self-taught painter, Leprince opened an atelier and accepted pupils. In the last year of his life he began work on a highly detailed painting depicting himself and his circle of artists, students, and patrons, following in the tradition of atelier paintings such as Louis-Léopold Boilly's Gathering of Artists in the Studio of Isabey (1798).

The highly detailed canvas shows how artists worked, what tools were used, and how brushes were held. Plaster casts of well-known classical sculptures, including the Laocöon and the Venus de Milo, are displayed around the room. Two classical busts, perched high on a shelf at right, appear to look down like spectators on the informal assembly of students, patrons, and critics. Leprince is the figure seen from the back in profile seated before the large painting to the right of center. The canvas he is working on is Loading of Livestock at Honfleur, which he exhibited in the Paris Salon of 1824 and was purchased two years later by King Charles X of France. The inscription on the stretcher notes that this painting was commissioned by M. du Sommerard, Leprince's chief patron. In 1869 it was purchased by Octave de Labastie, the figure seated before an easel, fifth from the left.

Leprince's painting

includes no fewer than seven easels and nine painters with spectators. The focus is not on a single artist, in other words, but on several different ones. The studio was in a property called “la Childebert”, after its address at 9, rue Childebert (Paris), close to what is now the boulevard Saint-Germain-des-Prés in the sixth arrondissement of Paris. Here Auguste-Xavier Leprince shared a studio with his brothers, Robert-Léopold (1800–1847) and Gustave Leprince (1810–1837)…Preliminary studies are preserved in the Musée Magnin in Dijon, including for the group of figures to the left and for another in the background…A distinguishing feature of both the studies and the finished painting is the individual character of the people represented, showing that they were intended to be identifiable. They presumably included not just some of the main artists of the neighbourhood, but also no doubt prominent officials and collectors…The ambitious studio interior with some thirty figures which Leprince painted the year he died was a commemorative portrait of the three brothers and their immediate circle designed to impress, but also with an element of humour.

The painting was unfinished at the time of Leprince's death. To finish it, Du Sommerard commissioned one of Leprince's pupils, Eugène Lepoittevin. When it was exhibited at the Paris Salon of 1827, the catalogue noted: "Of the thirty figure-portraits included in the composition, nineteen had been completed by Mr. Xavier Leprince before his premature death; the eleven others and various details are by the hand of Mr. Eugène Potdevin [sic]." The second figure from left, seated at an easel, is thought to be a portrait of Lepoittevin, either by his own hand or by that of Leprince. Another artist known to appear in the painting is Augustin Enfantin (1793-1827), but the figure depicting him has not been identified. Du Sommerard presumably appears, but his image has not been identified.

In 1982, The Artist's Studio was acquired by the Chazen Museum of Art at the University of Wisconsin–Madison. Two oil on canvas works which appear to be studies for the painting are in the collection of the Musée Magnin in Dijon. Intérieur d'atelier depicts the figure thought to be Leprince in the finished painting, seated before a blank canvas; Le Peintre dans son atelier depicts the seated figure thought to portray Eugène Lepoittevin.

In the years leading up to The Artist's Studio, Leprince made numerous studies of artists, notably Studio Interior with Artists Working (1820), now in the Nationalmuseum, Stockholm, and many drawings of artists in sketchbooks held by the Louvre.

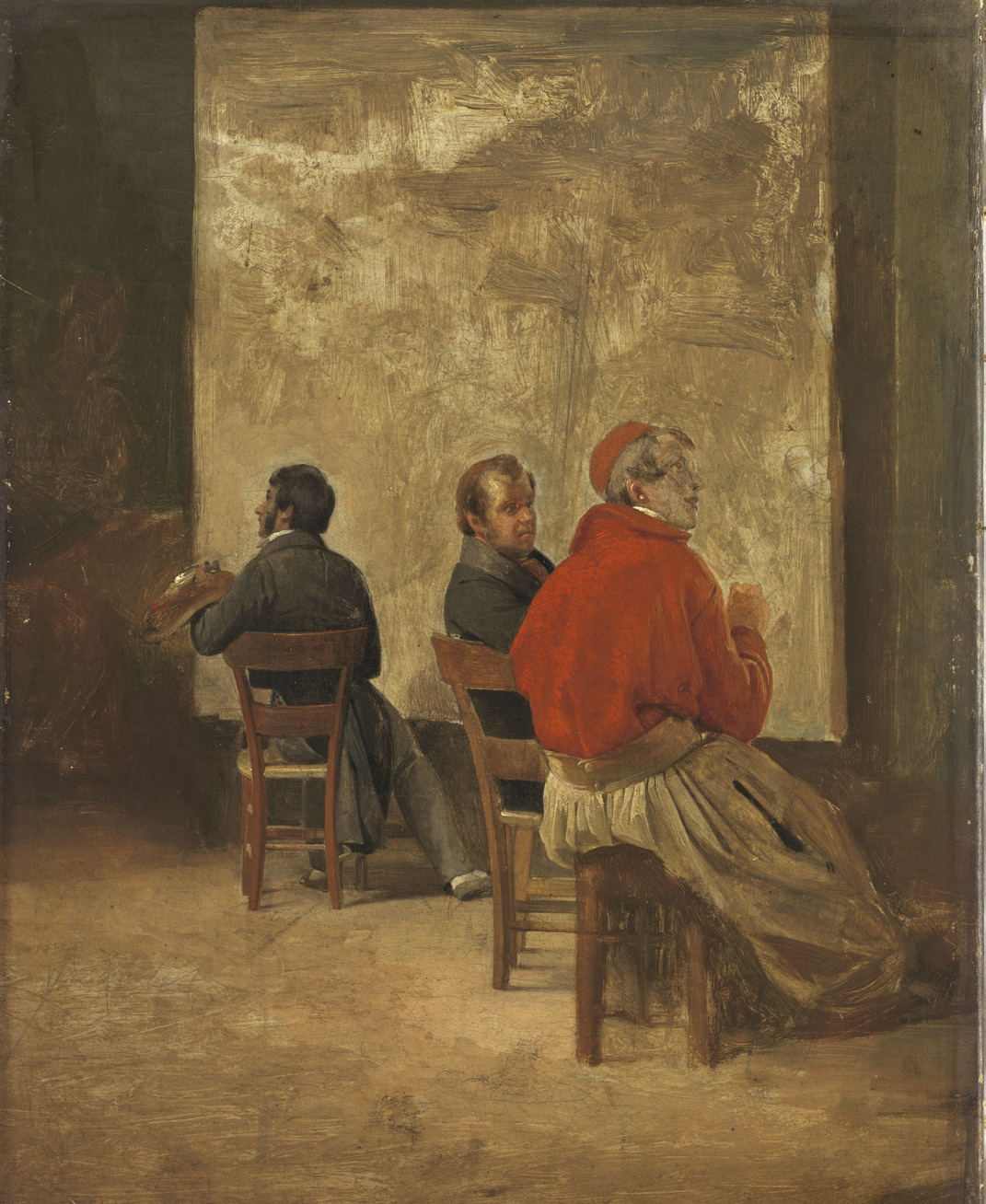
Attributed to Leprince, Intérieur d'atelier, c. 1826, Musée Magnin, Dijon.

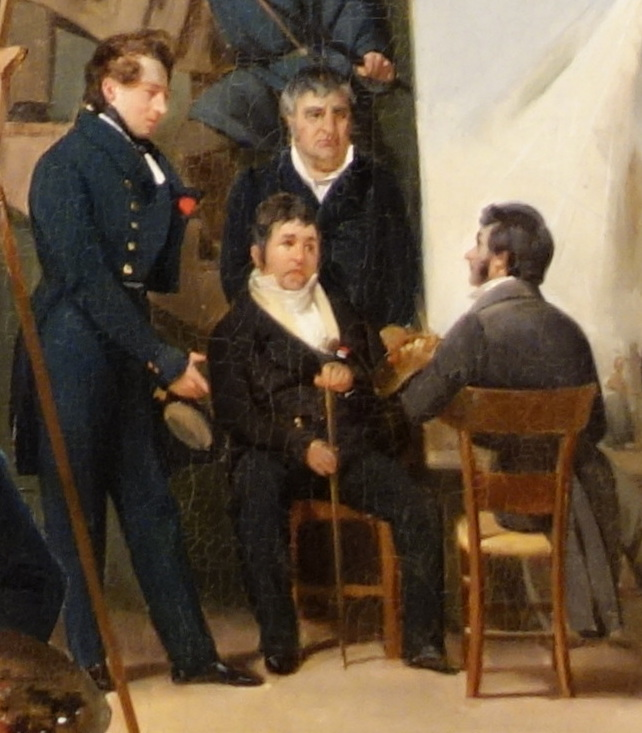
Detail from The Artist's Studio showing figures thought to be Leprince (right), his father, and his brothers Léopold (left) and Gustave.

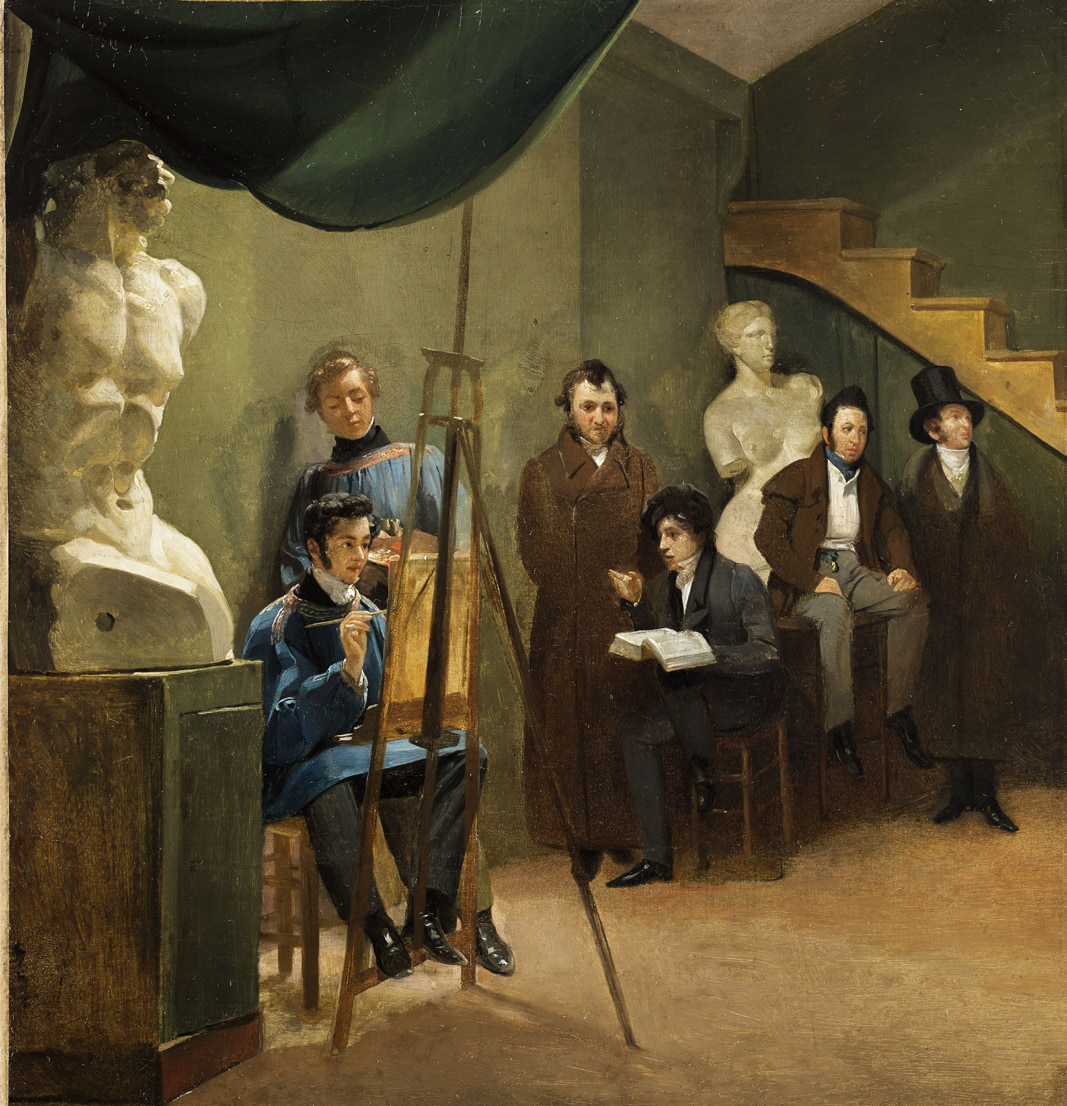
Attributed to Leprince, Le Peintre dans son atelier, c. 1826, Musée Magnin, Dijon.

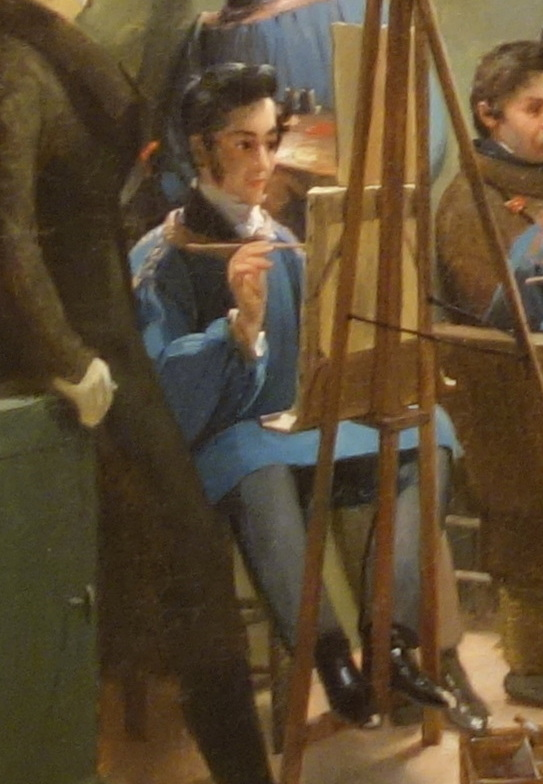
Detail from The Artist's Studio showing the figure thought to depict Eugène Lepoittevin.

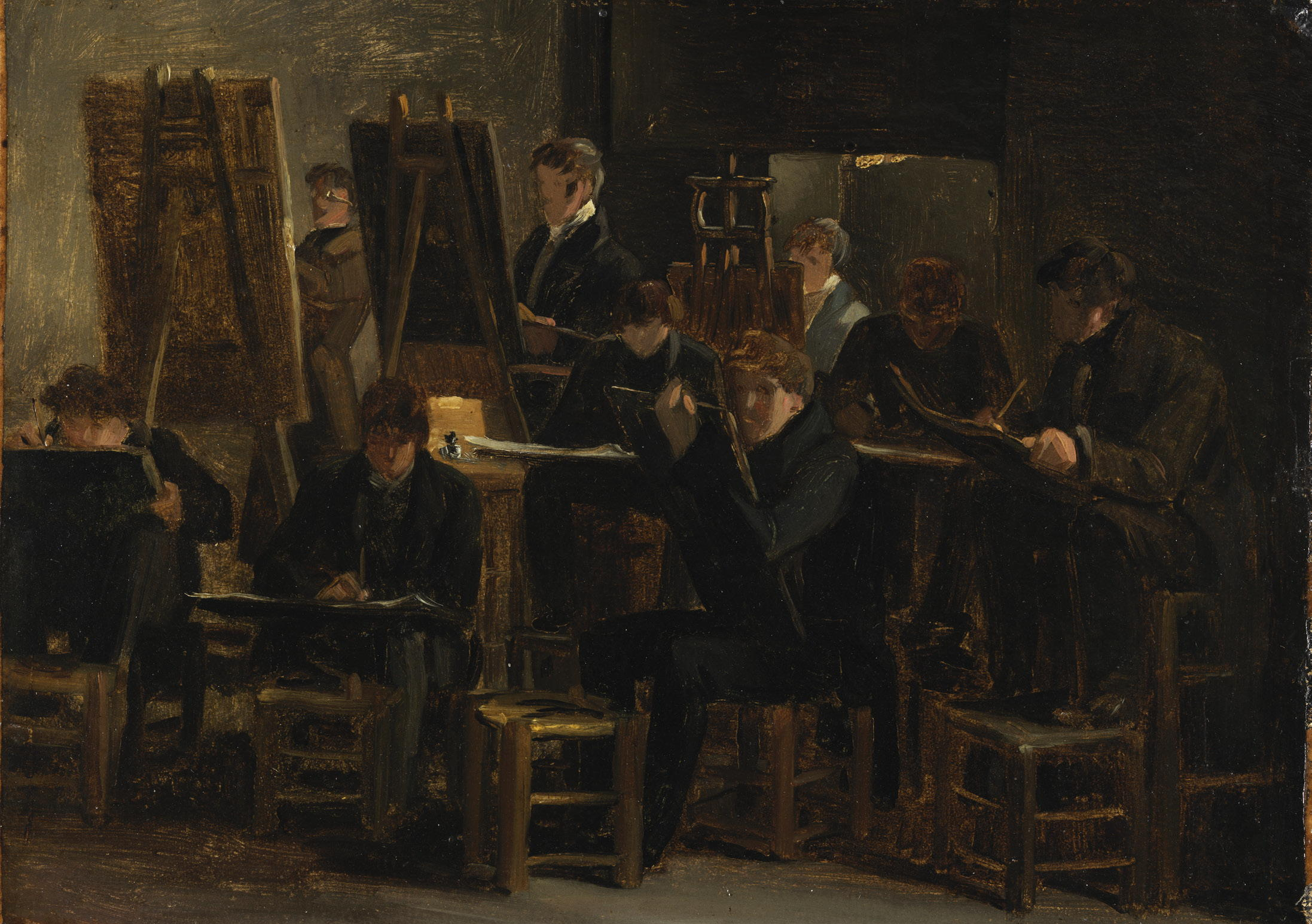
Studio Interior with Artists Working, 1820, Nationalmuseum, Stockholm.

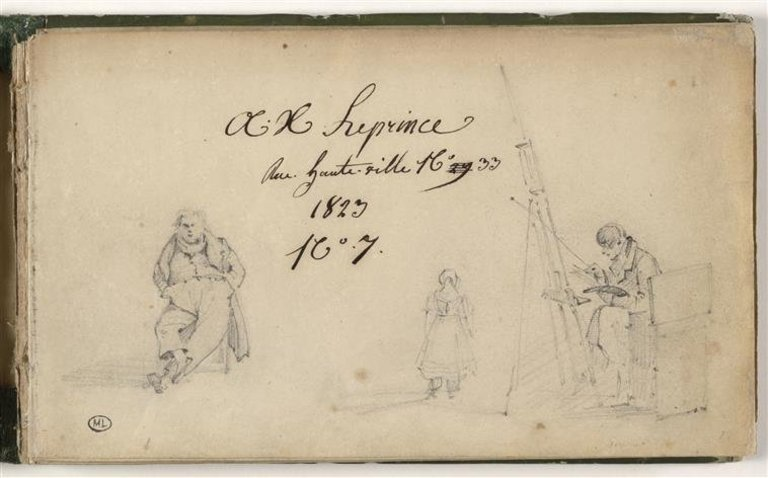
Note manuscrite; homme assis; femme; peintre à son chevalet, 1823, Louvre Museum.

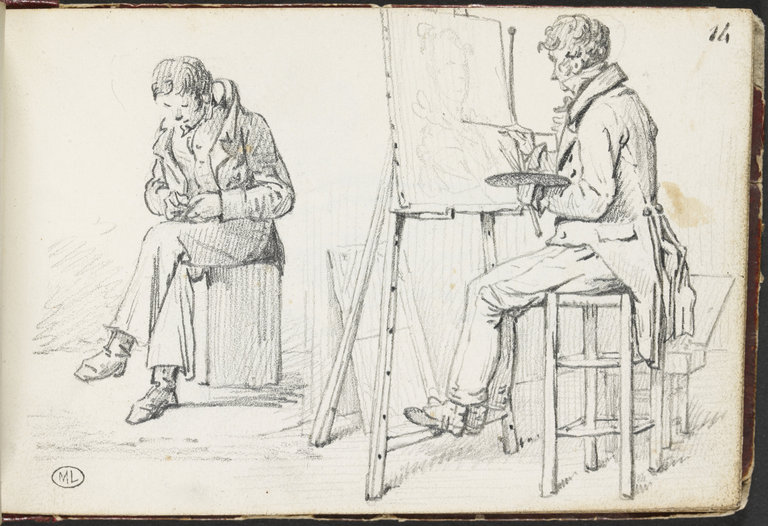
Un peintre et un jeune homme assis, Louvre Museum.

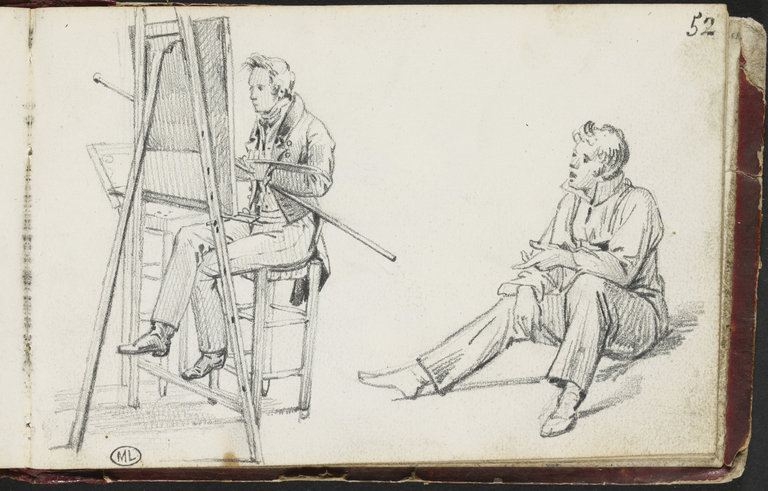
Un peintre et un jeune homme assis, Louvre Museum.

Leprince also depicted artists en plein air (outdoors), notably in Halte des peintres à Fontainebleau (Painters at Rest, Fontainebleau; c. 1824), which was included in the 2008 exhibition "In the Forest of Fontainebleau: Painters and Photographers from Corot to Monet" at the National Gallery. "It is quite common for artists to represent themselves at work. But the originality of Leprince's work is to show them discovering the splendor of the landscape of Fontainebleau. Leprince places the painters in the center of the foreground of the composition and draws them very small. They are thus the scale marker of this landscape which becomes, through this artifice, monumental in the eyes of the spectator."

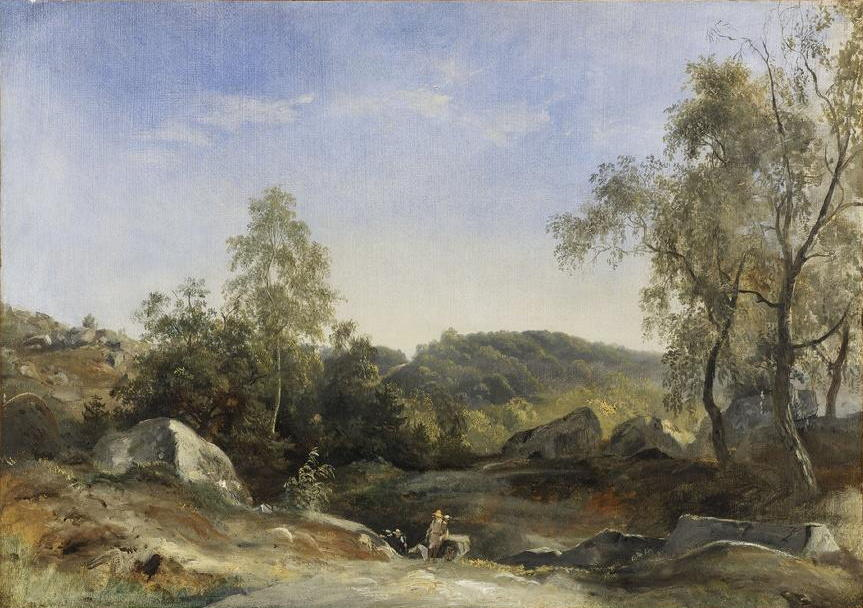
Halte des peintres à Fontainebleau, c. 1824, Musée départemental de l'Oise, Beauvais.

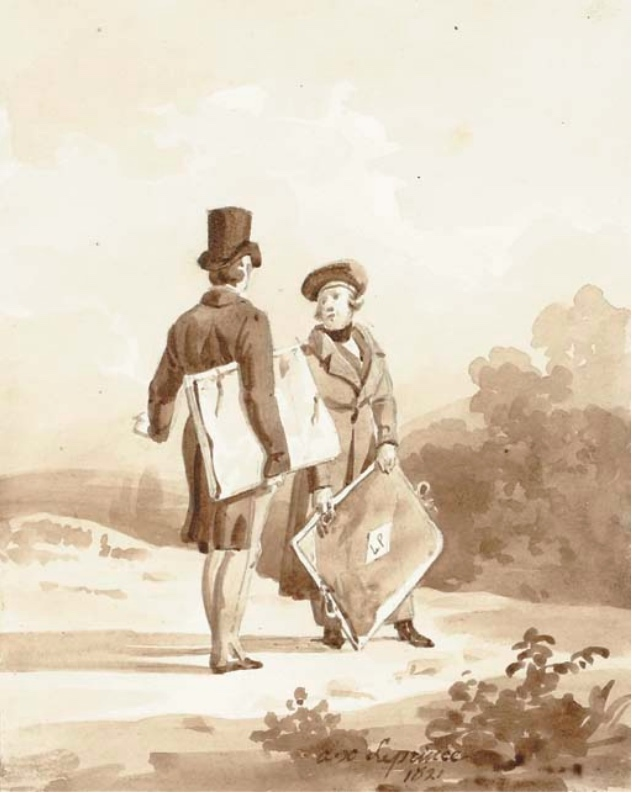
Deux artistes discutant dans un paysage, 1821, private collection.

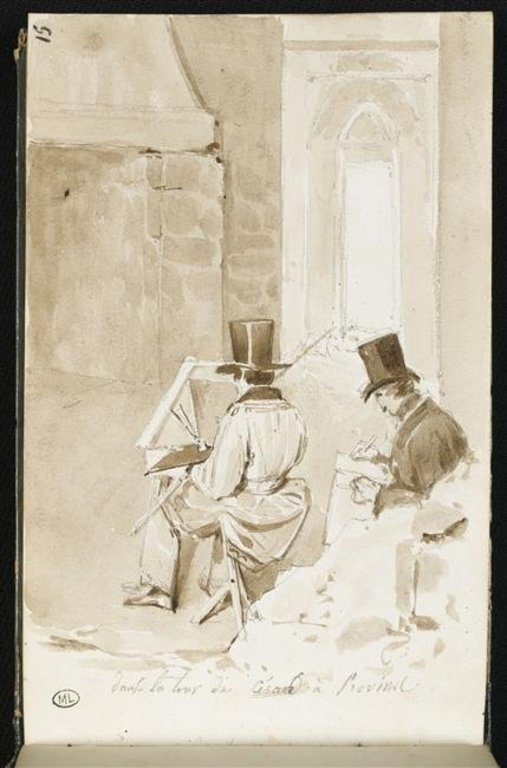
Deux peintres dessinant, dans la tour de César, à Provins, 1822, Louvre Museum.

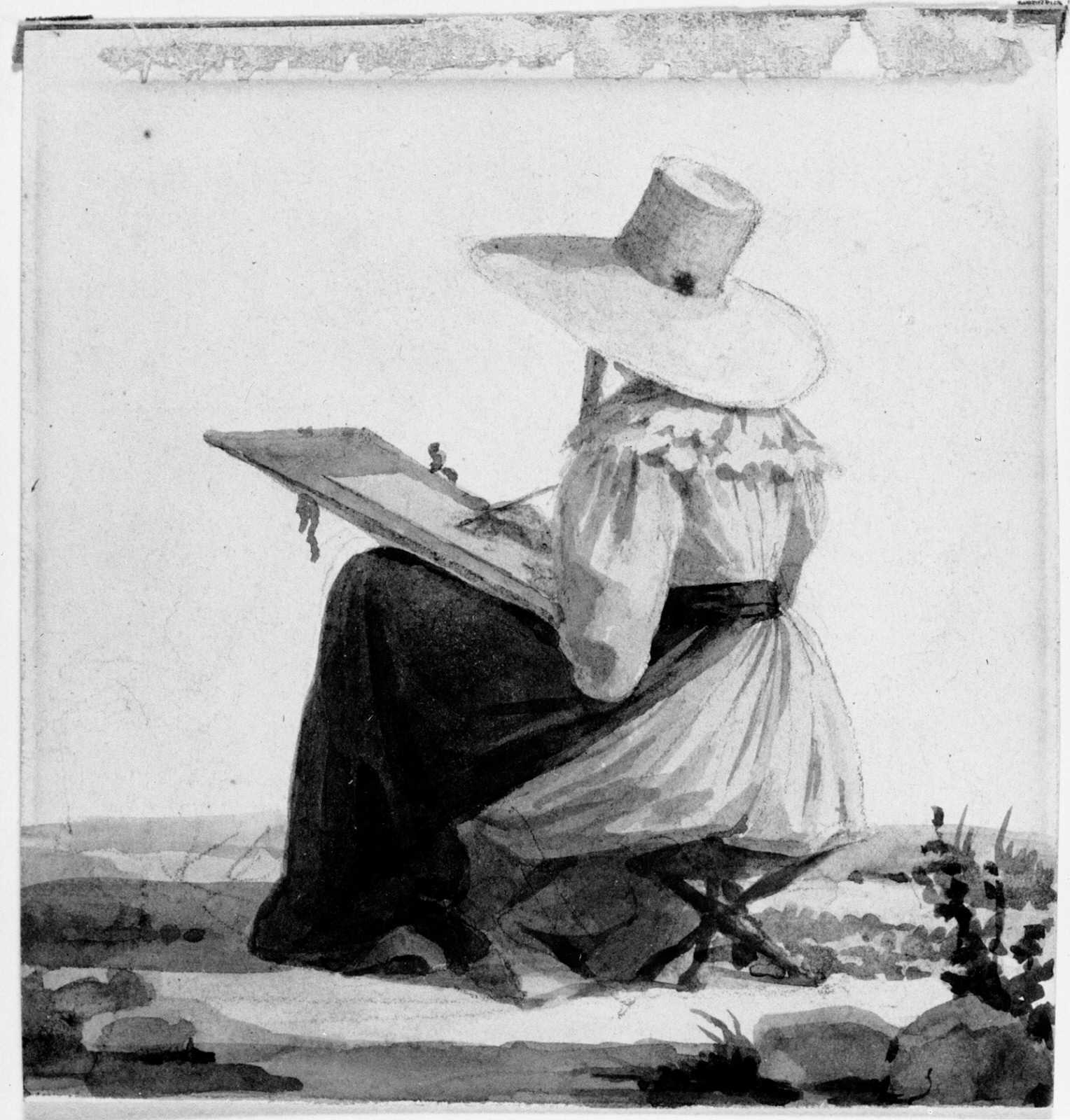
Woman sketching, watercolor, before 1827, Clark Art Institute.

== Illustrations and lithographs ==
For popular consumption, Leprince also created book illustrations and works for reproduction as lithographs. In the estate sale that followed his death, one lot was described as "fifty lithographed pieces, comprising the complete work of everything M. X. Leprince has executed in lithography."

Not too far from boyhood himself, he provided illustrations for Les Jeux des jeunes garçons (The Games of Young Boys), published in 1822. The book was a popular success (the entry at worldcat.org notes a fifth edition), and was followed a year later by the fanciful Jeux des jeunes filles de tous les pays (Games of Young Girls of All Countries).

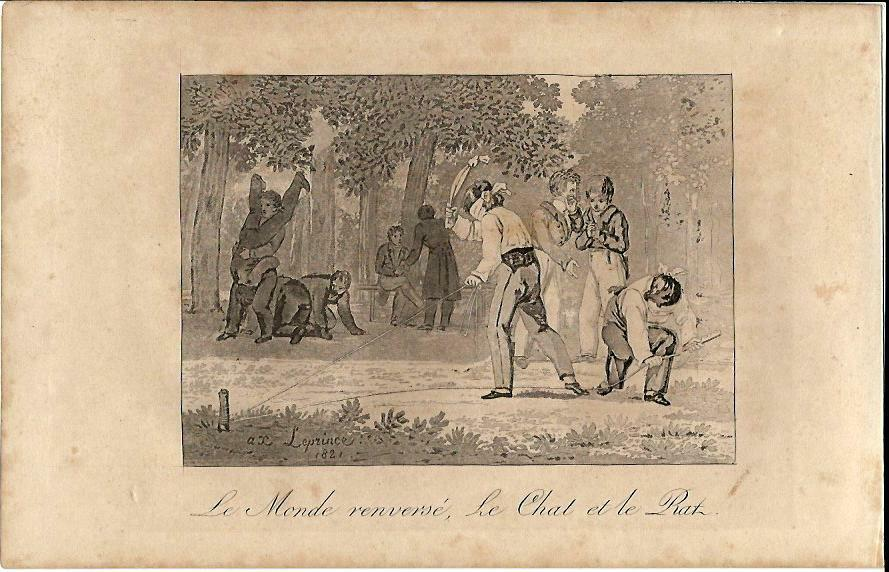
Le Monde renversè, Le Chat et le Rat, 1821; from the book Les Jeux des jeunes garçons, 1822.

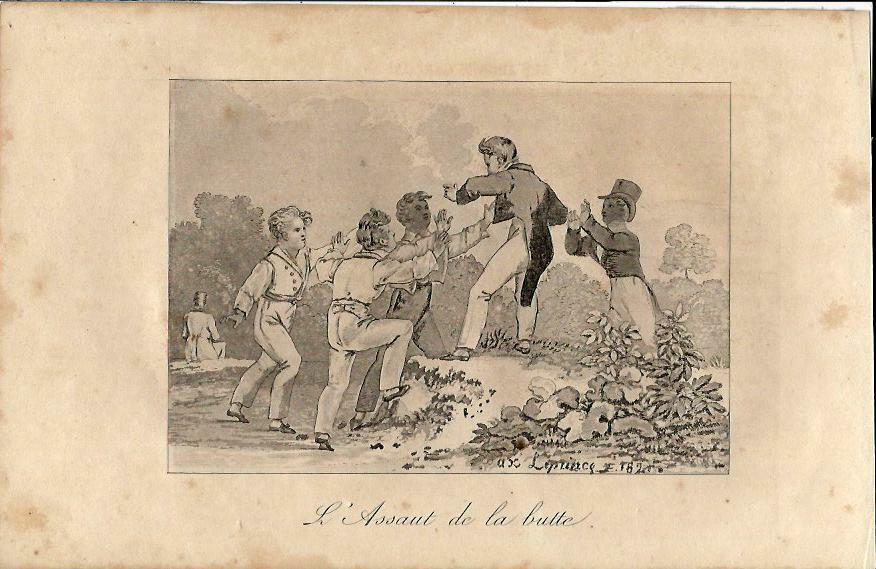
L' Assaut de la butte, 1821; from the book Les Jeux des jeunes garçons, 1822.

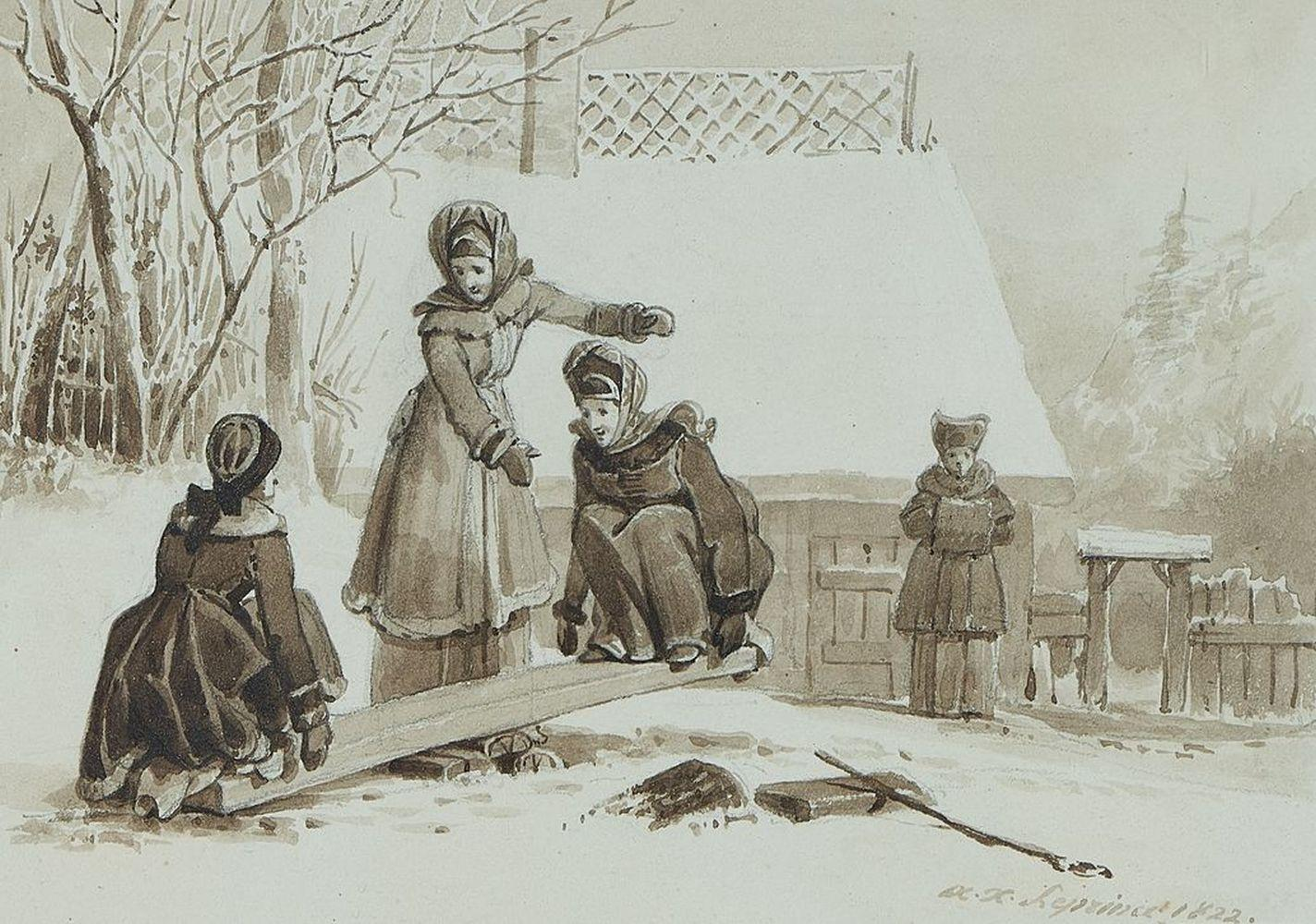
La Bascule Russe, 1822; reproduced in the book Jeux des jeunes filles de tous les pays, 1823

In 1819, Leprince created a series of at least three small paintings depicting travel by stagecoach (in French, diligence). A touch of ribaldry at once realistic and fanciful can be seen in Le depart de la Diligence; off to one side, a male passenger renders the artist's signature and the date by urinating against a wall. This link between stagecoach travel and a certain raucous sense of humor was given free rein in Leprince's Inconvéniens d'un Voyage en Diligence, an album of hand-colored satirical lithographs depicting the perils and humiliations of travel by stagecoach, published in 1826. The "suite of twelve highly amusing plates" are to be found today only as "an extremely rare color-plate book. Plate No. 5 presents an amusing, if cautionary, piece de l'emesis vue de la nausée as a coach speeds along, causing the damsel riding atop it to hurl her cookies, which carom off a passenger's head and into a roadside beggar's chapeau."

The series won high praise. Jacques Arago wrote, "Shall we not put, next to our most caustic creators, Henry Monnier and Xavier Leprince, to whom caricature owes its most biting productions?"

"Everyone knows the charming lithographs where Mr. Xavier Leprince captured…all the disagreeableness reserved for poor travelers taking the stagecoach," begins a review of a play based on the lithographs. The comedy Inconvéniens d'un Voyage en Diligence premiered at the Théâtre des Variétés in Paris on Saturday, 11 November 1826, six weeks before Leprince's death.

The Musée Carnavalet in Paris and the British Museum in London both hold incomplete sets of Inconvéniens, but between the two, all the images can be seen.

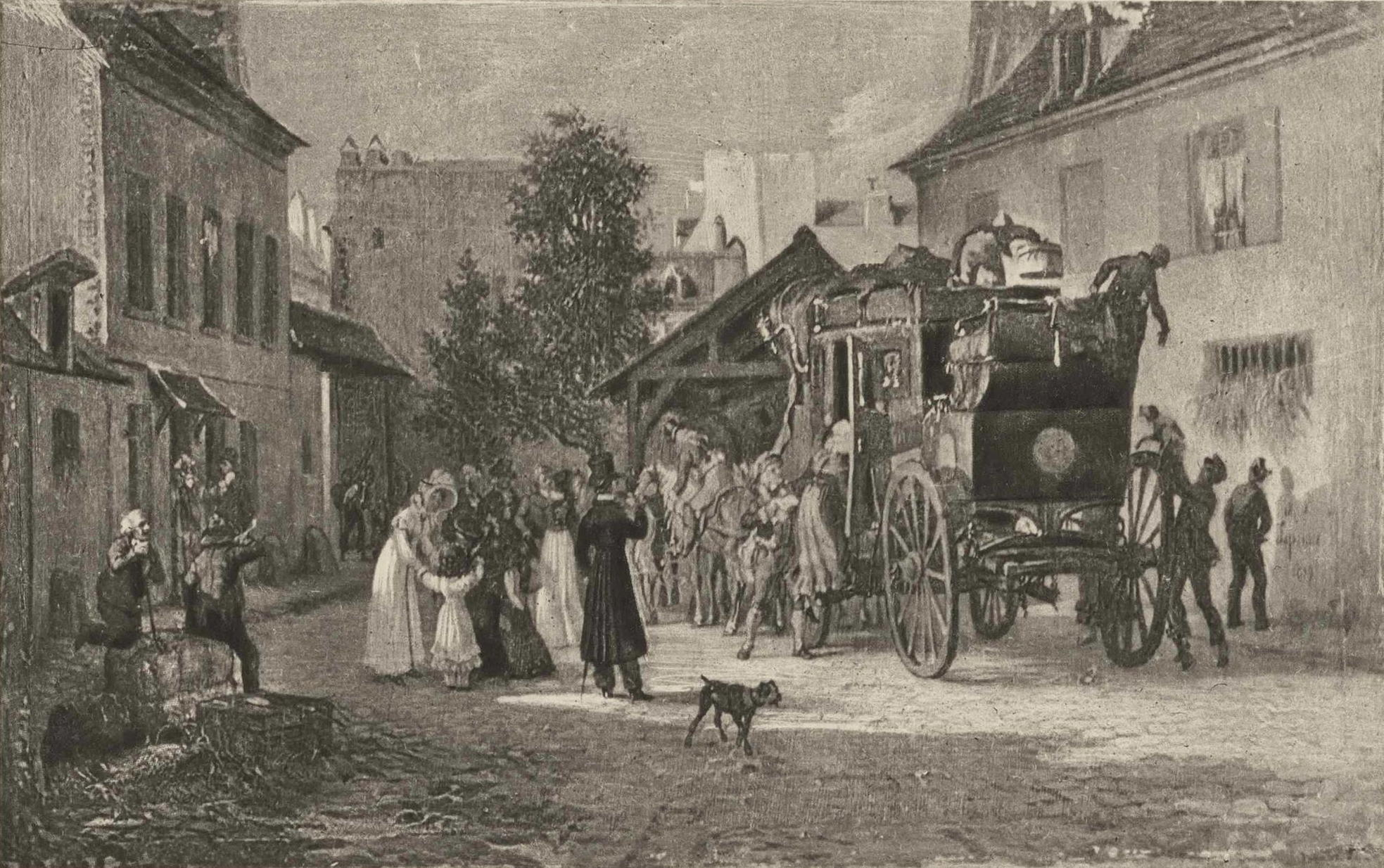
Le depart de la Diligence, 1819.

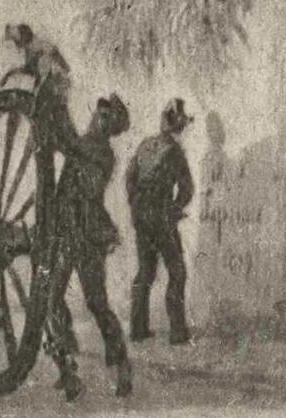
Detail from Le depart de la Diligence, 1819.

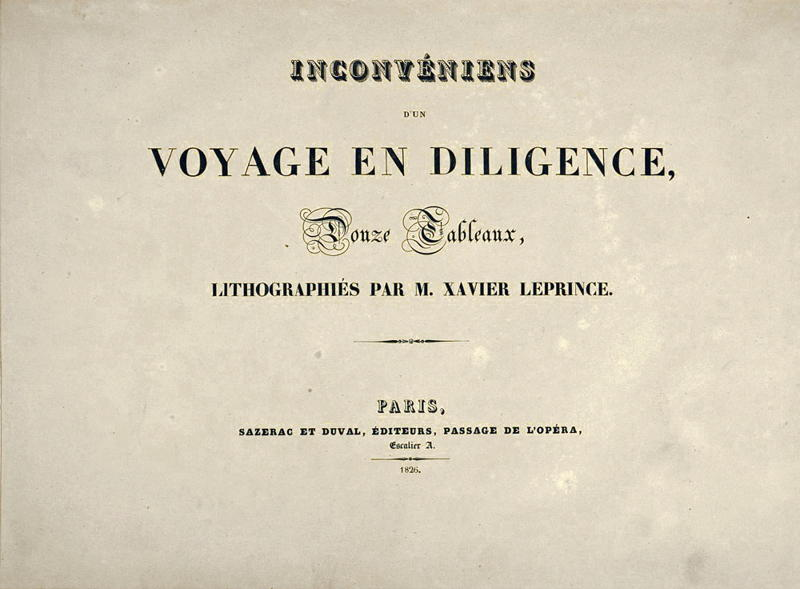
Inconvéniens d'un voyage en diligence, title page, 1826, private collection.

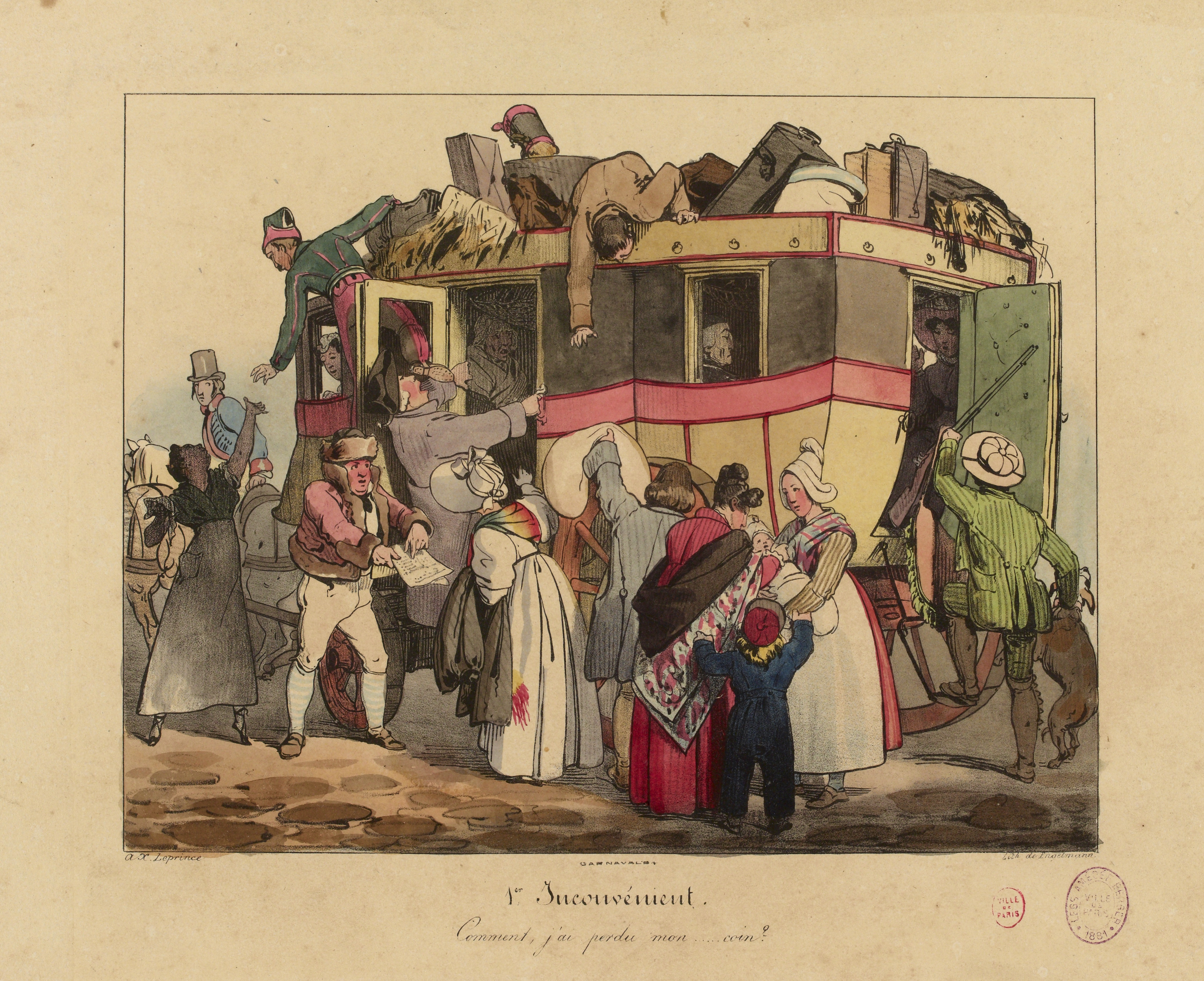
Inconvéniens d'un voyage en diligence, plate 1, 1826, Musée Carnavalet.

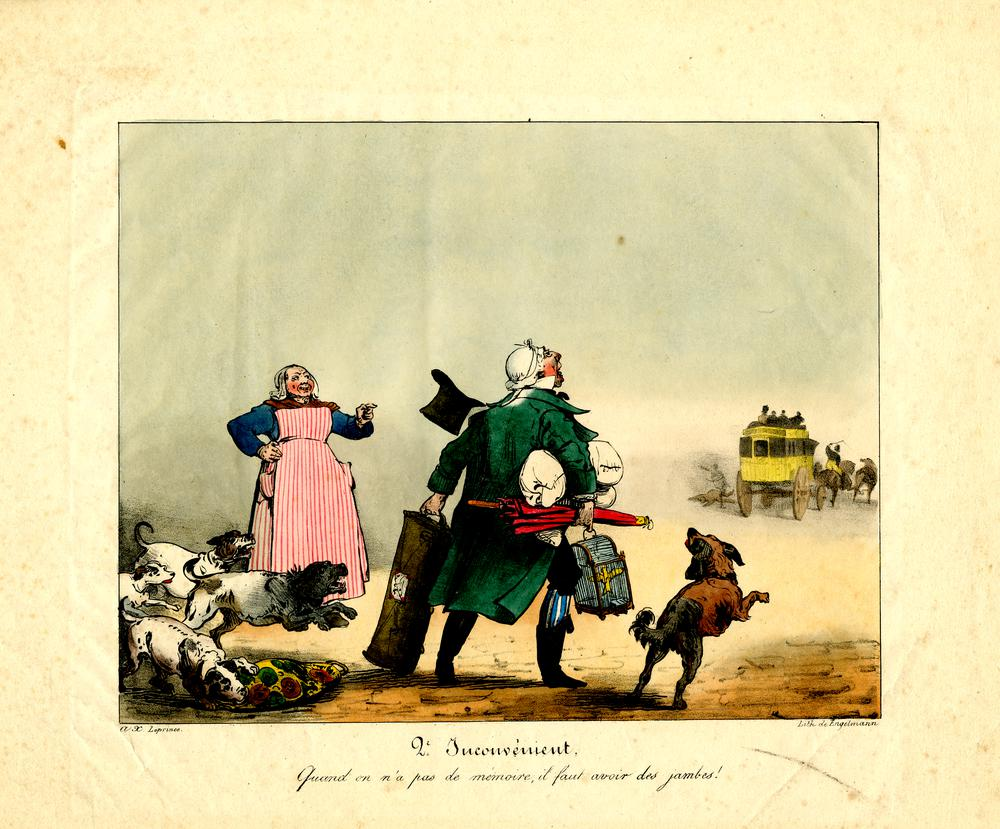
Inconvéniens d'un voyage en diligence, plate 2, 1826, British Museum.

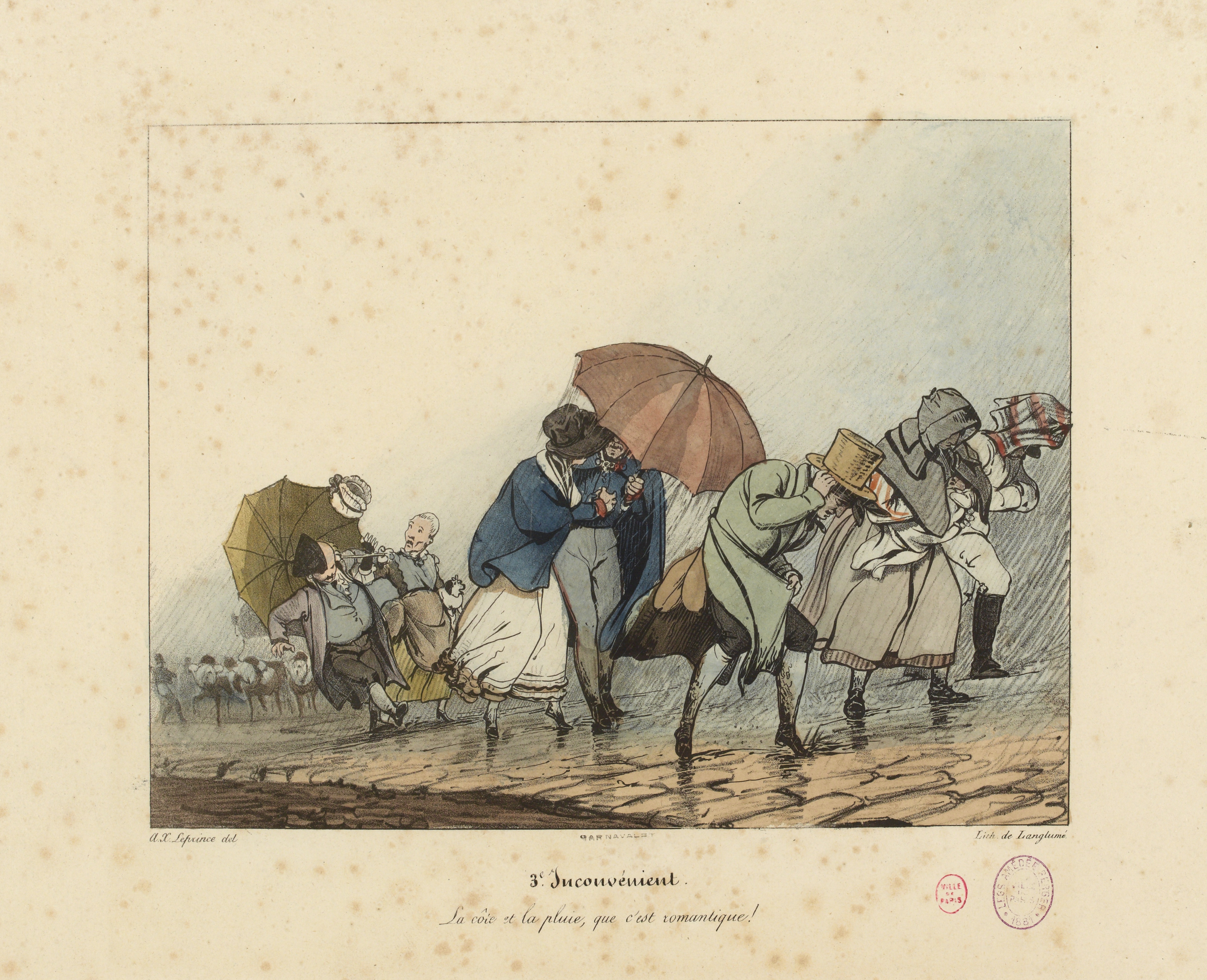
Inconvéniens d'un voyage en diligence, plate 3, 1826, Musée Carnavalet.

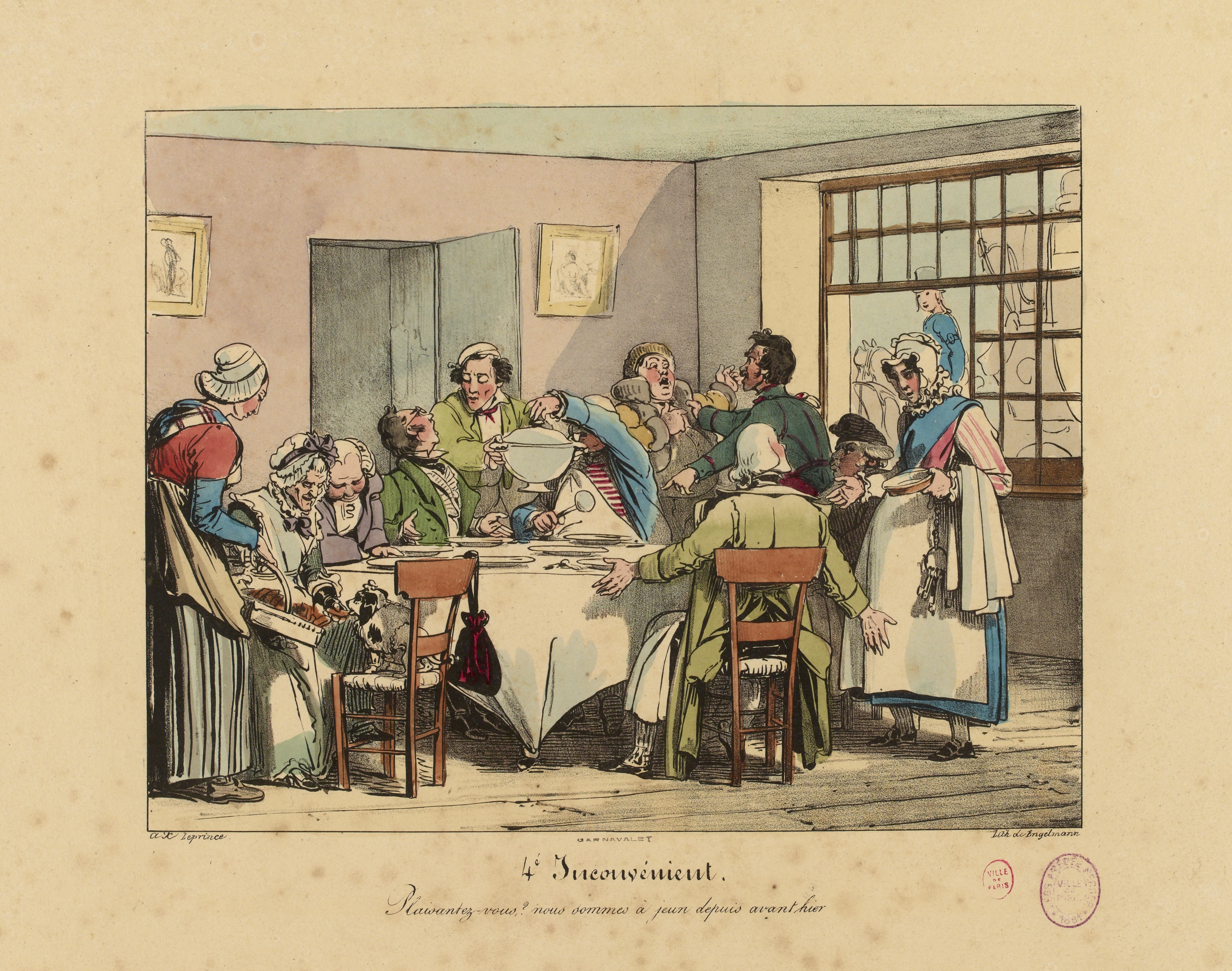
Inconvéniens d'un voyage en diligence, plate 4, 1826, Musée Carnavalet.

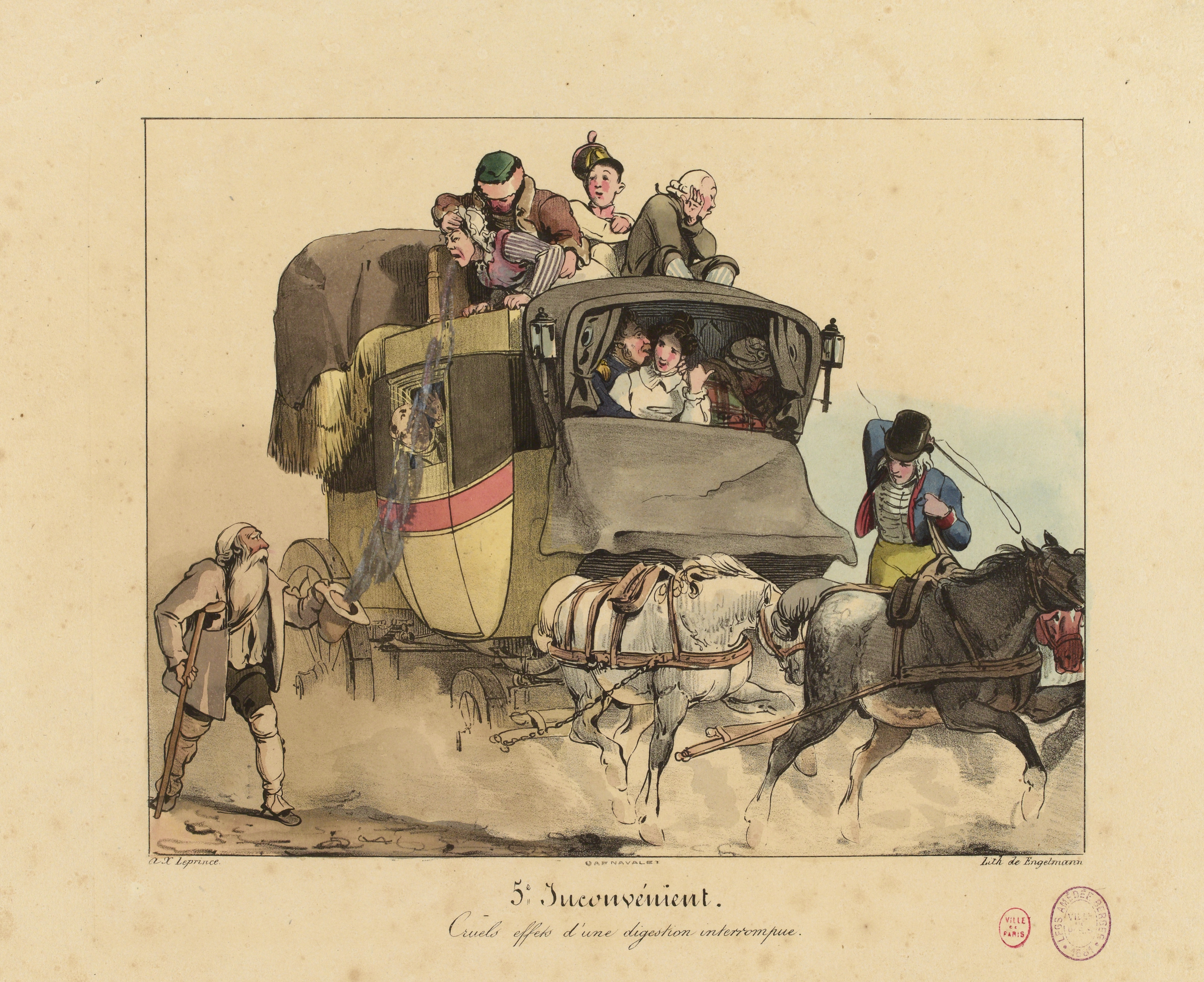
Inconvéniens d'un voyage en diligence, plate 5, 1826, Musée Carnavalet.

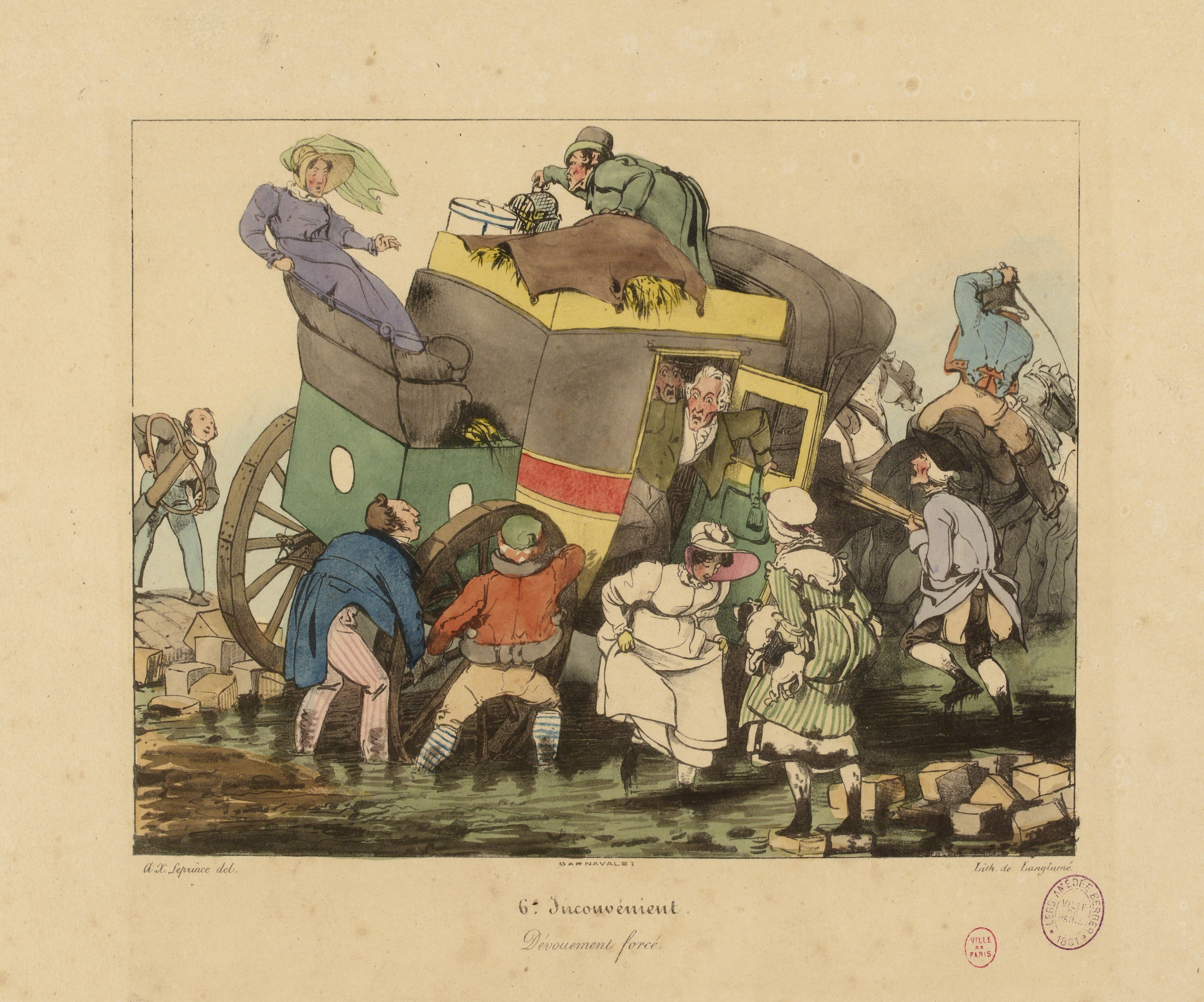
Inconvéniens d'un voyage en diligence, plate 6, 1826, Musée Carnavalet.

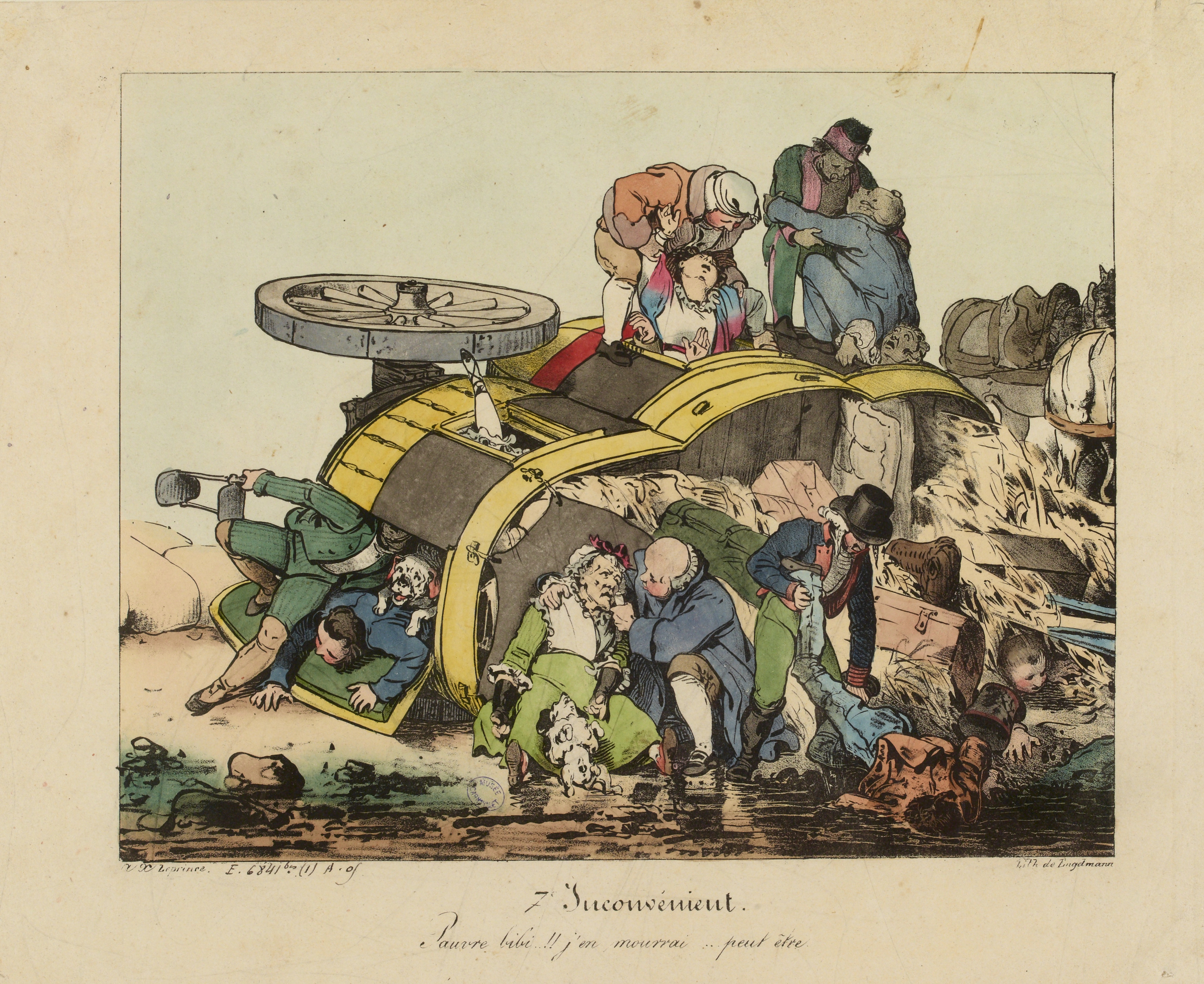
Inconvéniens d'un voyage en diligence, plate 7, 1826, Musée Carnavalet.

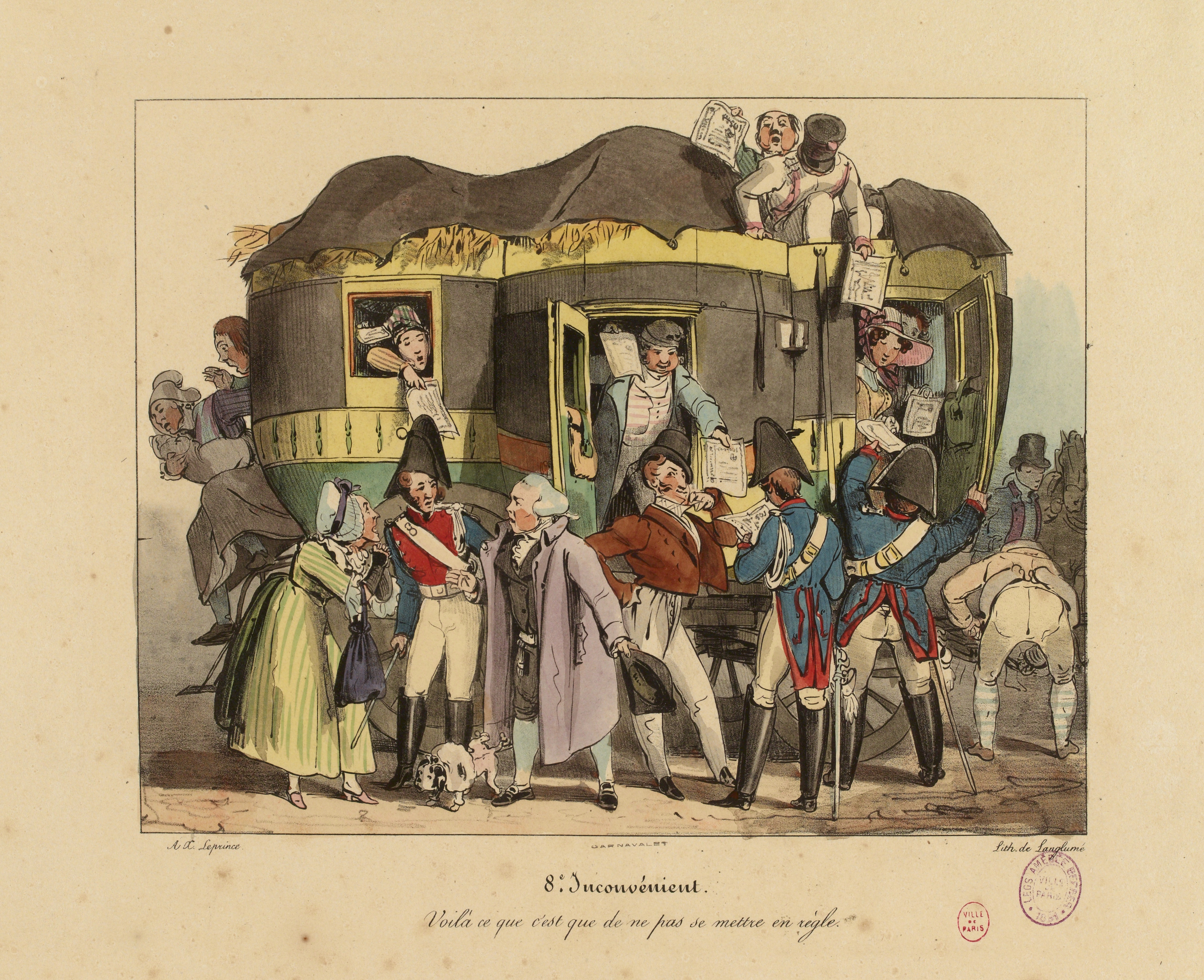
Inconvéniens d'un voyage en diligence, plate 8, 1826, Musée Carnavalet.

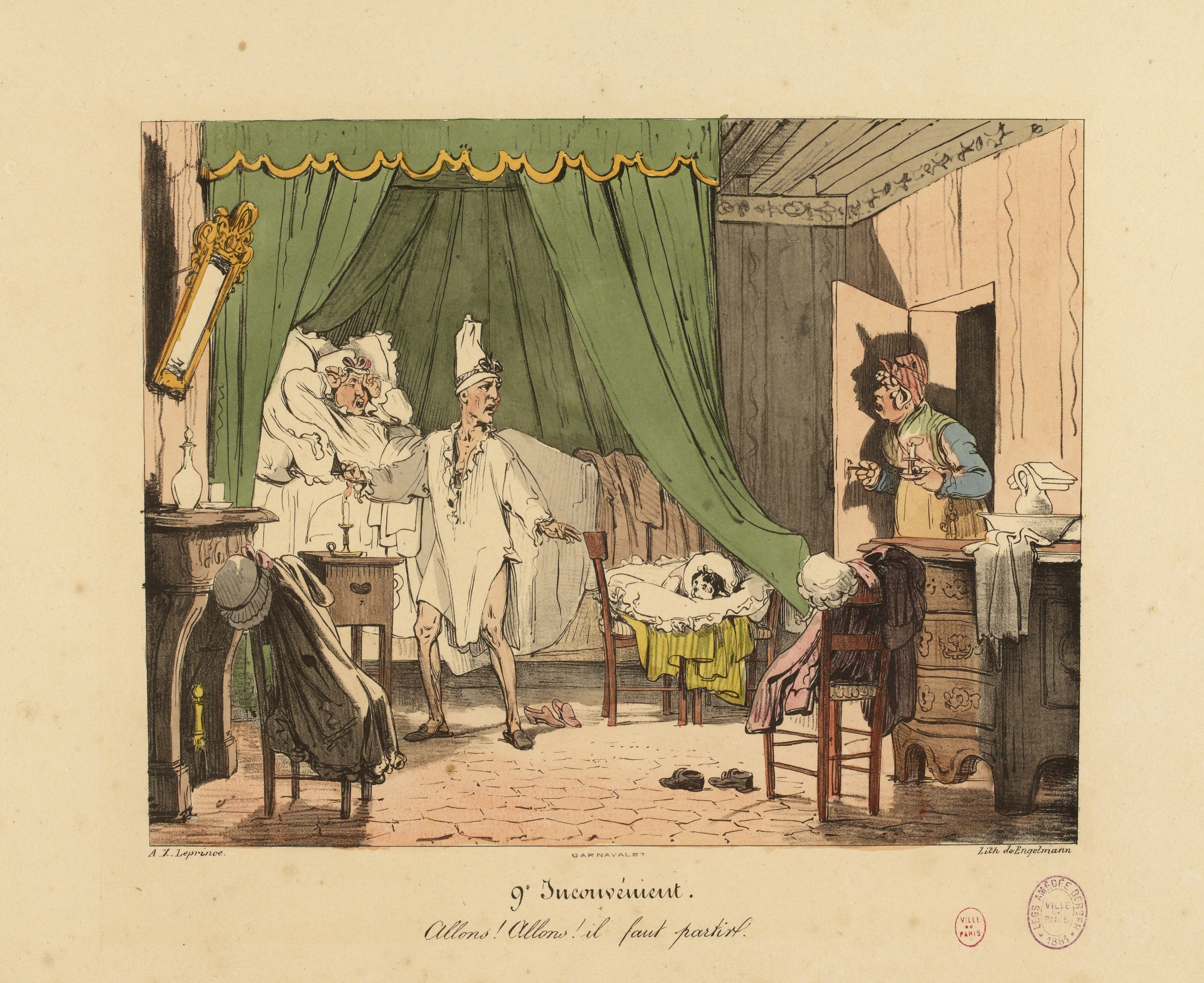
Inconvéniens d'un voyage en diligence, plate 9, 1826, Musée Carnavalet.

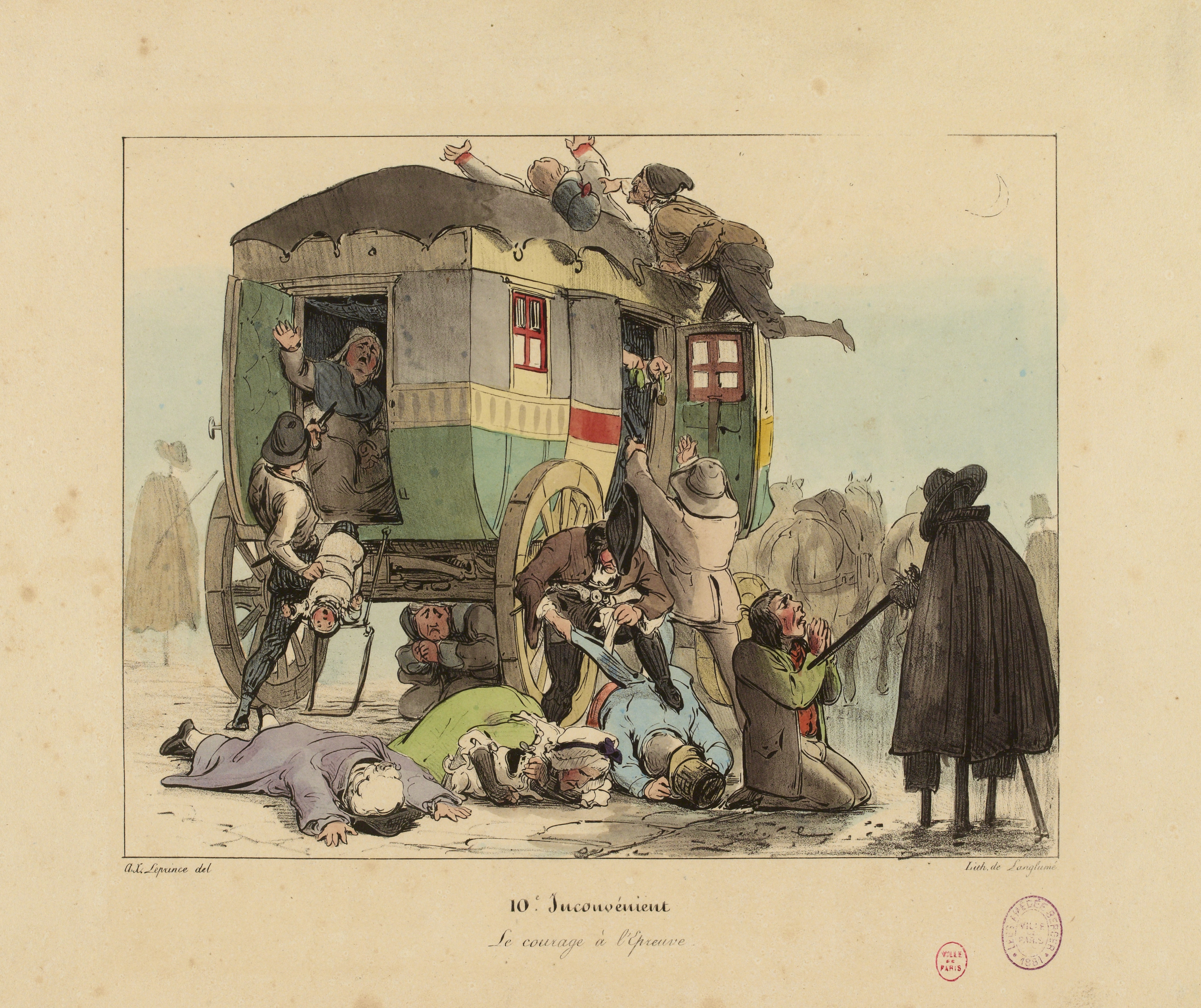
Inconvéniens d'un voyage en diligence, plate 10, 1826, Musée Carnavalet.

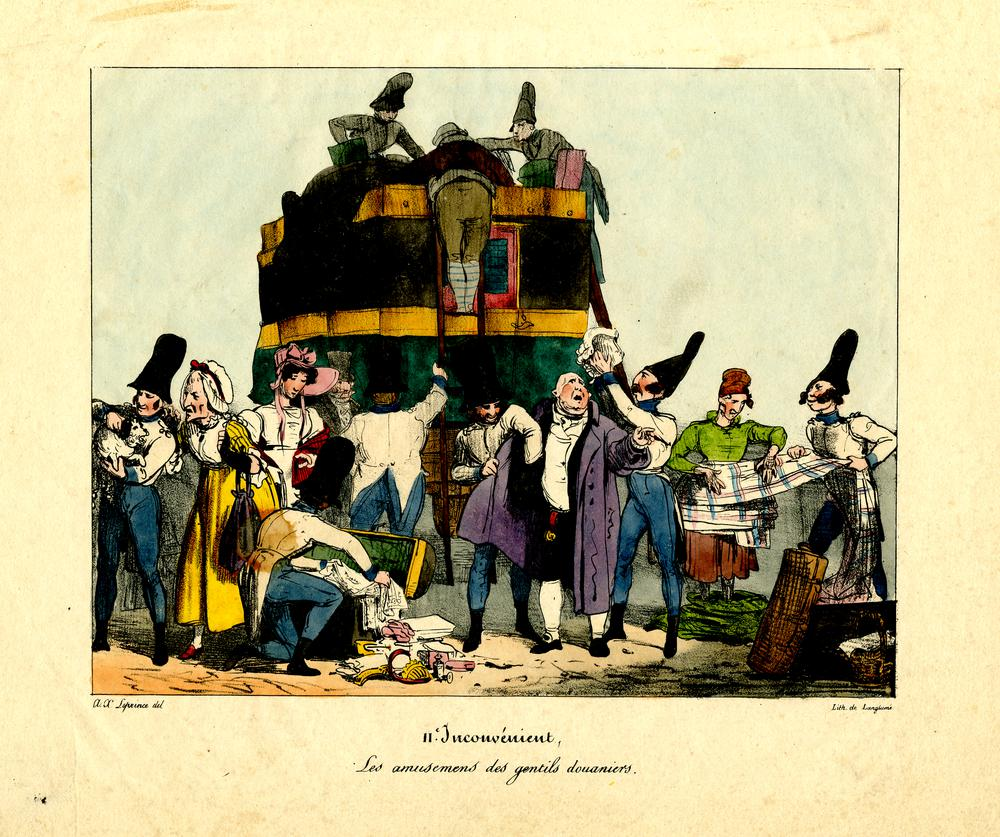
Inconvéniens d'un voyage en diligence, plate 11, 1826, British Museum.

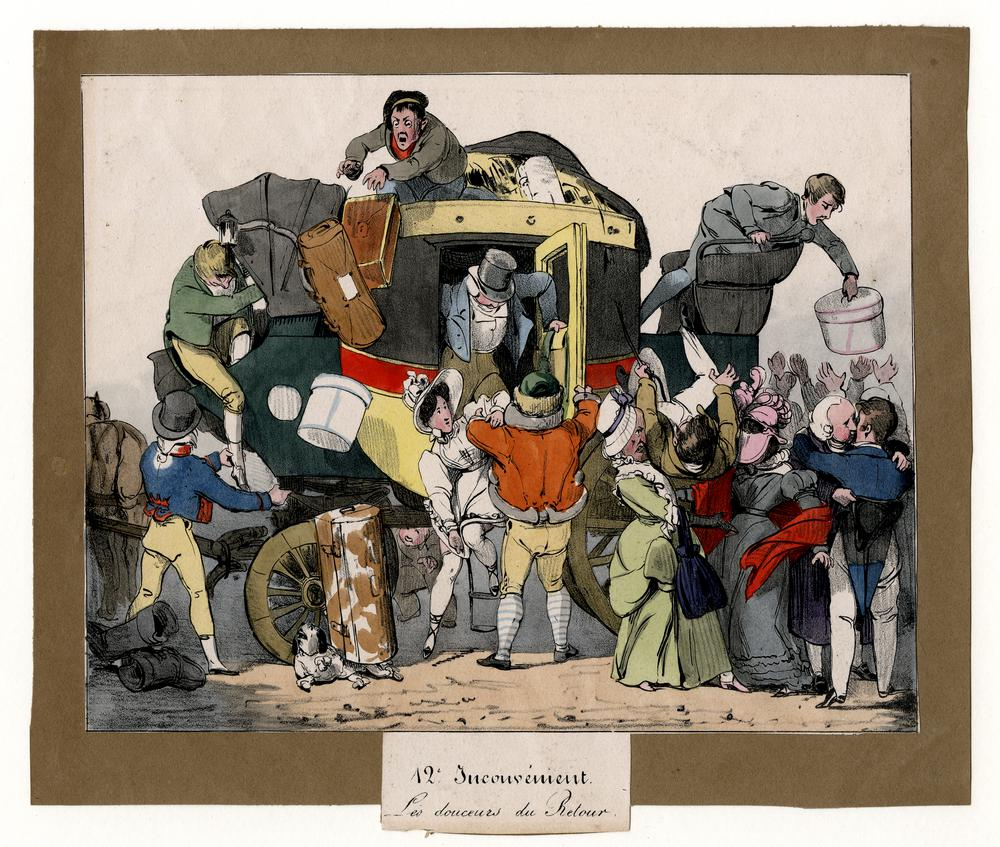
Inconvéniens d'un voyage en diligence, plate 12, 1826, British Museum.

Since at least the 1920s, another album of hand-colored lithographs has been attributed to Leprince. Métamorphoses d'Arlequin, Parades: Jouées sur le Théâtre Français, a set of twelve images published in Brussels in 1826, is "a fascinating and intriguing album that appears to be a political allegory with the theater as backdrop and Harlequin as character in the political events in France 1791-1826. The fact that the album was published, without publisher or artist attribution, in Belgium rather than France strongly suggests fear of running afoul of French press censorship laws of the era." Authorship has also been attributed to Henri-Gérard Fontallard, "but that cannot be so," according to rare book dealer David Brass. "Close comparison with caricatures signed by Leprince and Fontallard conclusively demonstrate[s] that the style here is dramatically different than Fontallard's but extremely close to Leprince's, particularly in the faces of the figures depicted." The Metropolitan Museum, which acquired a copy in 1966, lists attribution to J.J. Grandville. Métamorphoses d'Arlequin awaits the attention of scholars who may determine its authorship and elucidate its satirical nuances.

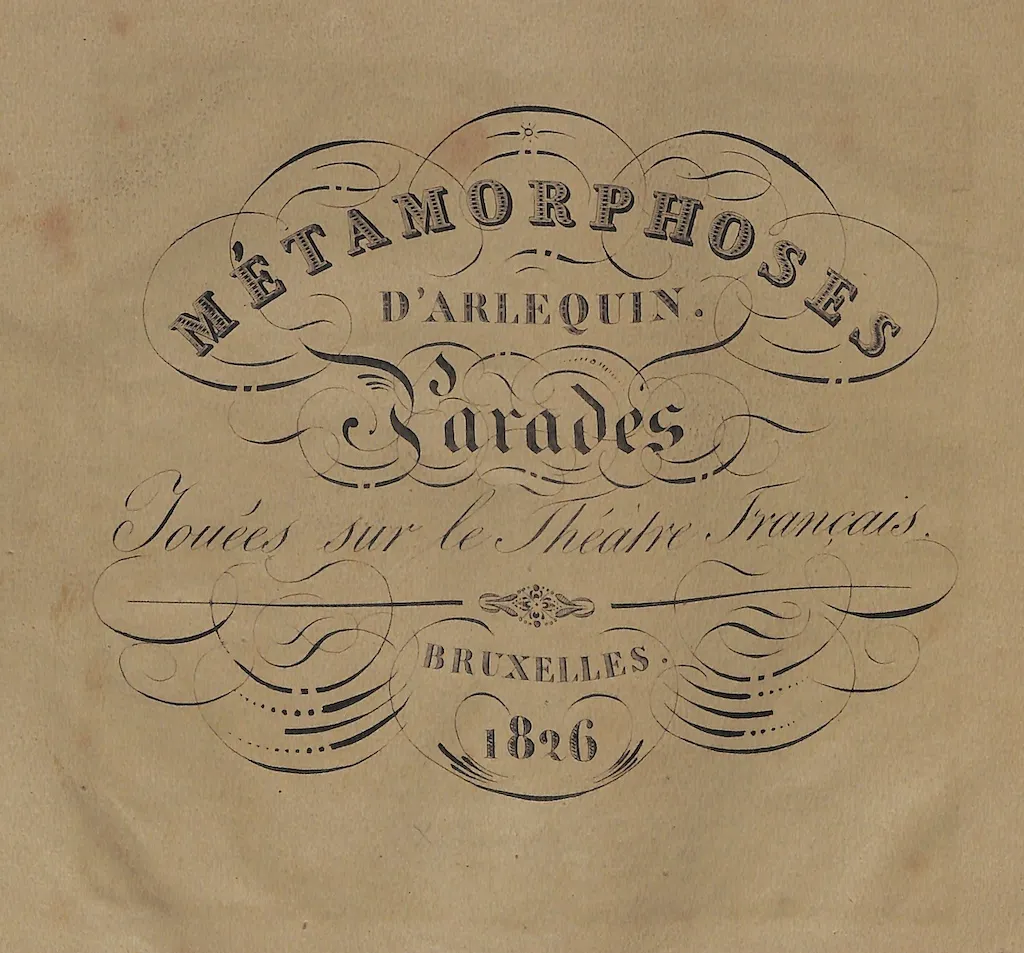
Title page, Métamorphoses d'Arlequin, 1826.

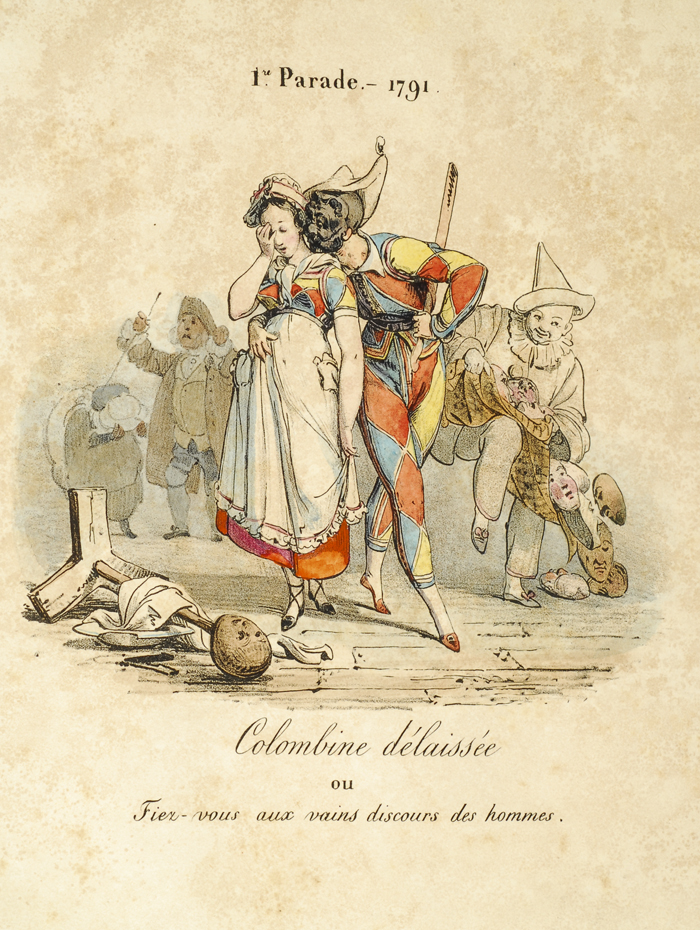
Image 1, Métamorphoses d'Arlequin, 1826.

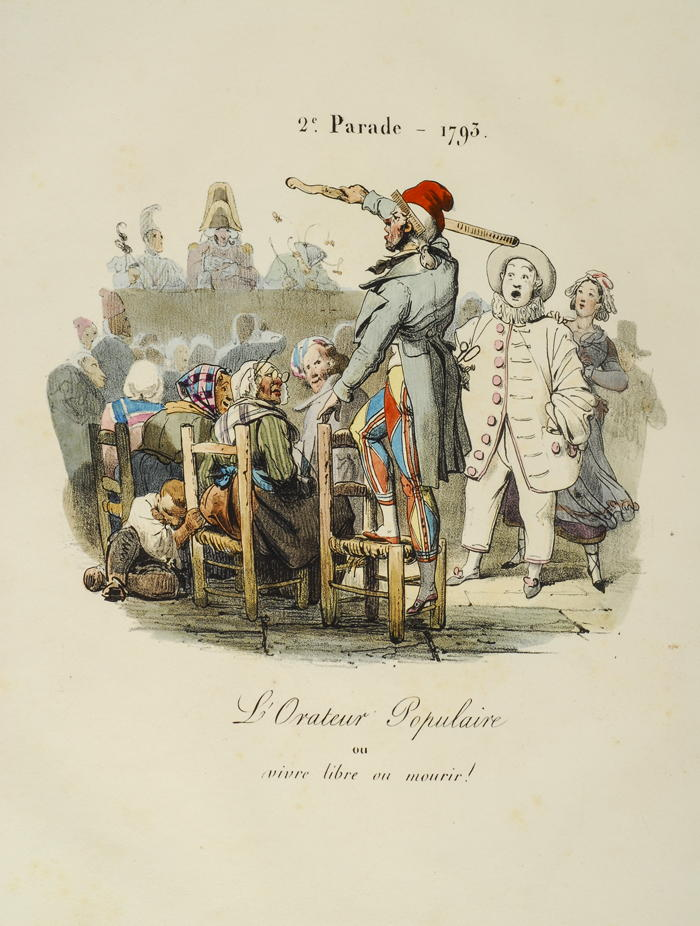
Image 2, Métamorphoses d'Arlequin, 1826.

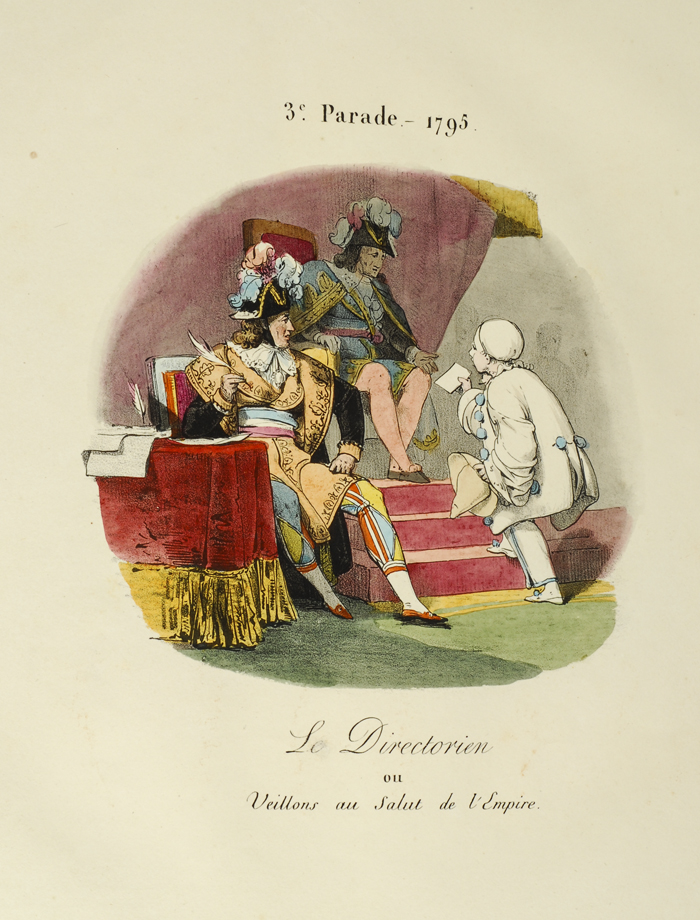
Image 3, Métamorphoses d'Arlequin, 1826.

== Portraits and self-portraits ==
A portrait of Leprince by Victor-René Garson was shown in the Paris Salon of 1822. A miniature portrait of Leprince by Frédéric Millet was shown at the Paris Salon of 1824, and in 1896 at an exposition at the Bishop's Palace in Chartres. The location of these works is unknown.

A black and white photograph of a self-portrait by Leprince is in the Frick Digital Collections; the location and date of the original painting are unknown. Du Sommerard speaks of Paysage de Susten en Suisse (1824, now in the Louvre) as a self-portrait, saying Leprince "pictured himself, from memory, with his pupils, braving the harshness of the frost to study nature in all its effects"; if Leprince is the seated figure with a sketchbook, his head is down and his face is not visible. Similarly, in his self-portrait in The Artist's Studio, Leprince's face is turned away from the viewer.

Leprince painted and drew family members (including portraits of his father and his brother Gustave dated 1824, at the Musée des Beaux-Arts de Chartres), and also celebrities, including an early portrait of Franz Liszt.

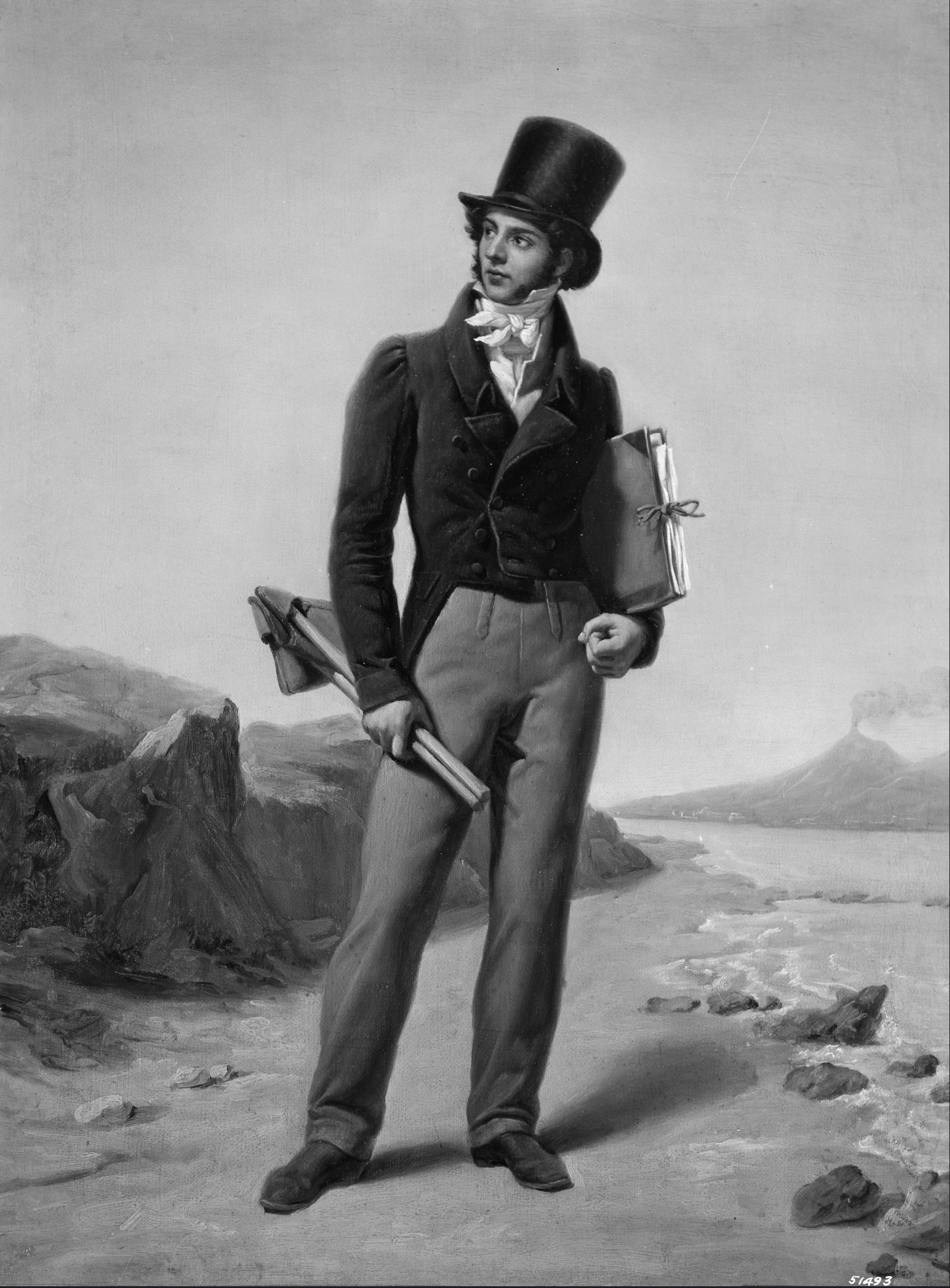
Le jeune artiste (self-portrait).

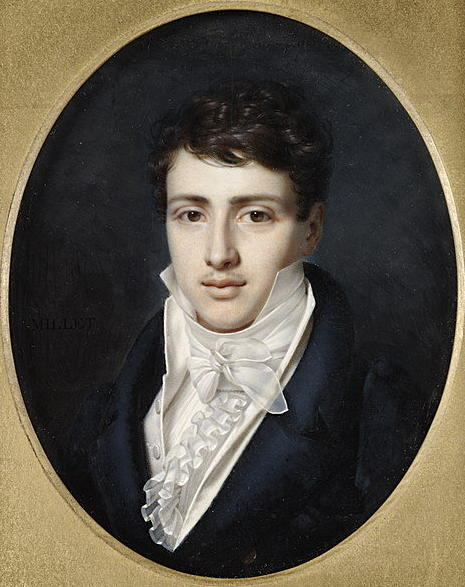
Frédéric Millet, miniature portrait on ivory (possibly Leprince), Louvre Museum.

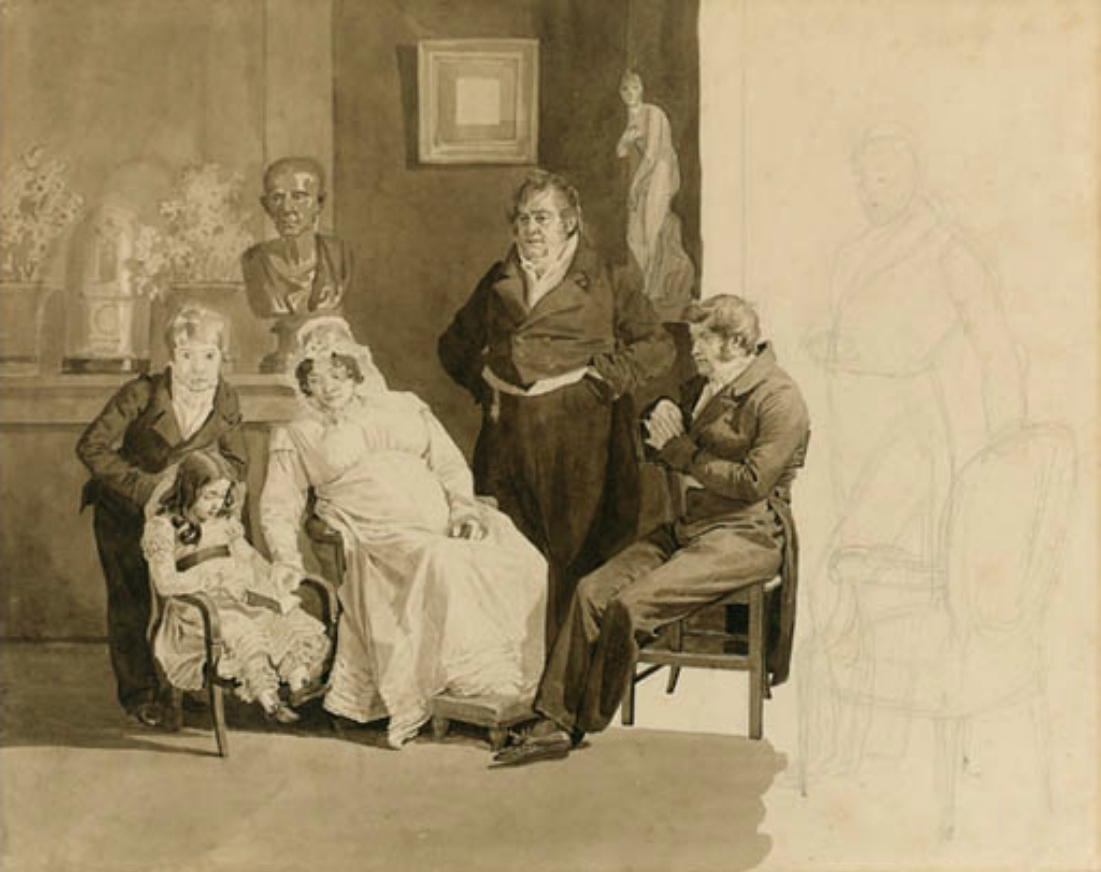
The artist's family in an interior, 1820 or 1821, private collection.

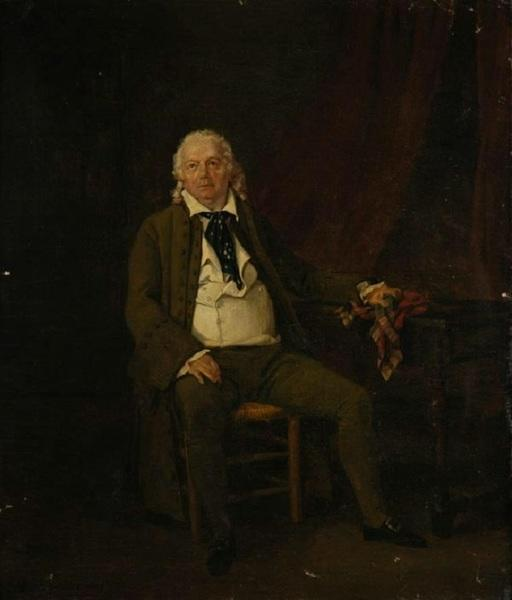
Simon Chenard in the play "Félix ou l'Enfant trouvé," 1821, Musée d'art et d'histoire Saint-Germain, Auxerre.

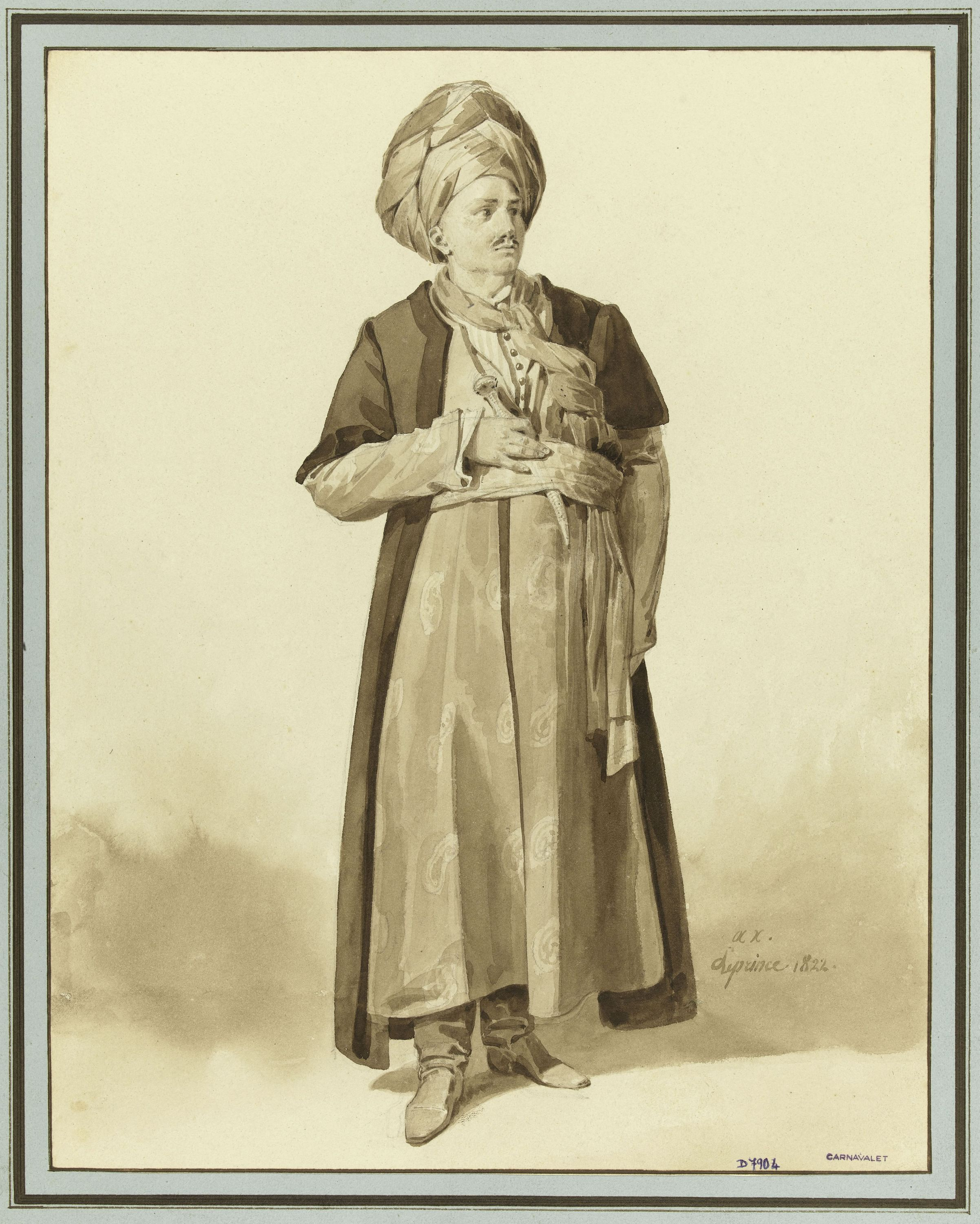
Simon Chénard in the play "Zémire et Azor," 1822, Musée Carnavalet.

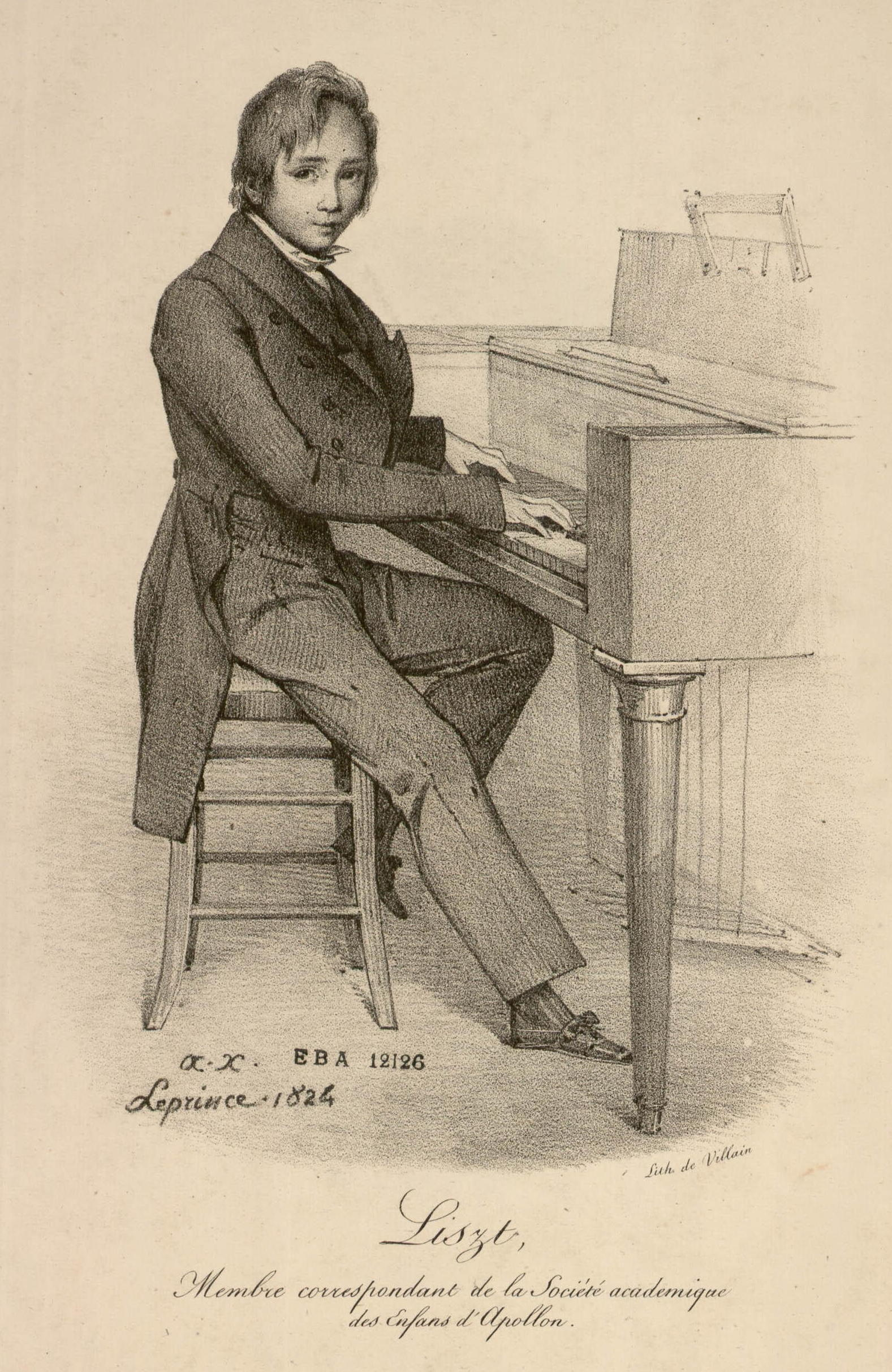
Portrait of Franz Liszt, 1824.

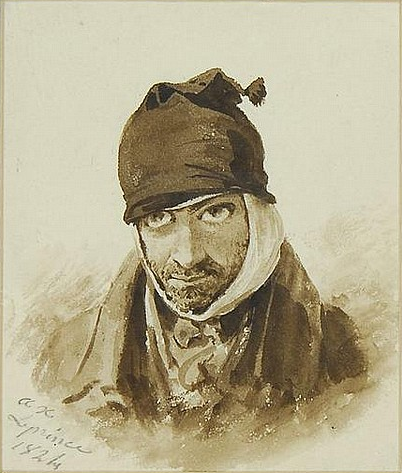
Léopold [Leprince] malade, 1824, private collection.

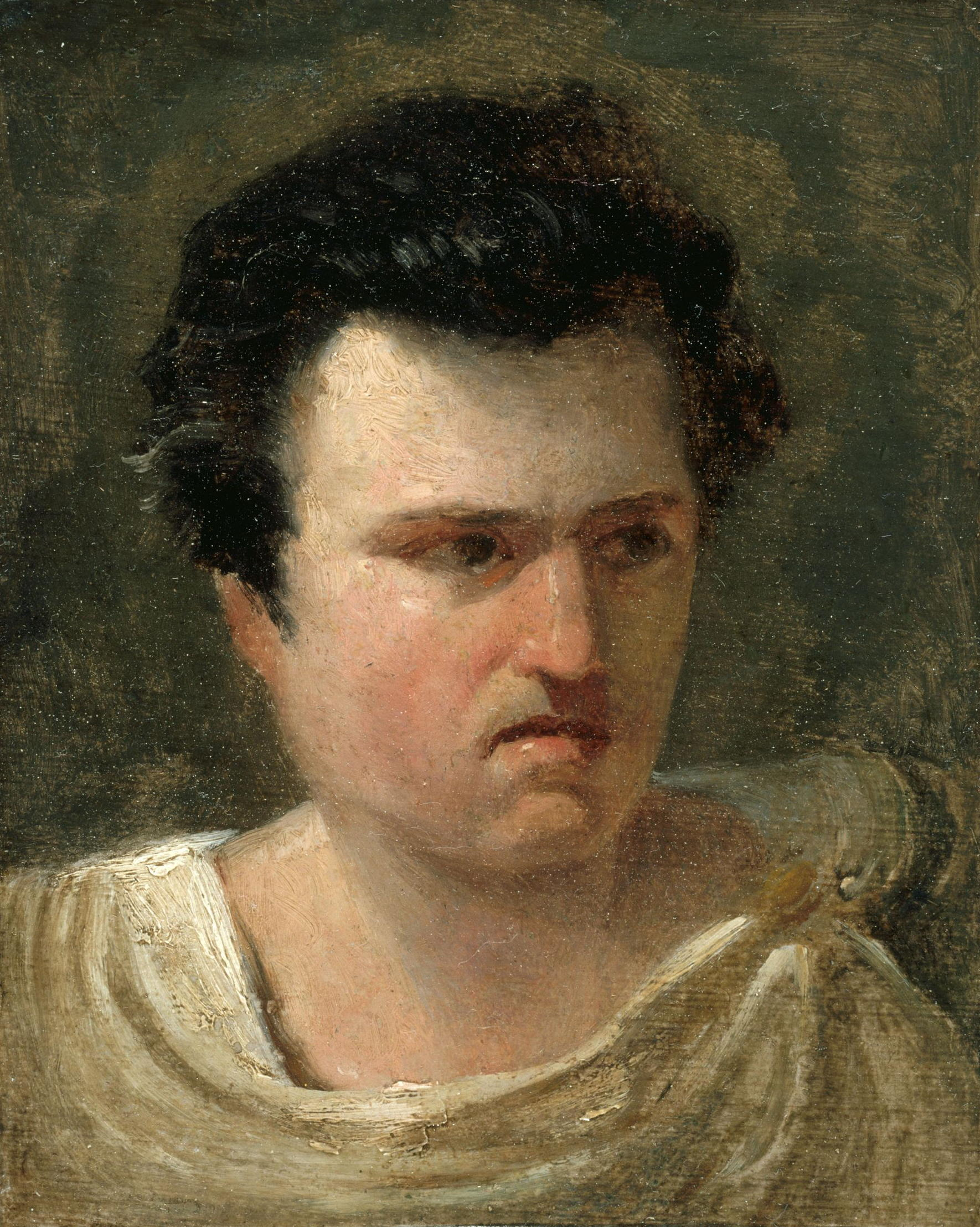
Portrait of François-Joseph Talma (attributed), undated, Musée Carnavalet.

== Death ==
With the publication of Inconvéniens d'un Voyage en Diligence, and his work on major commissions from du Sommerard, 1826 was a busy and productive year for Leprince, but at some point he became ill. When the condition lingered and his health deteriorated, doctors advised a move to a milder climate; Leprince went with his father to Nice. "We had conceived the hope that the beautiful sky in the south of France would restore him to health; but this hope has been deceived!" lamented Féréol Bonnemaison.

The symptoms and attempted cure suggest tuberculosis. Bonnemaison calls it a "long-lasting pulmonary condition." Du Sommerard describes "a chest condition" and a "long agony," and the attempted cure: "he was forced, according to the opinion of the doctors, to tear himself away, a few months ago…to go and expire in a foreign place, in that privileged climate which a barbaric routine and, often, an even more barbaric sensibility unnecessarily assign as a resource to our patients, for whom it almost always becomes the tomb."

On the day after Christmas, 1826, Xavier Leprince died in Nice. "His last sighs were received by his father, whom no consideration, even that of serious infirmities, could separate from his son, until the fatal event which brought him back alone."

== Legacy ==
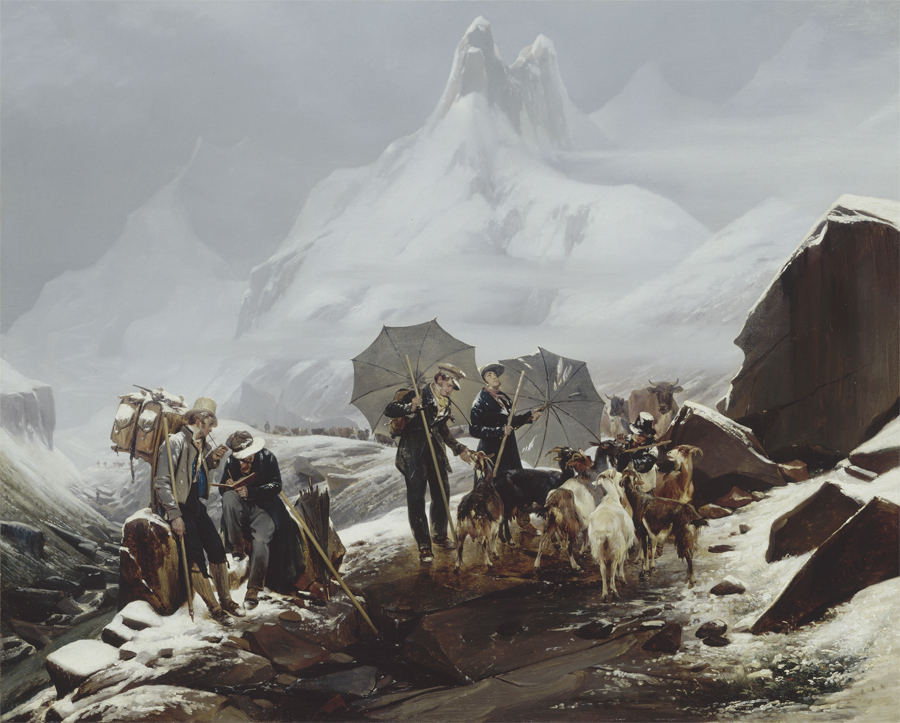
In the "stunning"Paysage de Susten en Suisse (1824, Louvre Museum), the figure seen sketching may a self-portrait by Leprince. The painting was purchased for 1,500 francs by the French State.

Leprince's works testify to strong fraternal and paternal ties, a high-spirited sense of humor, immense energy, and expansive talents. The shared grief evoked by his premature death is cited by Bonnemaison, who says that "his friends, the most distinguished artists of all genres, the most commendable men of all ranks, shared and still share his parents' pain. He lives in everyone's memory, less perhaps by the originality of his talent than by the graces of his mind and the constant gentleness of his character!" The obituary in La Nouveauté also noted Leprince's gentle disposition.

As a teacher, Leprince, in du Sommerard's words, "left behind two brothers whom he was keen to make rivals." Gustave Leprince showed a number of landscapes at the Paris Salon from 1831 to 1837, but his career, like that of his oldest brother, was cut short by an early death (in 1837, at age twenty-six or twenty-seven). Léopold Leprince enjoyed considerable success as a landscape painter, exhibited works at the Paris Salon from 1822 to 1844, and had paintings acquired by a number of French museums, including three at the Louvre. Among Leprince's other successful pupils were Nicolas Alexandre Barbier, Pierre-Jean Boquet, Eugène Lepoittevin, and Charles Mozin.

In a career of only ten years, Leprince accomplished much, but he remained humble about his achievements. Du Sommerard says that Leprince "was not so deceived" by quick success "as to believe himself to be an accomplished artist. Tormented by the thought, mature beyond his years, 'that a name too soon famous is a heavy burden,' he felt the need to strengthen his natural talents by continual and perhaps too constant study, in the hope of satisfying both the taste of art-lovers and the more demanding expectations of the masters of art."

A generation after his death, Leprince would be remembered as "one of the most elegant painters of the 19th century school," and in 1886 Paul Marmottan would declare him a "great artist" possessing a talent "very spirited, very French." The 1904 edition of Bryan's Dictionary of Painters and Engravers would note that Leprince's "village fairs, carnivals, corps de garde, and a great variety of other subjects are to be found in some of the best collections." The art historian Henry Marcel found Leprince's work akin to that of Boilly, "but with a greater variety of motifs and a more lively style."

Leprince's works continue to attract collectors, as well as curatorial interest, as can be seen by the display of his paintings at both the Louvre and the Metropolitan Museum, and a drive to acquire his works by the Nationalmuseum in Stockholm. But there has not been a large-scale exhibit dedicated to his works, and no catalogue raissoné has been published.

== Leprince in Museums ==
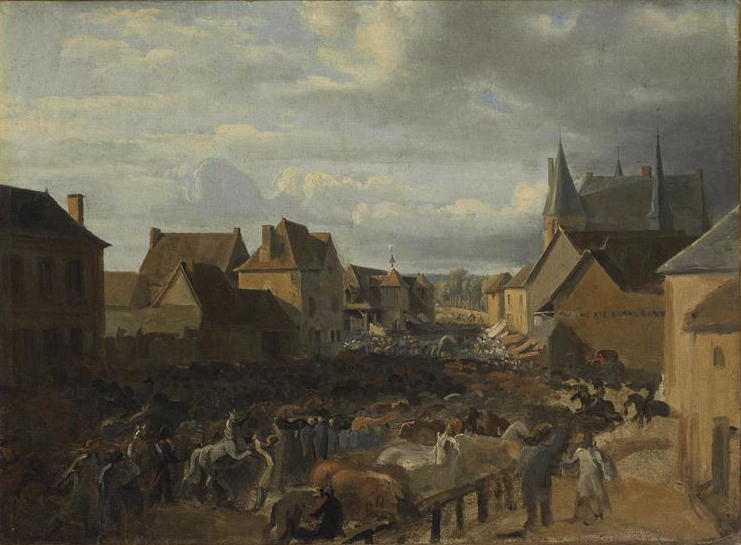
Marché aux chevaux dans un bourg normand, undated, Musée Magnin, Dijon.

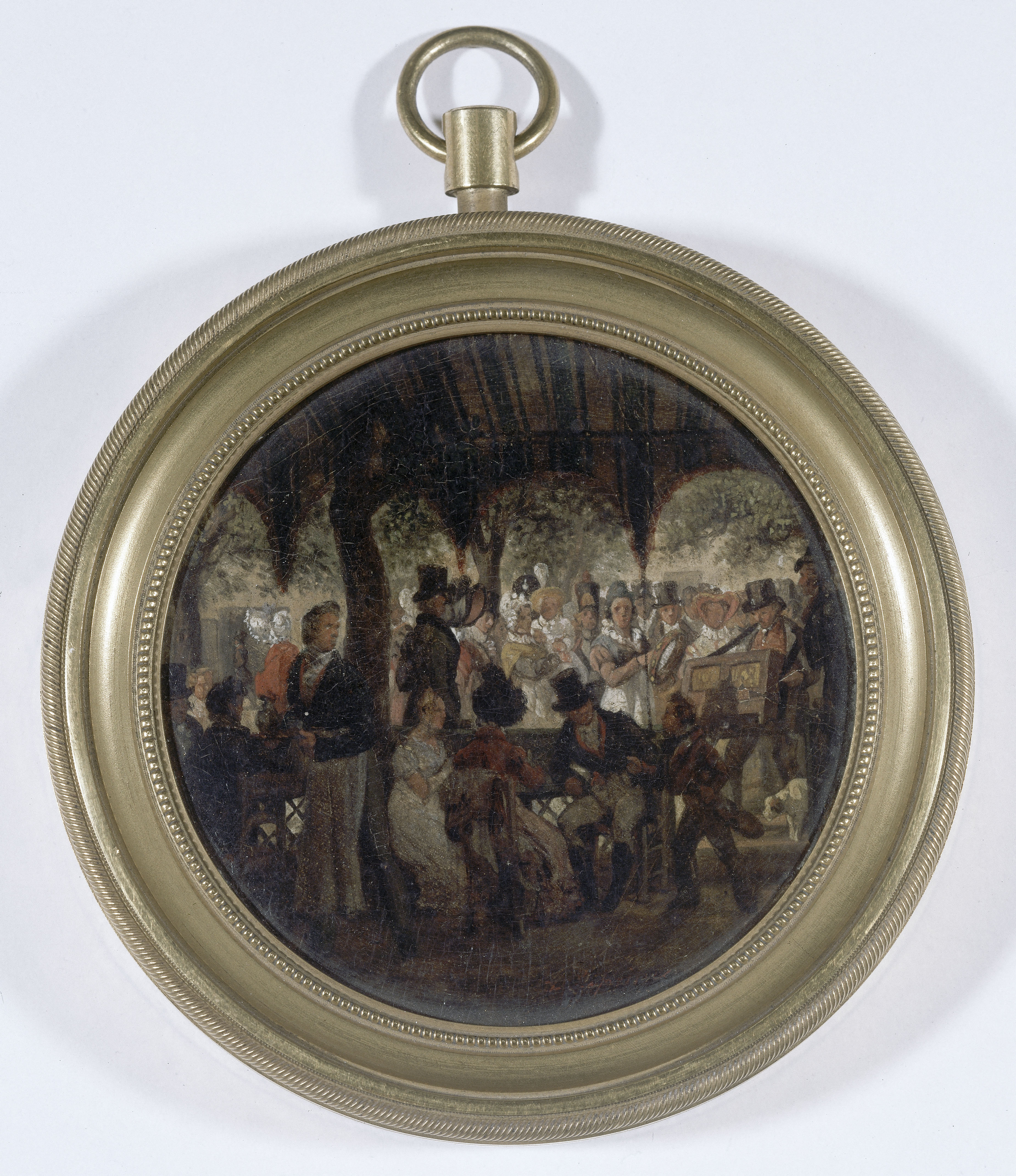
Concert dans un jardin public, c. 1820, Musée Carnavalet.

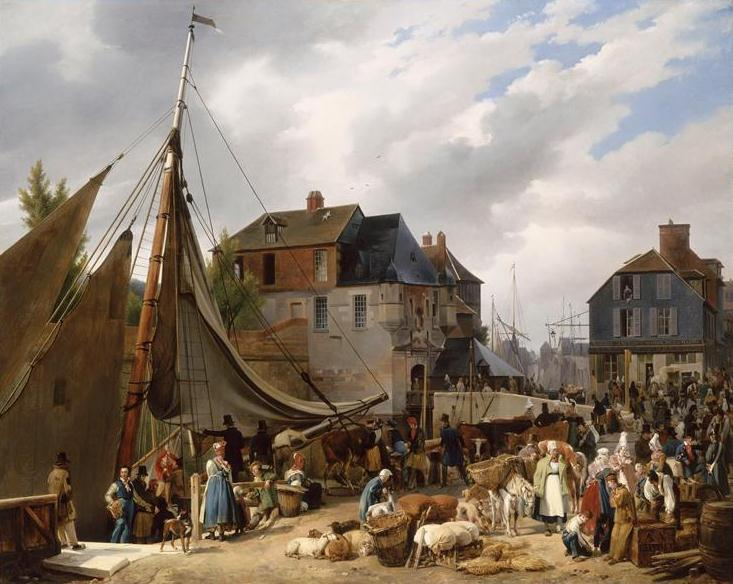
Embarquement de bestiaux sur le Passager dans le port de Honfleur, 1823, Louvre Museum.

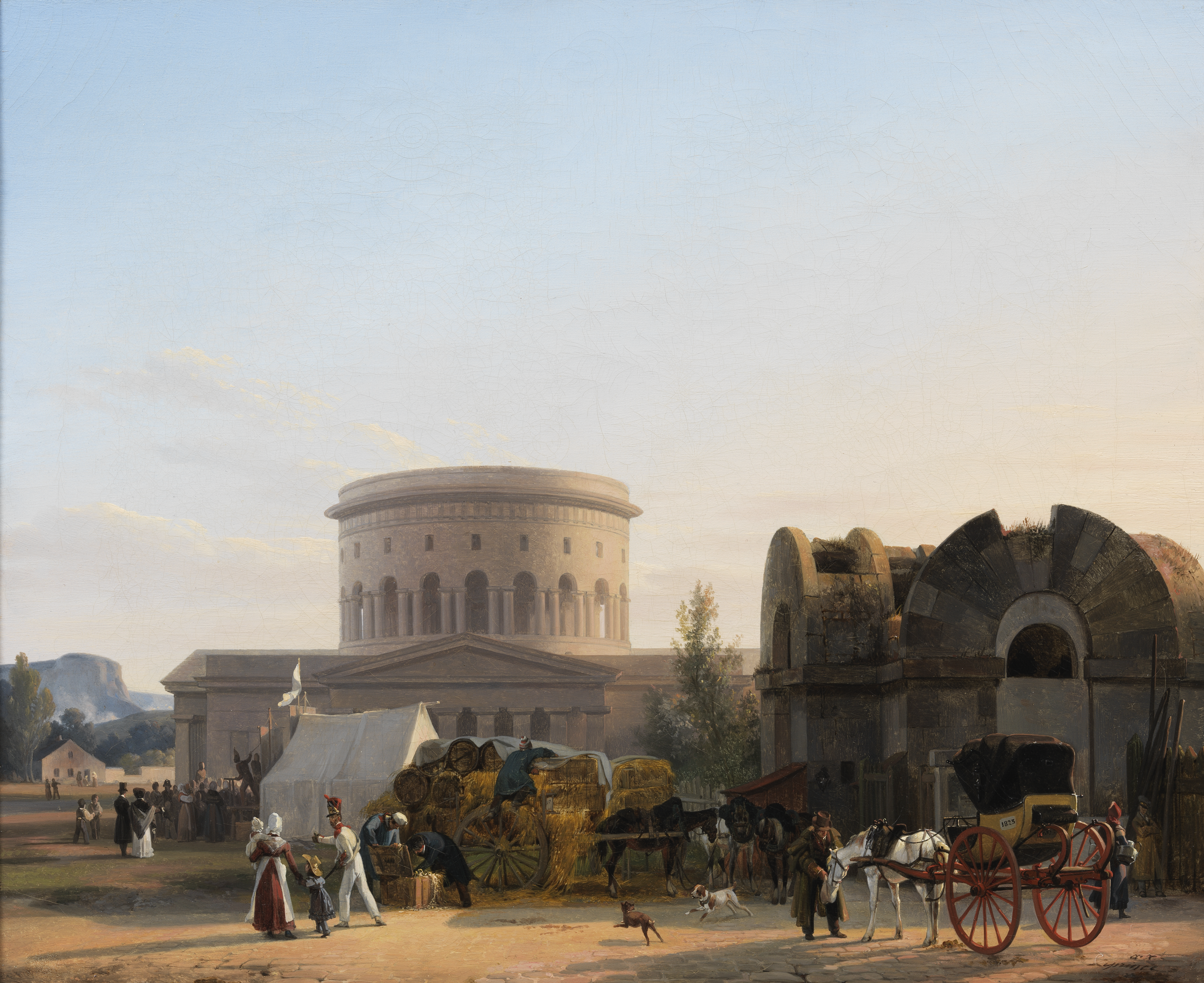
La Barrière de la Villette, 1823, Nationalmuseum, Stockholm.

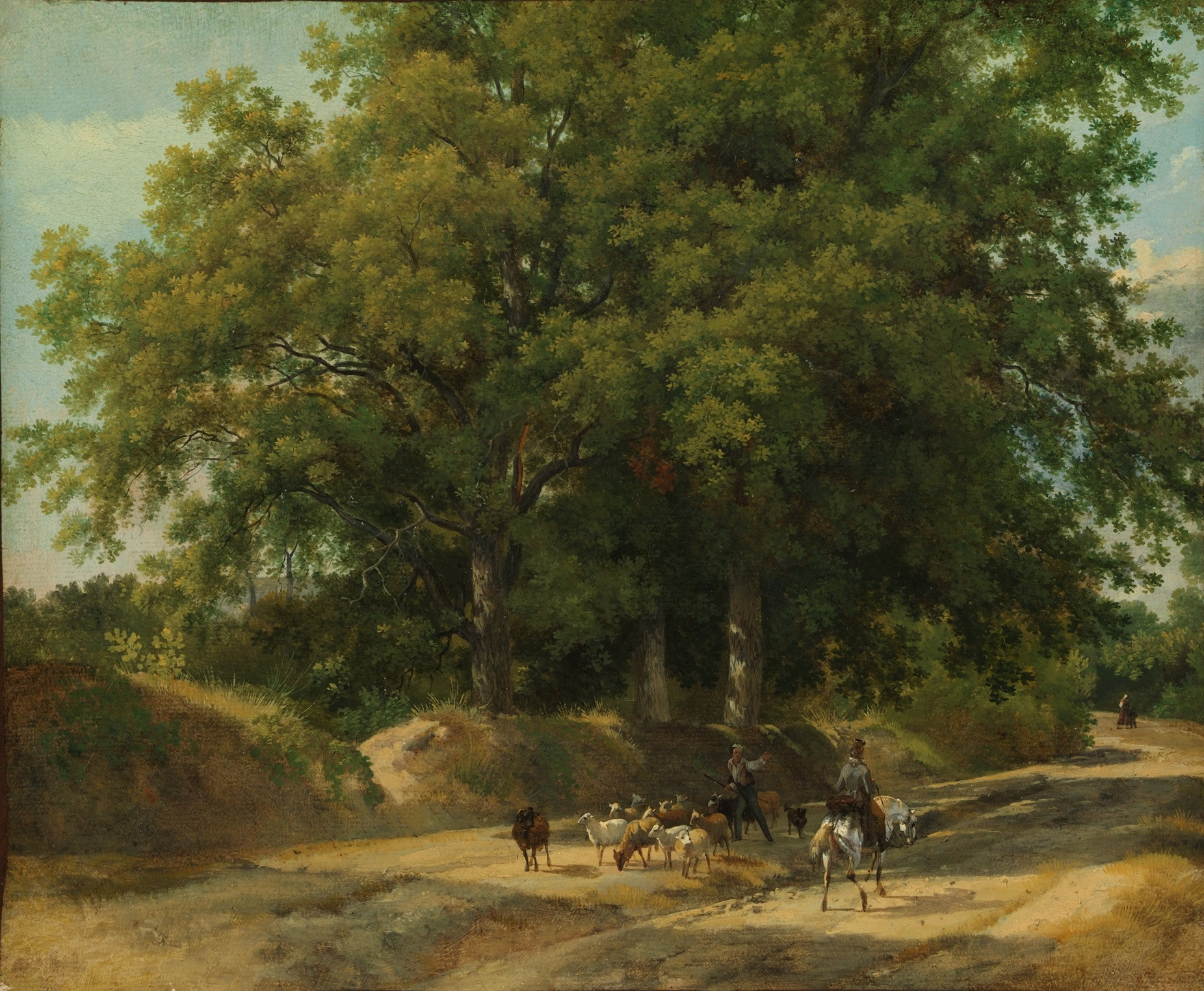
A Shepherd and a Rider on a Country Lane, c. 1823, Metropolitan Museum of Art.

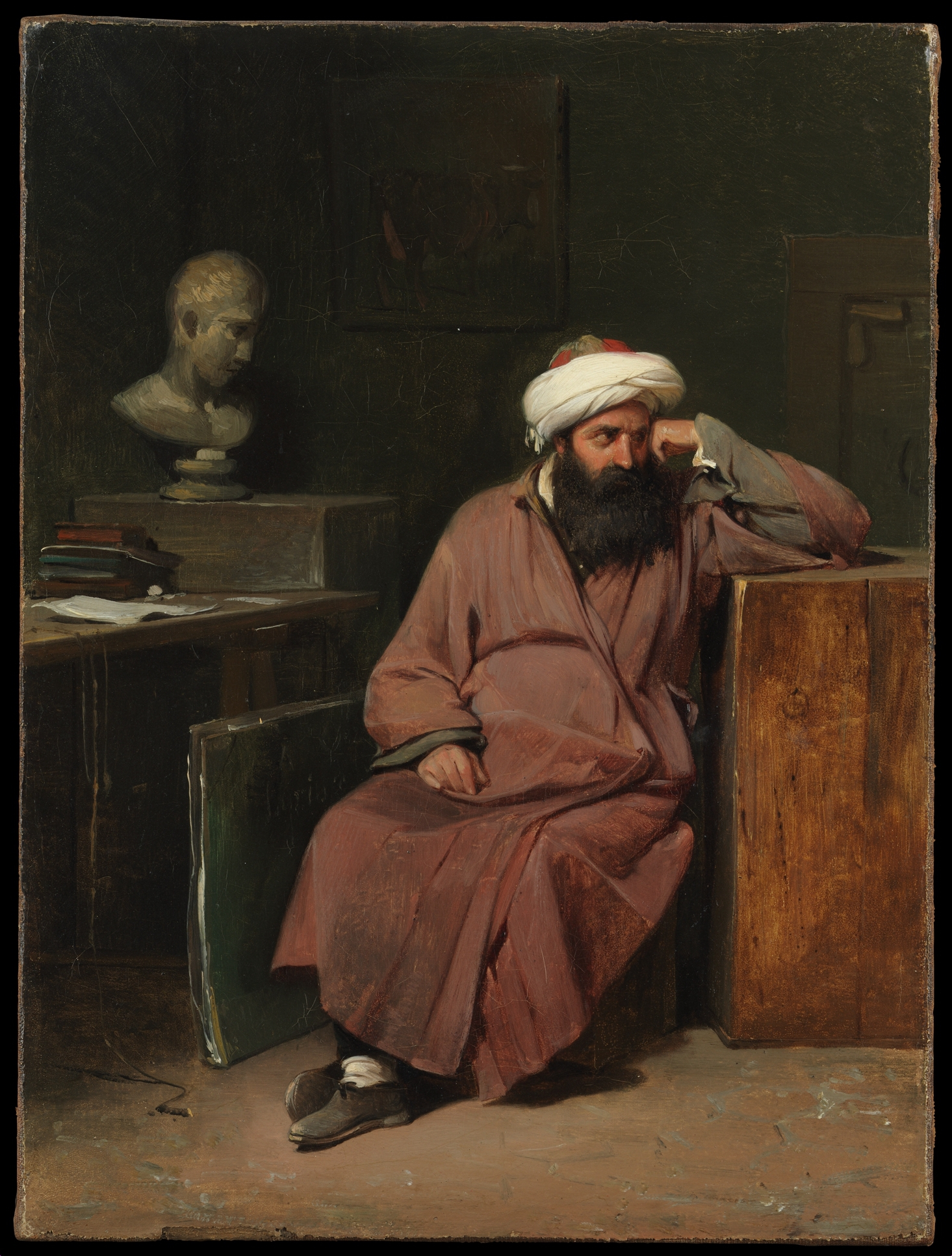
Man in Oriental Costume in the Artist's Studio, c. 1823-1826, Metropolitan Museum of Art.

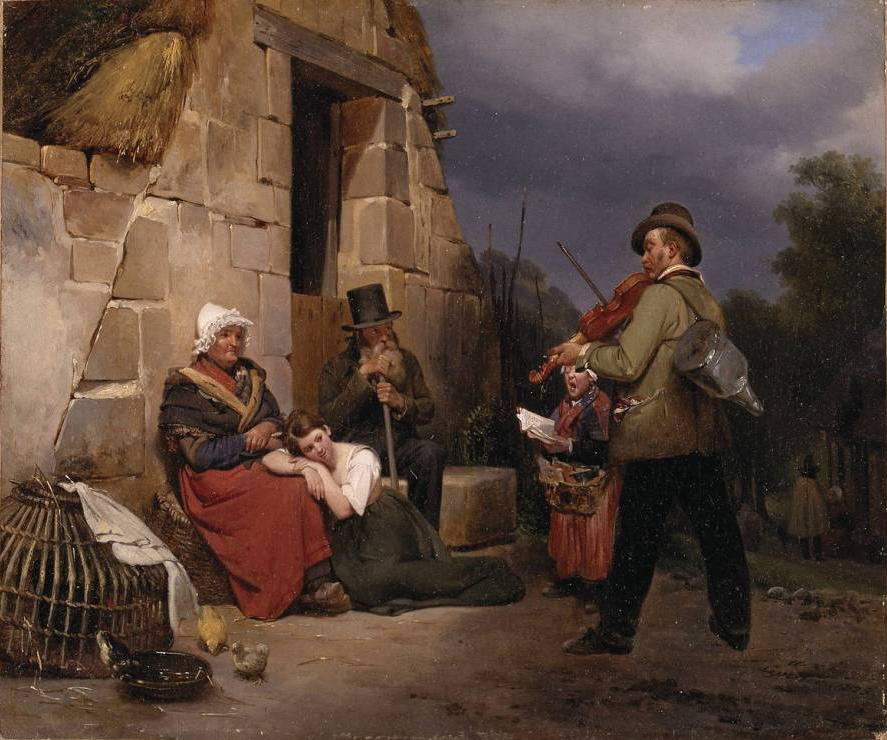
Le marchand de chansons, 1825, Museum of European and Mediterranean Civilisations, Marseille.

=== Paris ===
- Embarquement de bestiaux sur le Passager dans le port de , 1823, Louvre Museum.
- Paysage de Susten en Suisse, 1824, Louvre Museum.
- Leprince's sketchbooks, with hundreds of drawings, Louvre Museum.
- L'aqueduc d'Arcueil, 1820, Musée Carnavalet.
- Concert dans un jardin public, c. 1820, Musée Carnavalet.
- Portrait of François-Joseph Talma (attributed), before 1827, Musée Carnavalet.
- Carnaval au Boulevard du Temple and La fête des Loges, photographs c. 1900 by Albert Brichaut of two otherwise unknown paintings by Leprince, Musée Carnavalet.
- Le port d'Honfleur, l'embarquement des bestiaux, c. 1823, Petit Palais.

=== Dijon ===
- L'Aveugle et les enfants, watercolor, 1822, Musée Magnin, Dijon.
- Pêcheur ficelant une bourriche de poissons, c. 1826, Musée Magnin, Dijon.
- Intérieur d'atelier (attributed), c. 1826, Musée Magnin, Dijon.
- Le Peintre dans son atelier (attributed), c. 1826, Musée Magnin, Dijon.
- Marché aux chevaux dans un bourg normand, Musée Magnin, Dijon.

=== Elsewhere in France ===
- Paysage et berger, 1820, Musée des Beaux-Arts et d'Archéologie de Châlons-en-Champagne.
- Simon Chénard in the play "Félix ou l'Enfant trouvé", 1821, Musée d'art et d'histoire Saint-Germain, Auxerre.
- Halte des peintres à Fontainebleau, c. 1824, Musée départemental de l'Oise, Beauvais.
- Paysage, bergere sur un ane, 1817, Musée des Beaux-Arts de Bordeaux.
- Paysage, chemin montagneux, 1817, Musée des Beaux-Arts de Bordeaux.
- Paysage avec une charette (attributed), Musée des beaux-arts, Chambéry.
- Paysage (attributed), Musée des beaux-arts, Chambéry.
- Portrait of Anne-Pierre Leprince and Portrait of Gustave Leprince, 1824, Musée des Beaux-Arts de Chartres.
- Vue d'une prairie by Alexandre Hyacinthe Dunouy, with figures by Leprince, Musée Thomas-Henry, Cherbourg-Octeville.
- Le marchand de chansons, 1825, Museum of European and Mediterranean Civilisations, Marseille
- Vieillard enchaîné dans un cachot, Musée d'art et d'histoire de Narbonne.
- Henri IV faisant entrer des vivres dans Paris qu'il assiège, gouache, 1821, Musée national du château de Pau.
- Un chasseur a l'affut (attributed), Musée Crozatier, Le Puy-en-Velay
- Paysage, étude, 181?, Musée des beaux-arts de Rouen.

=== United States ===
- A Shepherd and a Rider on a Country Lane, c. 1823, Metropolitan Museum of Art, New York.
- Man in Oriental Costume in the Artist's Studio, c. 1823-1826, Metropolitan Museum of Art, New York.
- The Artist's Studio, completed by Eugène Lepoittevin, 1827, Chazen Museum of Art, University of Wisconsin–Madison
- Watercolor sketches, Clark Art Institute, Williamstown, Massachusetts.

=== Sweden ===
- Eight works by Leprince, all acquired since 2016, including the oil on paper sketch Studio Interior with Artists Working, 1820, Nationalmuseum, Stockholm.

== Leprince at auction ==
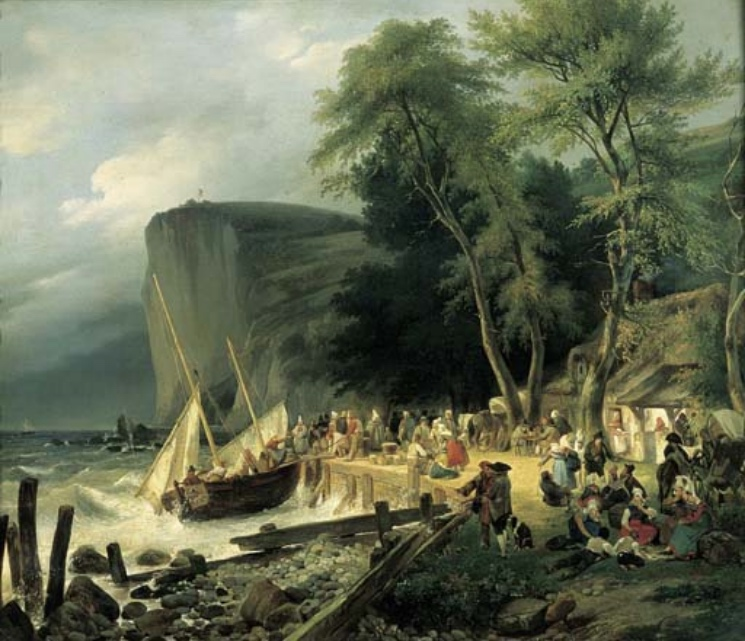
A view of the coast at Le Havre by La Hève, 1825.

A record price for a painting by Leprince was set by La Moisson (1822), auctioned for €60,000 at Christie's in Paris in 2007. Other notable results include €52,875 for Les Patineurs (1823), Christie's Paris, 2003; $28,200 for A view of the coast at Le Havre by La Hève (1825), Christie's New York, 2000; and $24,000 for Landscape with a Farmhouse and Bridge (undated), Sotheby's New York, 2007.

Historical prices for works by Leprince include the 1859 auction of Une Fête de village for 700 francs and the 1907 auction in Paris of two small paintings dated 1819, Le Départ de la diligence and L’Arrivée de la diligence, which sold for $4,500, equivalent to $128,870 in 2021.

== Bibliography of publications by Leprince ==
- Leprince, Xavier (1822). Les Jeux des jeunes garçons représentés en 25 gravures à l'aqua-tints, d'après les dessins de Xavier Le Prince; avec l'explication détaillée des règles de chaque jeu; accompagnées de fables nouvelles par MM. Le Franc, Armand-Gouffé, etc. et suivis d'anecdotes relatives à chaque jeu, 5th edition, Paris: chez Nepveu, 1822.
- Leprince, Xavier (1823). Jeux des jeunes filles de tous les pays, representés en vingt-cinq lithograhies dápres ou par MM. Xavier le Prince, Colin et Noel, offrant des coutumes de toutes les nations: avec l'explication detaillee des règles de chaque jeu : accompagnes de fables, Paris: chez Nepveu et Alphonse Girou, 1823.
- Leprince, Xavier (1825). Six petits tableaux, six lithographs on papier de Chine from the collection of M. du Sommerard including Le Départ, l'Arrivée, la Laitière, Saint Louis rendant la justice, la Fête-Dieu and l'Ecole de village, Paris: chez Motte, 1825.
- Leprince, Xavier (1826). Inconvéniens d'un Voyage en Diligence, twelve hand-colored plates, original drawings by Leprince, lithography by Pierre Langlumé, Paris: Sazerac et Duval, 1826.
- Leprince, Xavier (attributed, 1826). Métamorphoses d'Arlequin. Parades: Jouées sur le Théâtre Français, twelve hand-colored plates, lithography by Pierre Langlumé, Brussels, 1826.
- Leprince, Xavier, and Jacottet, Louis-Julien (1827). Vues pittoresques du Dauphiné et du Lyonnais, dessinées d'après nature, sixteen lithographs on papier de Chine, Paris: Engelmann, Giraldon Bovinel, 1827.

== Bibliography ==
- Bellier de La Chavignerie, Émile and Auvray, Louis. Dictionnaire général des artistes de l'École française depuis l'origine des arts du dessin jusqu'à nos jours: architectes, peintres, sculpteurs, graveurs et lithographes, vol. 1, Paris: 1882-1885.
- Bénard, Pierre. "Du Sommerard à Provins: Le Plaisir des Ruines en 1822", Sites et monuments: bulletin de la Société pour la protection des paysages et de l'esthétique générale de la France, July 1988, pp. 10–13.
- Bolton, Roy and Strachan, Edward. "August-Xavier Leprince, The Harvest" in Russia & Europe in the Nineteenth Century, gallery catalogue, Sphinx Fine Art, 2002, pp. 52–53.
- Bonnemaison, Féréol. Galerie de son Altesse Royale Madame la duchesse de Berry, Tome 2: École française, Peintres modernes, notes on Les Patineurs and La Moisson (includes remarks on Leprince's recent death; he is incorrectly called Anne-Xavier Leprince), pages unnumbered, 1827.
- Du Sommerard, Alexandre (1822). Vues de Provins, dessinées et lithographiées, en 1822, par plusieurs artistes, avec un texte par M. D., Paris: chez Gide, 1822; four images by Xavier Leprince and four by Léopold Leprince.
- Du Sommerard, Alexandre (1827). "Notice Nécrologique sur M. Xavier Leprince, Peintre de genre, mort à Nice le 26 décembre 1826", Journal des artistes, 28 January 1827, pp. 56–58.
- Explication des ouvrages de peinture et dessins, sculpture, architecture et gravure des artistes vivans exposé au Musée Royal des Arts le 25 Août 1819, "Le Prince" entries numbered 746-751, p. 82.
- Explication des ouvrages de peinture et dessins, sculpture, architecture et gravure des artistes vivans exposé au Musée Royal des Arts le 4 Novembre 1827, Paris: Ballard, 1827.
- Gabet, Charles. Dictionnaire des artistes de l'école française au XIXe siècle, Paris: Chez Madame Vergne, 1831.
- Gertz, Stephen J. "The Gentle Art of Regurgitation During Travel by Coach, 1826", Booktryst blog, 27 September 2011.
- Haverkamp-Begemann, Egbert, Standish D. Lawder, and Charles W. Talbot, Jr. Drawings from the Clark Art Institute: A Catalogue Raisonné of the Robert Sterling Clark Collection of European and American Drawings, Sixteenth Through Nineteenth Centuries, at the Sterling and Francine Clark Art Institute, Williamstown, 2 volumes, New Haven: Yale University Press, 1964.
- Jal, A. Esquisses, croquis, pochades, ou, Tout ce qu'on voudra, sur le Salon de 1827, Paris: Ambroise Dupont et Cie, 1827.
- Landon, C.P. "Les Médecins français et les Sœurs de Saint-Camille à Barcelone; tableau de M. Xavier Le Prince" in Annales du Musée et de l'École moderne des beaux-arts: Salon de 1822, Paris: Landon, 1822, vol. 2, pp. 53–56 and fold-out plates 31 and 32.
- Lejeune, Théodore Michel. Guide théorique et pratique de l'amateur de tableaux: études sur les imitateurs et les copistes des maîtres de toutes les écoles, dont les oeuvres forment la base ordinaire des galeries, Paris: Gide, 1863-1865.
- Les Salons retrouvés. Eclat de la vie artistique dans la France du Nord, Lille: Associations des Conservateurs des Musées du Nord-Pas de Calais, 1993; he is incorrectly called Anne Xavier Leprince; see vol. 1, pp. 83, 120, 127-128, 203, 223; vol. 2, pp. 113, 186.
- Marcel, Henry Camille. La peinture française au XIXe siècle, Paris: A. Picard & Kaan, 1905.
- Marmottan, Paul, L'École française de peinture (1789-1839), Paris: H. Laurens, 1886.
- Marumo, Claude. Barbizon et les paysagistes du XIXe, Éditions de l'amateur, 1975.
- Miel, Edmé François Antoine Marie. Revue critique des productions de peinture, sculpture, gravure, exposées au Salon de 1824, Paris: J.G. Dentu, 1825.
- Miller, Asher Ethan. "The Path of Nature: French Paintings from the Wheelock Whitney Collection, 1785–1850." Metropolitan Museum of Art Bulletin 70 (Winter 2013), p. 46, fig. 63 (A Shepherd and a Rider on a Country Lane) and fig. 64 (Man in Oriental Costume in the Artist's Studio).
- Notice de tableaux, dessins et estampes... vente par suite du décès de M. Xavier Leprince... 12 mars 1827... (catalogue of a sale of Leprince's works, by his family, about eleven weeks after his death, consisting of 267 lots), Paris: Imprimerie de A. Coniam, 1827, 22 pages.
- Olausson, Magnus. "In the Artist's Studio: Auguste-Xavier Leprince and the Studio Interior as an Artistic Strategy", Art Bulletin of Nationalmuseum Stockholm 26:1 (2019), pp. 53–58.
- Sébille, Nadège. "Biographie d’Eugène Le Poittevin" in L'invention d'Étretat: Eugène Le Poittevin, un peintre et ses amis à l'aube de l'impressionnisme, Fécamp: éditions des Falaises, 2020, pp. 28–43.
- Tinterow, Gary; Pantazzi, Michael; Pomarède, Vincent. Corot, New York: Metropolitan Museum of Art, 1996.
- Philippe Cendron, Anne Xavier Leprince (1799-1826). Un « petit maître » parisien sous la Restauration, Cahiers du val de Bargis, Toulouse, CoolLibri, 2024 ISBN 9-791039-687331.
