= Eugène Lepoittevin =

French painter (1806–1870)

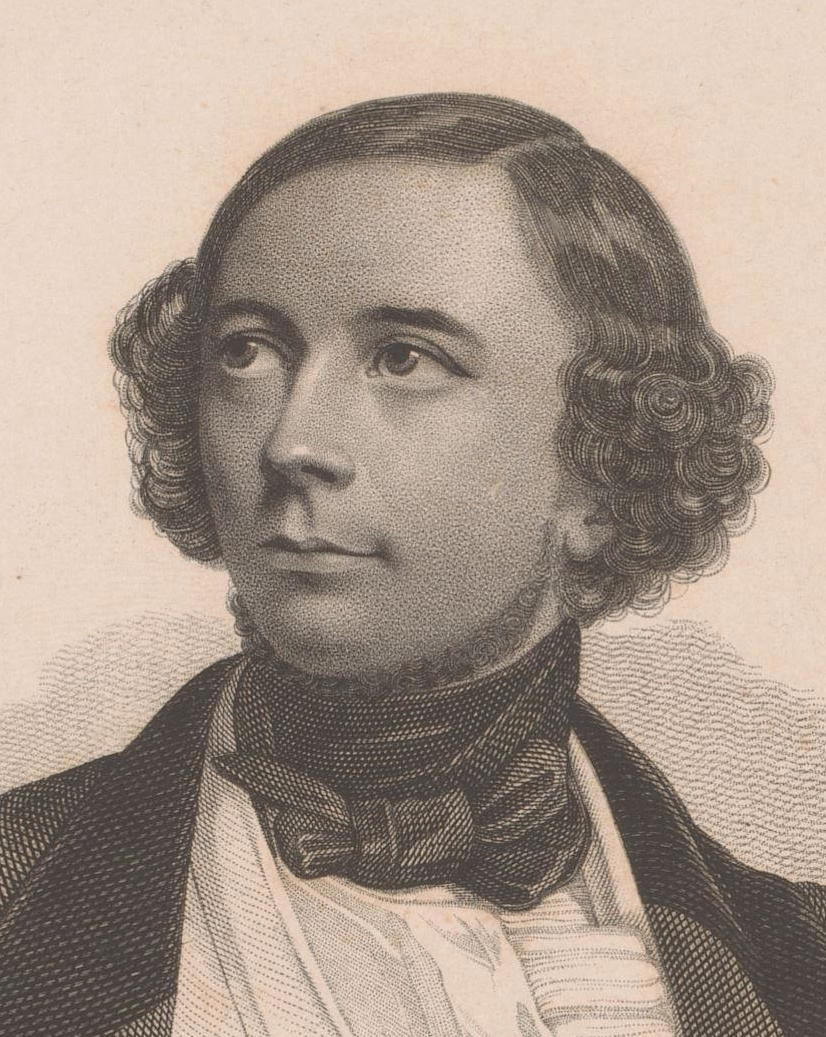
- Portrait by Charles Baugniet, 1838
- Born: Eugène Modeste Edmond Poidevin; 31 July 1806; Paris, France
- Died: 6 August 1870 (aged 64); Paris, France
- Other names: Variants include Eugène Modeste Edmond Poidevin, Eugène Le Poitevin, Eugène Lepoittevin, Eugène Le Poittevin, Édouard Le Poittevin, E. Lepoittevin.
- Education: École des Beaux-Arts; Louis Hersent; Auguste Xavier Leprince
- Occupations: painter; lithographer; caricaturist.
- Known for: Marine art; History painting; Erotica
- Works: Charges et décharges diaboliques, 1830 (censored and ordered destroyed in 1846); Les Bains de Mer, Plage d’Étretat, 1864
- Title: Peintre de la Marine, 1849
- Awards: Knight of the Legion of Honor, 1843; Knight of the Order of Leopold, 1845

Signature
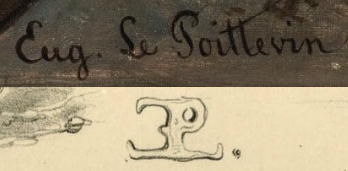

Eugène Lepoittevin (31 July 1806 – 6 August 1870), also known as Poidevin, Poitevin, and Le Poittevin, was a French artist who achieved an early and lifelong success as a landscape and maritime painter. His work ranged from erotic caricatures to massive battle scenes. His works are in the collections of many museums throughout France. He made many paintings set in and around the fishing village of Étretat, and in 2020 he was the subject of an exhibition and book, L'invention d'Étretat: Eugène Le Poittevin, un peintre et ses amis à l'aube de l'impressionnisme (The invention of Étretat: Eugène Le Poittevin, a painter and his friends at the dawn of Impressionism).

== Family and personal life ==
Eugène Lepoittevin was born as Eugène Modeste Edmond Poidevin on 31 July 1806 in Paris. He was the son of Nicolas Potdevin of Rouen in Normandy, who moved to Paris and became chief cabinetmaker at the Palace of Versailles. Over time, Nicholas Potdevin changed the family name to Poidevin, Poitevin and then Lepoittevin.

Lepoittevin married Stéphanie Anastasie Maillard (born 1825) in 1844 or 1845. They had two daughters, Eugènie Adélaïde Fanny (born 1846) and Marie Eugènie (born 1847). Stéphanie died in 1851. In 1861, Lepoittevin married Marie Adélaïde Françoise Pironin (born c. 1812). He died 6 August 1870 at the house of his first daughter Eugènie and her husband, the tenor Léon Achard, in Auteuil, which is today the 16th arrondissement of Paris.

He was not, as is sometimes stated, a relative of Guy de Maupassant, who was a first cousin and close friend of another painter, Louis Le Poittevin (1847–1909). However, Lepoittevin and the much younger Guy de Maupassant were friends, and Maupassant as a young man (not yet famous) is thought to appear in Lepoittevin's paintings of the beach crowd at Étretat. Under the nom de plume Maufrigneuse, Maupassant would later relate some anecdotes about Lepoittevin in the pages of the periodical Gil Blas.

A younger contemporary described Lepoittevin as physically small and slender, temperamentally kind, alert and cheerful, silly or serious depending on the hour. Biographer Nadège Sébille describes him as a man who loved jokes and exuded an infectious joie de vivre.

== Career ==
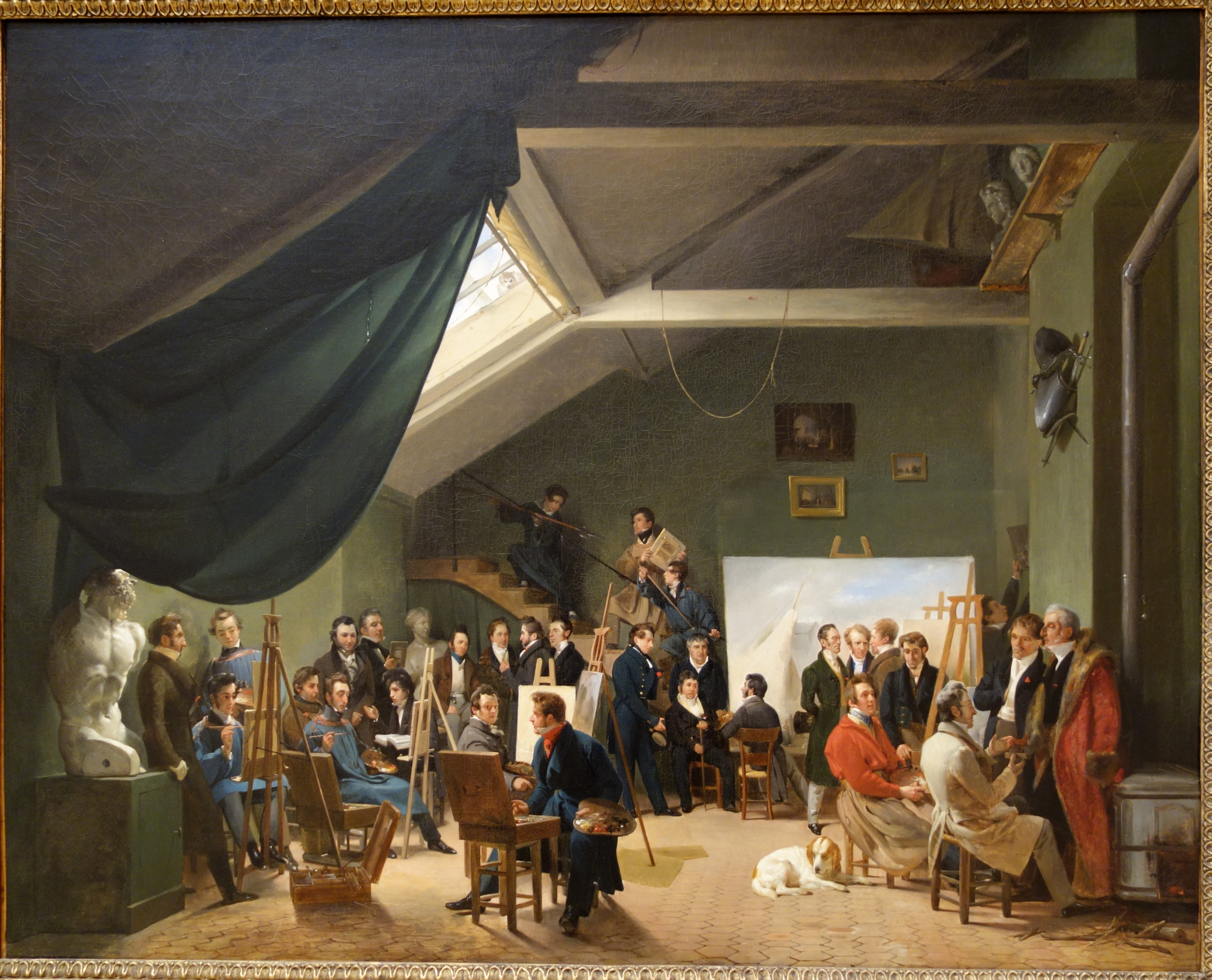
Auguste Xavier Leprince and Eugène Lepoittevin, The Artist's Studio, 1827, Chazen Museum of Art, Madison

In 1826, at the age of 20, Eugène was enrolled at the École des Beaux-Arts. He studied painting under Louis Hersent and Auguste Xavier Leprince. His stature in the atelier of Leprince and his ability to match the skill of the master were such that when Leprince died, Lepoittevin was commissioned to complete Leprince's unfinished Interieur de l'atelier de feu Leprince (The Artist's Studio), exhibited at the Paris Salon of 1827; biographer Nadège Sébille presumes the seated figure at far left is a self-portrait of the young Lepoittevin. Also in 1827, at the age of 21, Lepoittevin debuted at the Paris Salon, under the name Potdevin. Up to and including the year of his death in 1870, he would exhibit over 150 paintings at the annual Salon.

In the 1830s, Lepoittevin became a prolific lithographer and caricaturist, with work appearing in the popular periodical La Caricature. Following the July Revolution of 1830, Lepoittevin published the ironically titled Souvenir patriotiques, a series of sardonic lithographs depicting scenes from the revolution in Paris. At about this time he also published Ombres Fantastiques, an album of twelve plates, each teeming with silhouettes that evoked, even as they subverted and satirized, the figures in the so-called Chinese shadows plays (ombres chinoises) popularized in France in the previous century by Dominique Séraphin; among the provocative silhouettes could be discerned a great many mischievous (and often flatulent) devils.

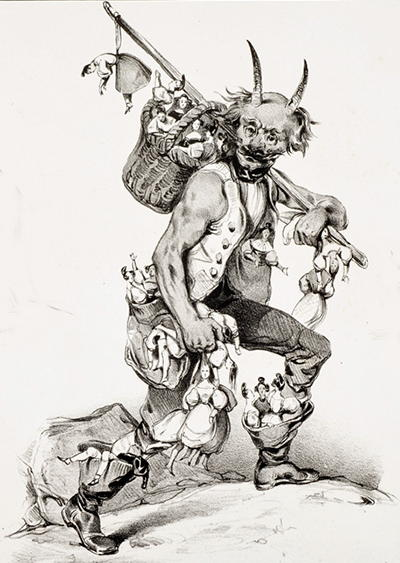
Eugène Lepoittevin, possible self-portrait from Les Diables de Lithographies, 1832

Lepoittevin's devils took center-stage in several albums of erotic lithographs depicting these imps and their hapless human partners; Lepoittevin's outlandish diableries became a sensation, inspiring imitators who spawned a whole genre of such works. At least two of Lepoittevin's diabolical albums were banned in France, including Charges et décharges diaboliques, which in 1845 was censored and then condemned to destruction as an outrage to public morals and good manners. As recently as 1951, the album was seized by U.S. Customs because "the dominant theme of the material taken as a whole appeals to prurient interest."

The Bibliothèque Nationale de France includes in its collection Diableries, an album of 20 of the artist's erotic lithographs, which is freely accessible online.

Beginning in 1834, while still in his twenties, Lepoittevin was commissioned by the State to paint official works for the historical museum at Versailles. These included military scenes (the Battle of Wertingen, 1805; the naval combat off the island of Embro, 1346; the siege of Beirut, 1109) and the more placid Lunch Offered to Queen Victoria in a Tent at Mont d'Orléans in the forest of Eu, 4 September 1843.

Lepoittevin drew inspiration from travels to many sites in France, as well as to England, the Netherlands, Belgium, Germany, Italy, and Algeria.

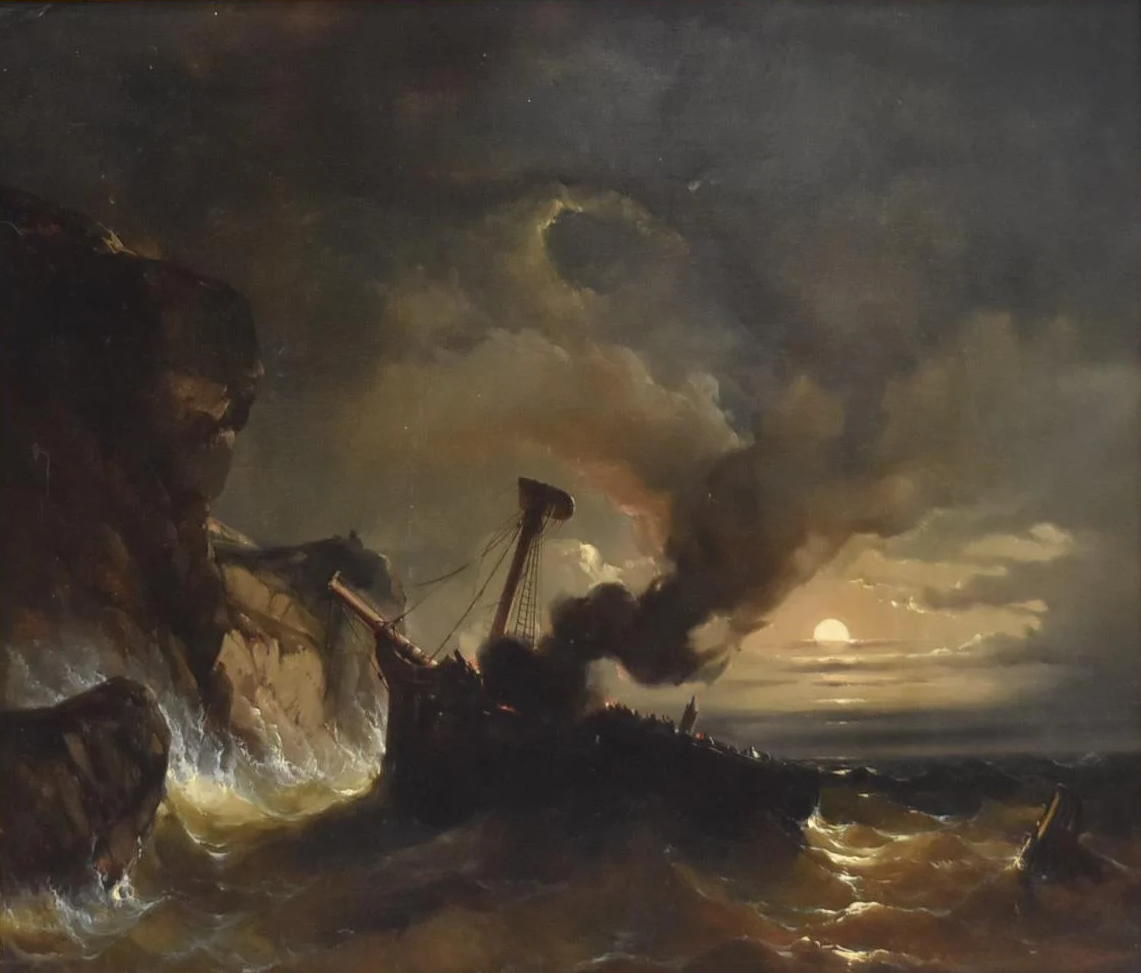
Shipwreck off the Cliffs of Dover at Night with Dover Castle in the Distance, undated, private collection

He became especially known for his maritime subjects, ranging from naval battles and shipwrecks to scenes of fisherman at work and swimmers relaxing at the beach. He was particularly fond of the fishing village of Étretat in Normandy, where in 1851 he built a chalet called La Chaufferette, about a hundred meters from the house where Guy de Maupassant spent his childhood. In the garden, Lepoittevin installed a fishing boat converted to a cabin where Maupassant liked to sleep. Lepoittevin also built a workshop by the sea, a two-story house with a large French window opening on the second-floor studio. According to Maupassant, it was in this atelier that Courbet would create his La Vague (The Wave) series of paintings. The flint structure weathered many storms until it was destroyed by the Nazis to clear the waterfront.

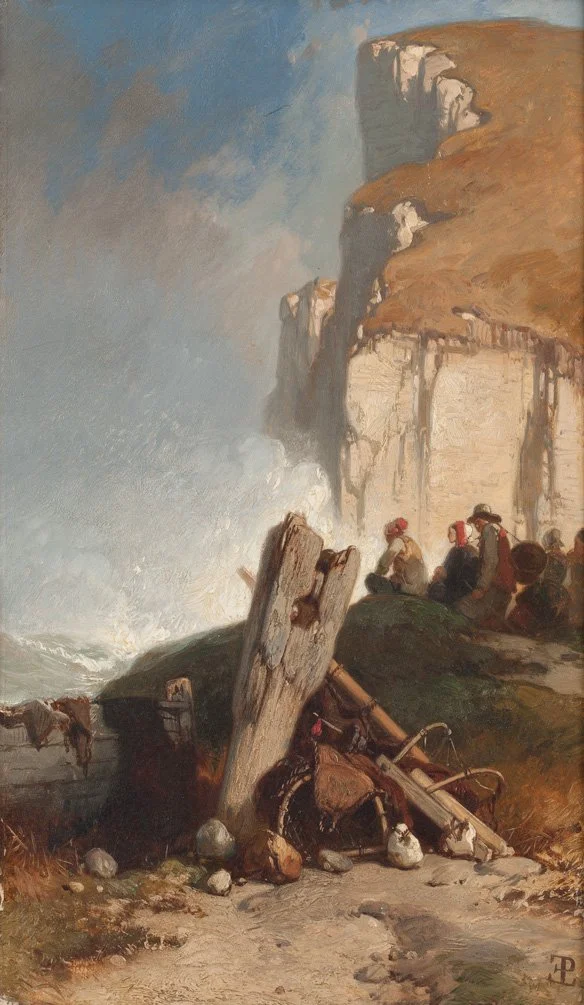
Fishing families on the beach at Étretat, undated, private collection

A glimpse of his social life in Étretat, and his sense of humor, is provided by a lengthy anecdote recounted by the anonymous Paris Diarist for Dwight's Journal of Music, about a house-warming potluck hosted by Lepoittevin at La Chaufferette in 1851. Each guest was to "furnish his or her own candle" and to bring one dish. The fish dish was to be provided by the host, to the relief of the rest because "in fishing ports, it is hardly possible to get fish; we can only enjoy the odor. The fishermen are hardly ashore before their booty is on its way to Paris. But our painter had made himself the friend, sponsor, crony, counsellor, and benevolent giver of old clothes to all the fishermen in the place, and could therefore be sure of obtaining the desired fish." When the dish was presented, the guests applauded to see such a huge specimen, with "all the colors of the rainbow, and a multitude of others…resplendent upon its scales." But when one of the guests cut a piece, "the slice, slipping from the knife, fell upon the table and flew into a thousand pieces! Then and not till then, we discovered that the famous fish was of clay, which the skillful Lepoittevin, unable to obtain the real thing, had modeled and painted with perfection sufficient to deceive anybody."

Lepoittevin also painted a historical series depicting marine artists and others who inspired his own painting. These artists are usually shown at work in the "studio" of the open air. These included Adriaen van de Velde Disembarking on Blanckenberg Beach, 1840; Paul Potter Drawing from Life in the Hague (aka Paul Potter Painting The Young Bull), 1843; Van de Velde, Who Usually Followed His Friend Ruyter in the Maritime Campaigns, Draws a Naval Combat from Nature, 1843; Van Dyck Receives a Drawing Lesson from his Mother, c. 1843; Van de Velde Studying the Effect of the Cannon his Friend Ruyter Fired for this Purpose, 1845; Bakhuizen Telling Stories of Piracy by Fishermen from Schweningen, 1845; Young Bakhuizen Contemplating the Effects of the Storm, 1847; Bakhuizen Offering his Purse to Sailors to Take Him on in Bad Weather, 1848; David Teniers the Younger leading Don Juan of Austria, His Pupil, to a Fair, 1848;Van de Velde Embarks to Go after Admiral Ruyter, his Friend, upon His Arrival in Rotterdam, 1850; Bakhuizen Drawing from Nature in the Dunes of Skeveningen, 1850; and The Painter, Scene from the Life of Adriaen Brouwer, c. 1860.

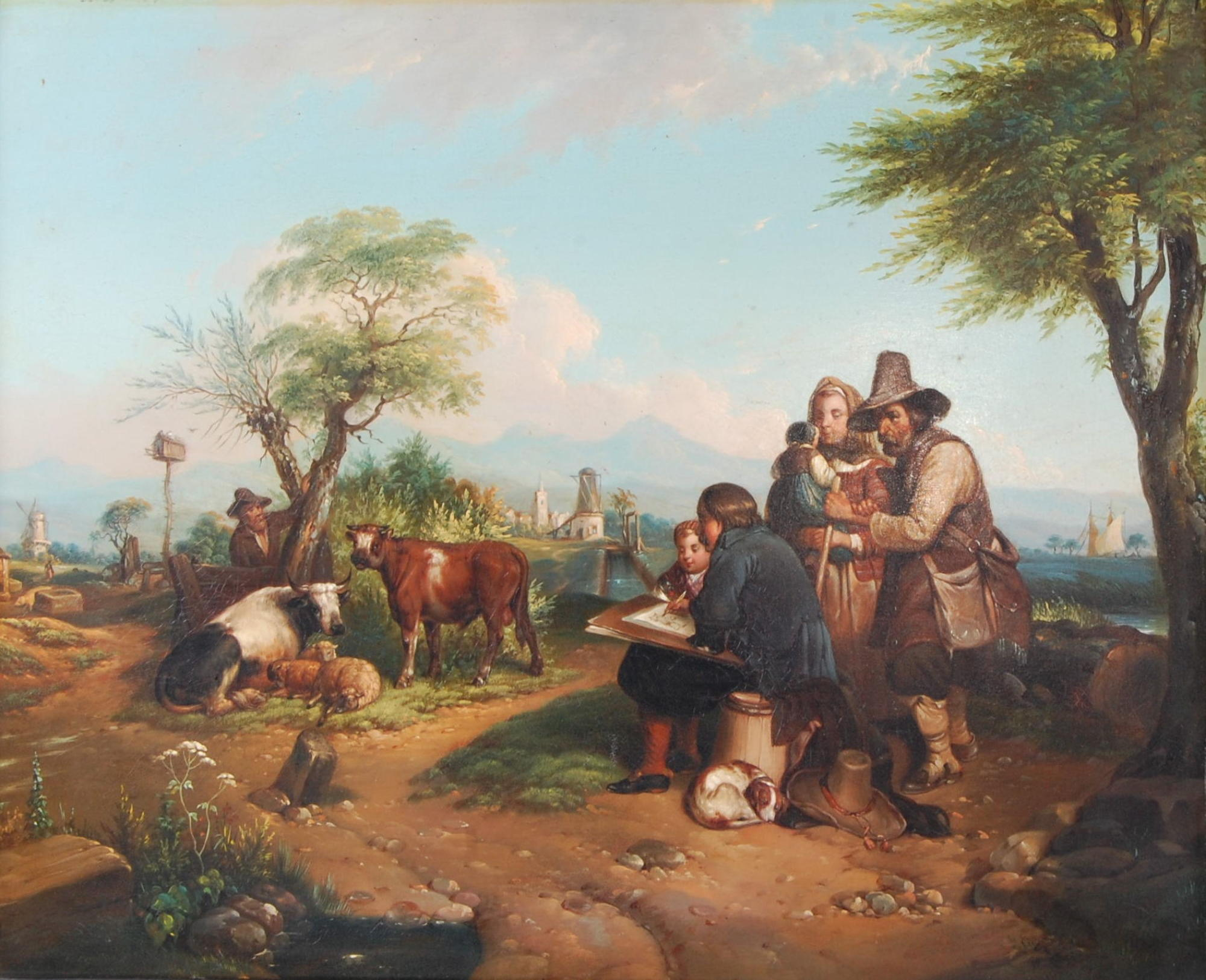
Paul Potter Painting The Young Bull, 1843.

In 1843, he was made a knight of the Legion of Honor. In 1845, he was made a Knight of the Order of Leopold. In 1849, he was appointed Peintre de la Marine for the French Ministry of Defence.

Lepoittevin was active in the artistic life of Paris. He was among 28 artists, including Corot, Delacroix, and Rousseau, who petitioned for the construction of a gallery specifically to exhibit French art at the 1851 Great Exhibition in London; the project was not successful. In 1860, Lepoittevin was a founding member of the fashionable and influential club of Parisian artists, writers, architects, and musicians, Le Cercle de L’Union Artistique.

Two years after his death, the contents of his studio were sold at auction; these included 144 paintings and finished sketches and 52 drawings and watercolors by Leppoittevin, 20 paintings by friends, as well as his paints and painting utensils, and altogether realized around 40,000 francs.

== In museums ==
In France, the Musée des Pêcheries in Fécamp has built a collection of the artist's works depicting the environs of Étretat, and in 2020 mounted the exhibition L'invention d'Étretat: Eugène Le Poittevin, un peintre et ses amis à l'aube de l'impressionnisme.

The Musée maritime de l'île Tatihou in Saint-Vaast-la-Hougue holds three paintings by Lepoittevin; a fourth, Vue de Normandie (1833), was destroyed in a fire in 2017.

The Musée des Beaux-Arts in Rouen holds a significant collection of drawings and sketches by Lepoittevin, and also the paintings Sancho et son âne (c.1847) and Les amis de la ferme (1852).

The Louvre in Paris holds the undated painting Famille de paysans au bord de l'eau.

The Maison de Balzac in Paris owns a colored set of the album Les Diables de lithographies.

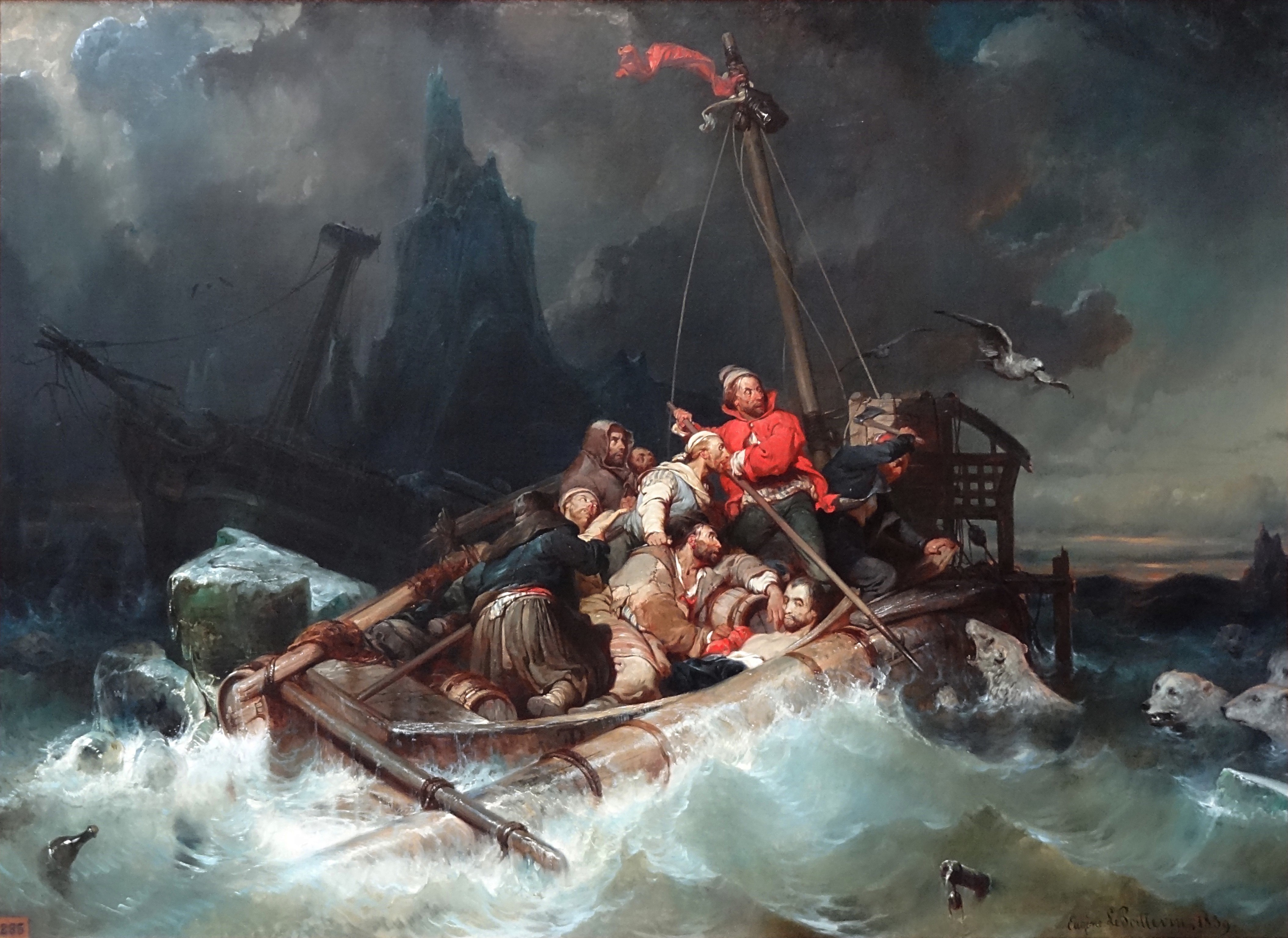
Les naufragés, 1839, Musée de Picardie, Amiens

Elsewhere in France (listed alphabetically by city), Lepoittevin's works are in the collections of the Musée de Picardie in Amiens; the Musée des Beaux-Arts d'Angers; the Musée Sarret de Grozon in Arbois; the Musée Calvet in Avignon; the Musée départemental de l'Oise in Beauvais; the Musée des Beaux-Arts de Brest; the Musée des Beaux-Arts in Chambéry; the Château-Musée de Dieppe; the Musée Magnin in Dijon; the Musée départemental d'Art ancien et contemporain in Épinal; the Musée des Beaux-Arts de La Rochelle; the Musée des Beaux-Arts in Marseille; the Musée des Beaux-Arts de Mulhouse; the Musée des Beaux-Arts in Nantes; the Musée de la Faïence et des Beaux-Arts in Nevers; the Musée des Beaux-Arts d'Orléans; the Hôtel de Brienne (home to the Ministry of Defence) in Paris; the Château de Saumur; the Musée de Soissons; the Musée Massey, Tarbes; the Musée des Beaux-Arts in Troyes; the Palace of Versailles and the Musée Lambinet in Versailles; and the Musée de la Révolution française in Vizille.

In England, his works are in the collections of the British Museum and the Victoria & Albert Museum in London; the Ashmolean Museum in Oxford; the Cooper Gallery, Barnsley; the Bowes Museum, Barnard Castle; and the Simon Carter Gallery, Woodbridge, Suffolk.

In the Netherlands, his works are in the collection of the Rijksmuseum.

In Russia, his painting Susana and the Elders (c. 1865) is in the collection of the Hermitage Museum.

In the United States, Lepoittevin's posthumous collaboration with his mentor, Auguste Xavier Leprince, Interieur de l'atelier de feu Leprince (The Artist's Studio) of 1827, is in the collection of the Chazen Museum of Art at the University of Wisconsin–Madison.

== Legacy: Lepoittevin or Corot? ==
During his lifetime and for a generation after, Lepoittevin's work was compared or confused with that of Corot, and this analogy found its way into popular culture. In Eugène Labiche's comedy Edgard et sa bonne (1852), a character says, "C'est un Le Poittevin, ça vaut un Corot et c'est beaucoup moins cher!" ("It's a Le Poittevin, it's worth a Corot and it's much cheaper!") In Georges Feydeau's Dindon (1896), a character is excited to see a Corot offered for only 600 francs. "Il est signé Poittevin, mais le marchand me garantit la fauseté de la signature…Je fais enlever Poittevin et il ne reste que le Corot!" ("It's signed Poittevin, but the dealer guarantees me the signature is fake…I'll have Poittevin removed and only the Corot will remain!")

== Legacy: Étretat ==
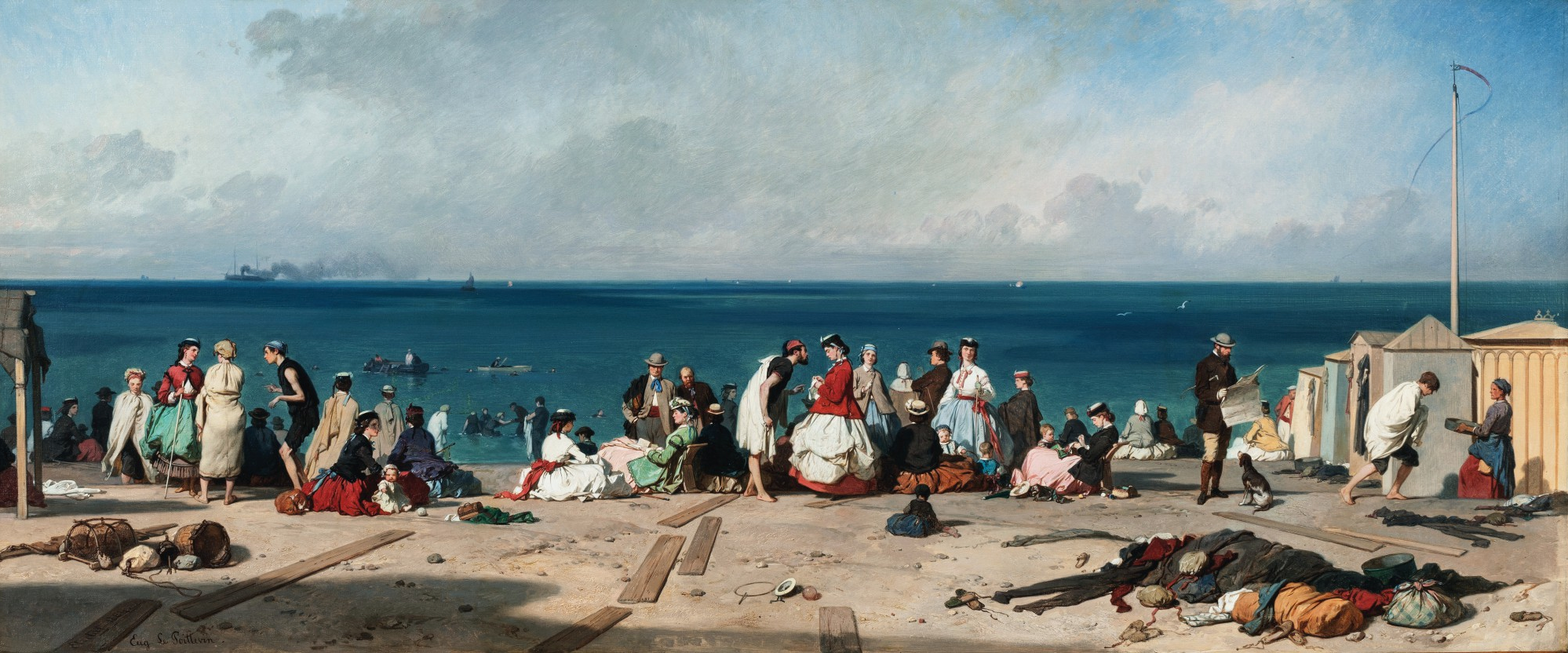
Les Bains de Mer, Plage d’Étretat (Sea Bathing, the Beach at Étretat), 1864, private collection. Figures identified in the painting include Guy de Maupassant (in blue cap at left), Charles Landelle (in red cap, center), and Bertall (reading newspaper at right). The rediscovered "lost" painting was auctioned at Sotheby's in Paris, 3 December 2020, for €226,800, a record for a work by Lepoittevin.

In recent decades, scholarly interest in Lepoittevin has centered on his works depicting the village of Étretat in Normandy, its sheer white cliffs and coastal landscape, its sailors and fishermen, and its visitors, in particular the "Parisian colony," which included Lepoittevin himself. While later artists such as Courbet and Monet and writers including Guy de Maupassant and Alphonse Karr would make Étretat famous and fashionable, it was Lepoittevin and his colleague Eugène Isabey who "discovered" the place, and Lepoittevin who "invented" Étretat. So wrote Alexandre Dumas: "Le Poittevin a inventé Étretat."

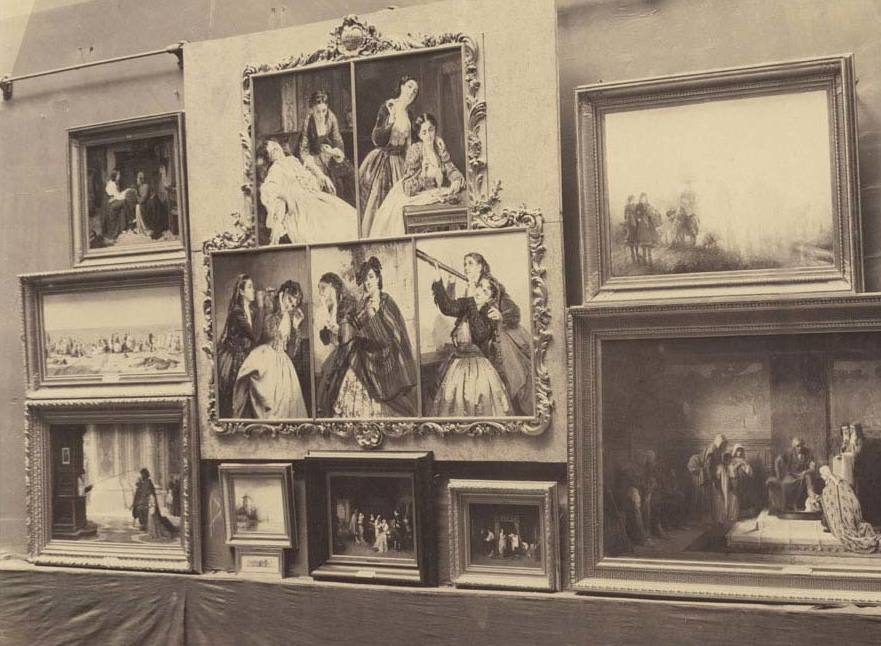
Les Bains de Mer, Plage d’Étretat displayed at the Paris Salon of 1865 (center left)

Interest has been drawn to two particular paintings depicting the beach and its summer visitors, Les Bains de Mer, Plage d’Étretat of 1864 and Bains de mer à Étretat of 1866. In 1967, Raymond Lindon (mayor of Étretat from 1929 to 1959) published a seminal article on the two paintings. After examining preliminary sketches and period photographs, and studying the artist's family and social circle, Lindon identified many of the figures, including the painter Charles Landelle, the illustrator and caricaturist Bertall, a gangling Guy de Maupassant, and Lepoittevin himself.

Ensuing studies of the artistic fascination of Étretat included chapters on Lepoittevin, and the artist became the primary focus of the exhibition L'invention d'Étretat: Eugène Le Poittevin, un peintre et ses amis à l'aube de l'impressionnisme at the Musée des Pêcheries in Fécamp, from 14 July to 15 November 2020. Despite the circumstances of the COVID-19 pandemic, the exhibition had 22,000 visitors.

The companion book of the same title included articles about Lepoittevin by various scholars, including the first substantial biographical essay.

Another essay in the book, "Les Bains de Mer, Plage d’Étretat: Enquête sur un tableau disparu" (the case of the lost painting), recounted the disappearance of this work after the fall of Napoleon III, who purchased it for 7000 francs after it was shown at the Paris Salon of 1865. (Lindon in 1967 based his research on a lithograph of the painting.) The Parisian art world took notice when the "lost" painting suddenly reappeared and was put up for auction less than a month after the exhibit closed. The sale price far exceeded Sotheby's estimate and set a record for a work by Lepoittevin, €226,800. Nadège Sébille, author of the "lost painting" chapter and attachée de conservation at the Musée des Pêcheries, tweeted: "Bon…il semblerait que ma publication sur ce tableau de Le Poittevin, dont le prix s'est envolé, a porté ses fruits pour remettre ce grand artiste à l'honneur…mais quel dommage pour le @museedefecamp!!!" ("Well…it seems that my article on this painting by Le Poittevin, whose price has soared, has borne fruit in putting this great artist in the spotlight..but what a pity for the Fécamp museum!")

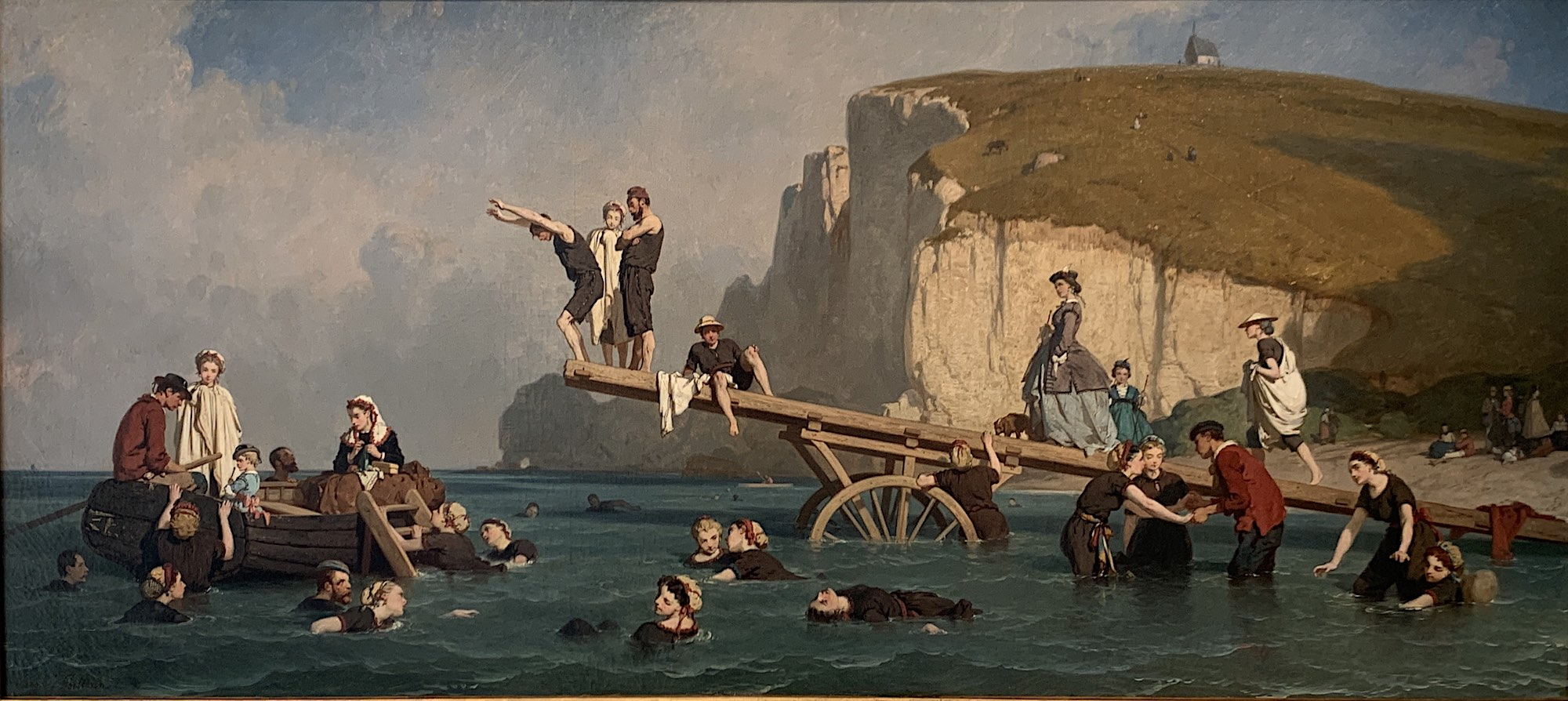
Bains de mer à Étretat (Sea Bathing at Étretat), 1866, Musée des beaux-arts de Troyes. The young man about to dive has been identified as Guy de Maupassant; the head at left is thought to be a self-portrait.

== Gallery: portraits of Lepoittevin & memorabilia ==
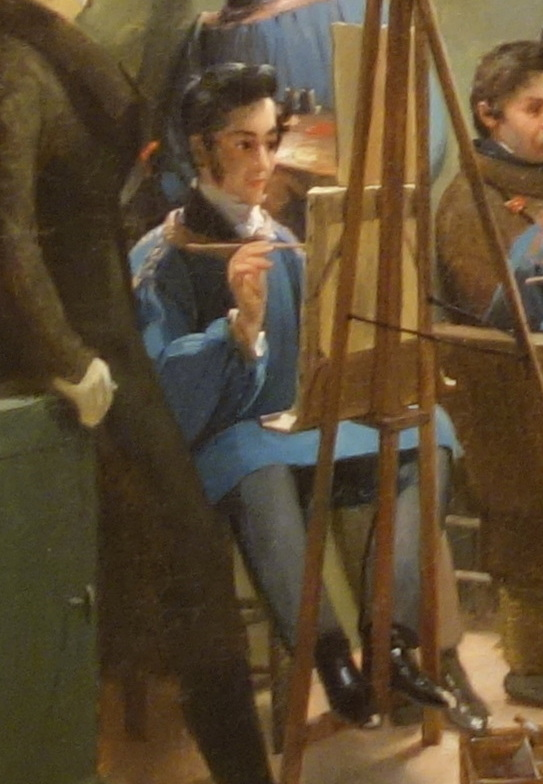
Leprince and Lepoittevin, The Artist's Studio (detail: presumed self-portrait of Lepoittevin), 1827, Chazen Museum of Art, Madison

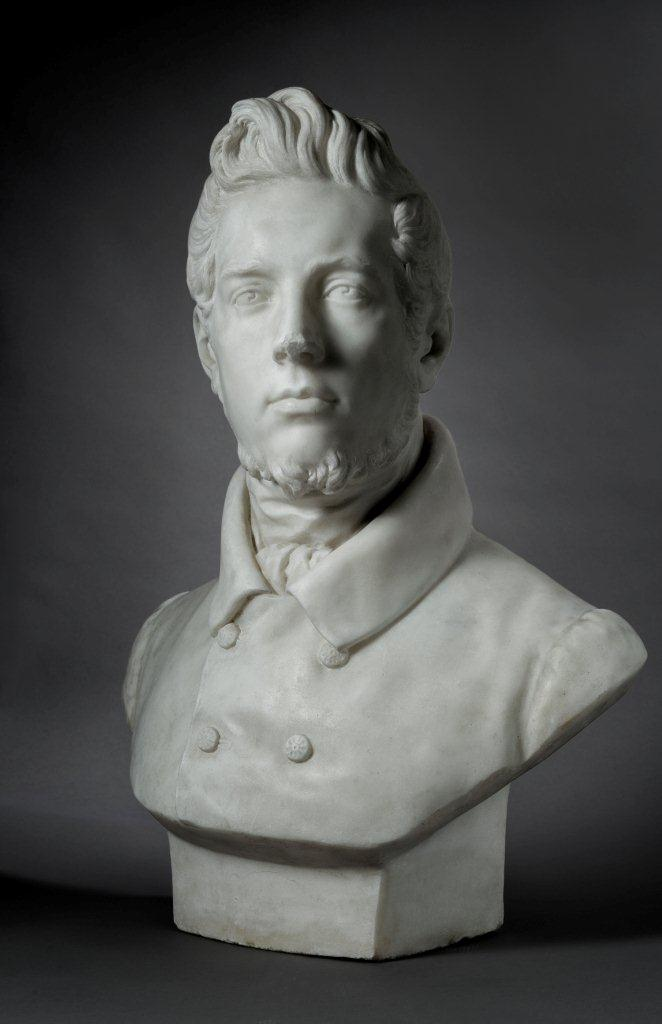
Guillaume Geefs, marble bust of Eugène Lepoittevin, 1835

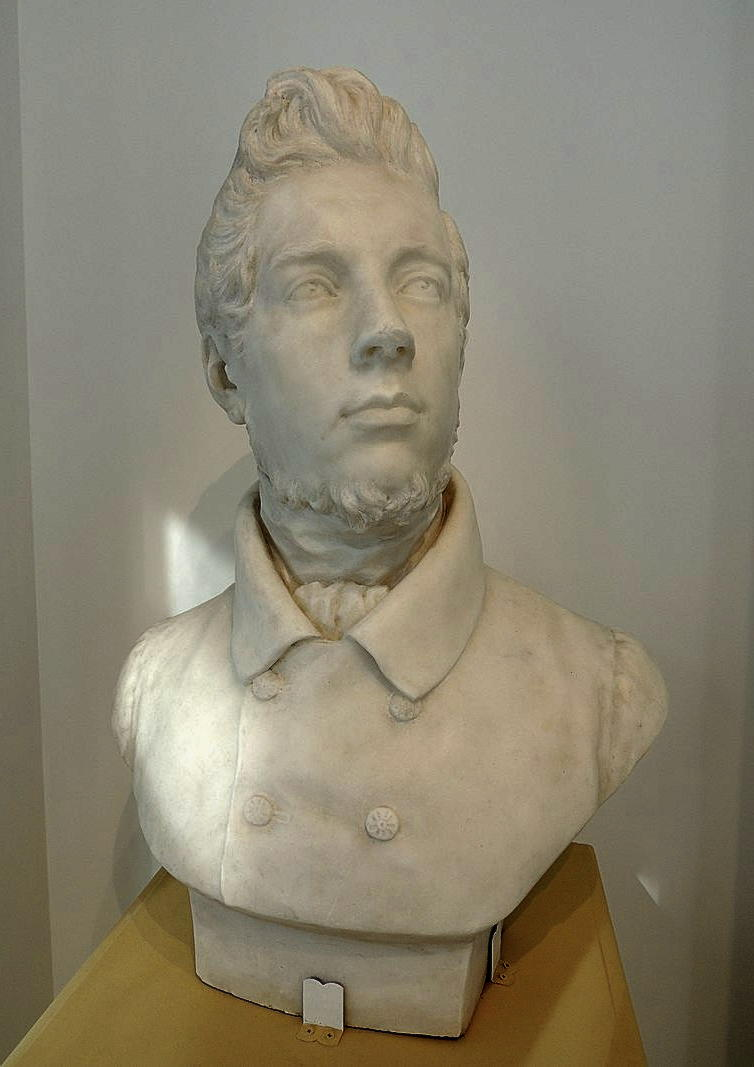
Guillaume Geefs, marble bust of Eugène Lepoittevin, 1835

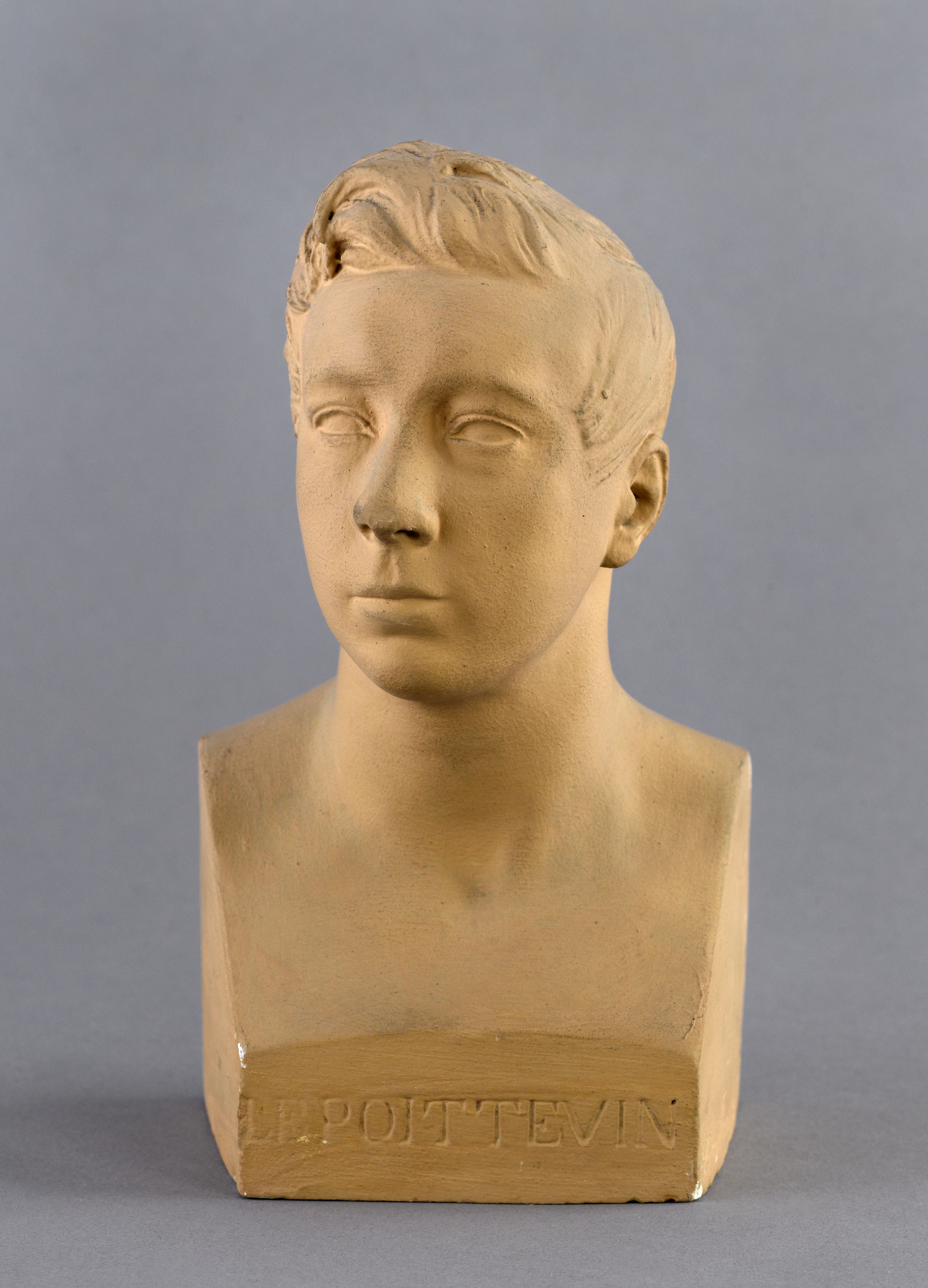
Jean-Pierre Dantan, terra cotta bust of Eugéne Lepoittevin, 1835, Musée Carnavalet, Paris

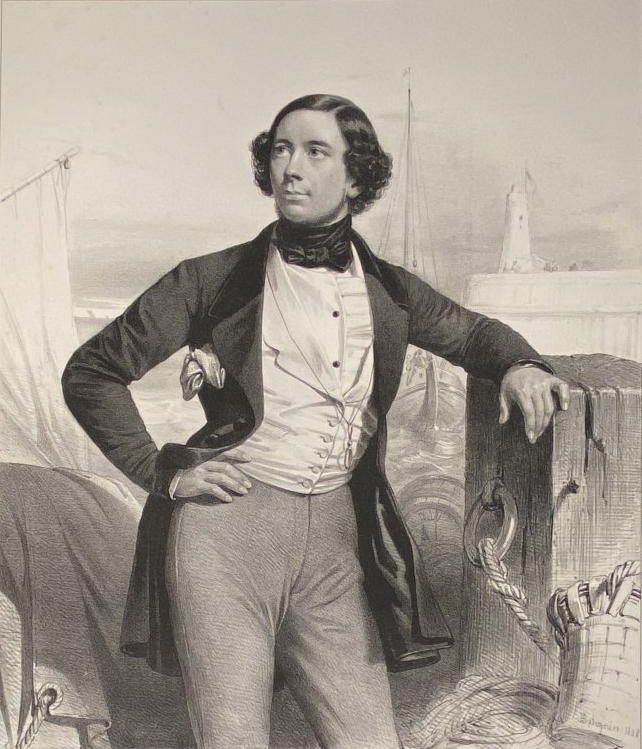
Charles Baugniet, portrait of Eugène Lepoittevin, 1838

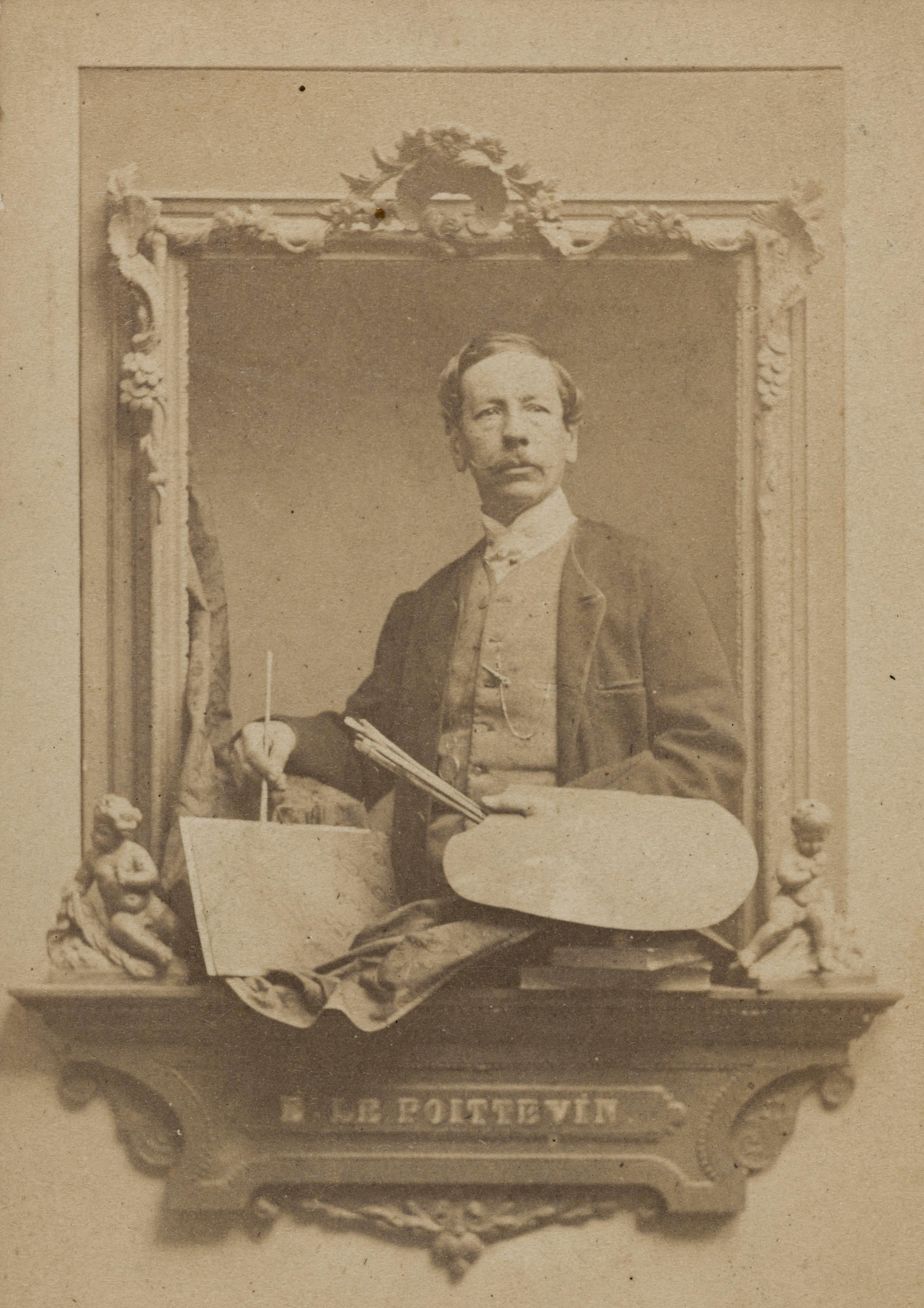
Adolphe Dallemagne, portrait of Eugene Lepoittevin, between 1860 and 1870, Musée Carnavalet, Paris

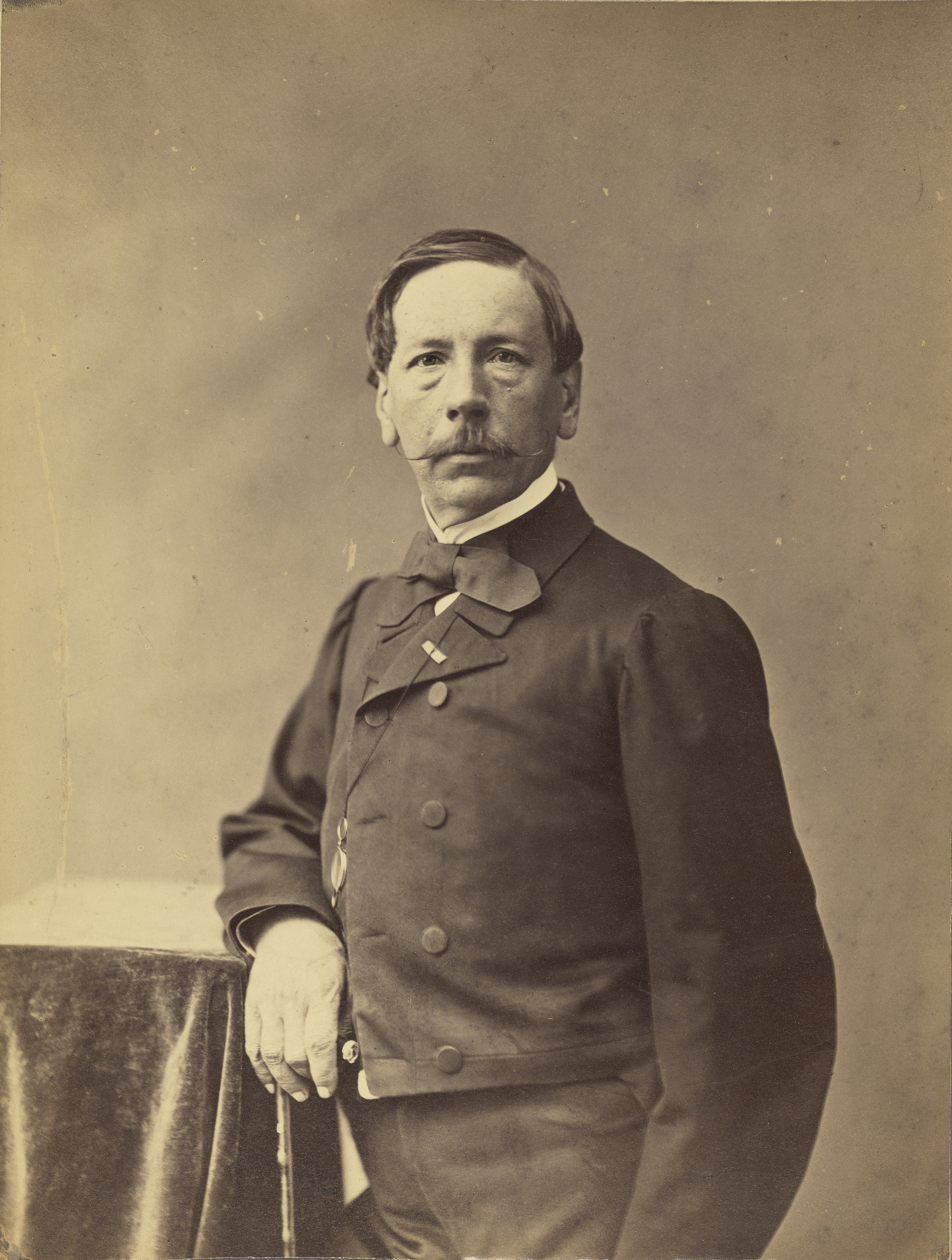
Nadar, portrait of Eugène Lepoittevin, c. 1861–1869

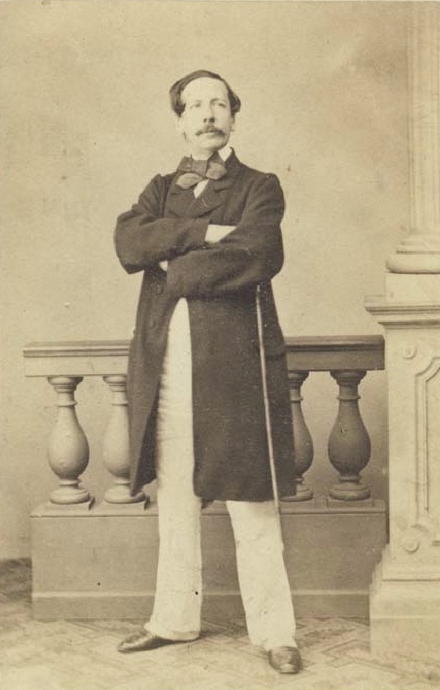
Pierre-Ambroise Richebourg, portrait of Eugène Lepoittevin, date unknown

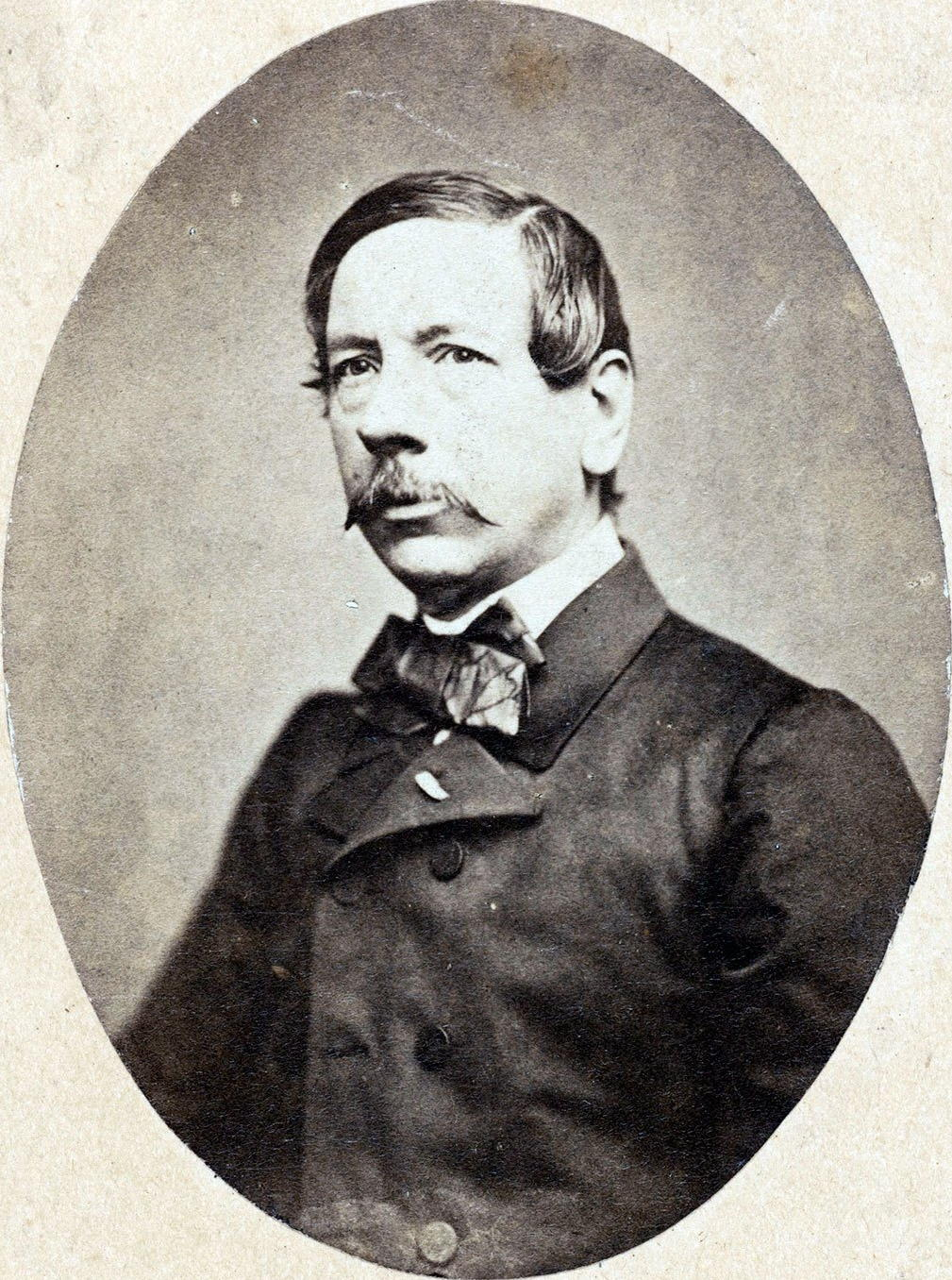
Portrait of Eugène Lepoittevin, photographer and date unknown

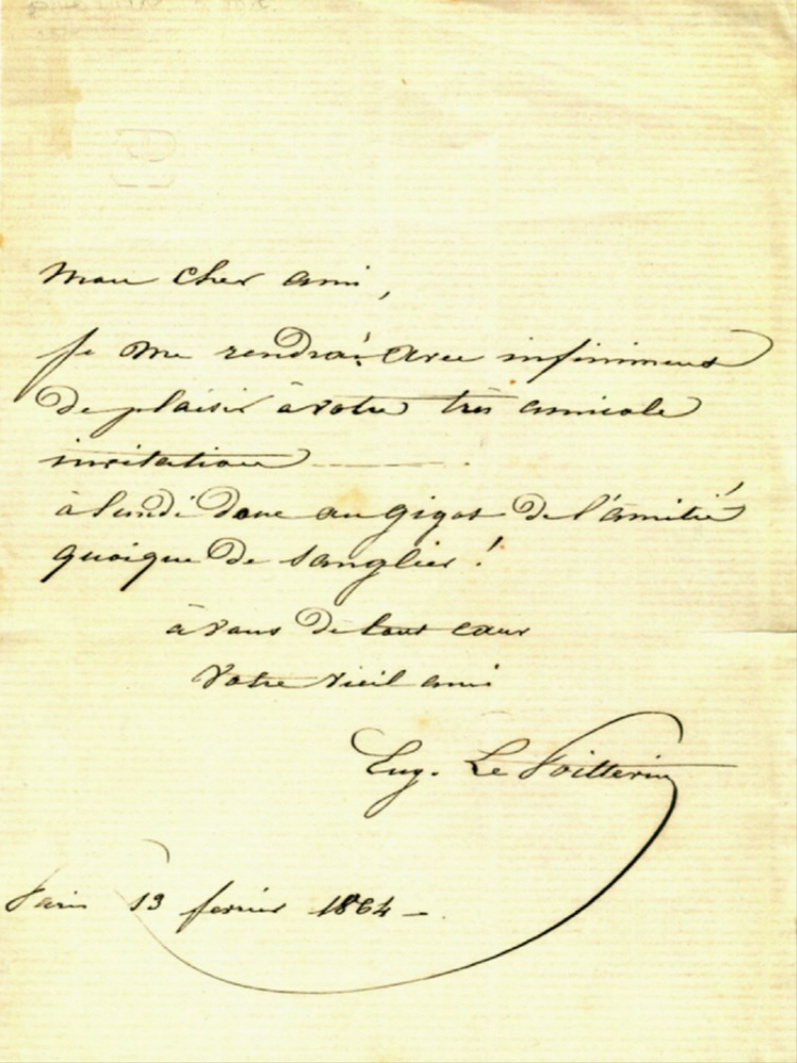
Eugène Lepoittevin, letter of 13 February 1864

== Bibliography: lithographic albums by Lepoittevin ==
- Lepoittevin, Eugène (1830a). Souvenirs patriotiques, album of lithographs. Paris: Scheffer père, 1830.
- Lepoittevin, Eugène (1830b). Charges et Décharges diaboliques, album of lithographs. Paris: Guerrier, 1830. Kinsey Institute Library: 710 L593c.
- Lepoittevin, Eugène (c. 1830). Ombres Fantastiques, lithography by H. Nicolet, Paris: chez Aumont, and London: Charles Tilt, c. 1830.
- Lepoittevin, Eugène (1832a). Diableries, album of lithographs. Paris: 1832.
- Lepoittevin, Eugène (1832b) Les Diables de Lithographies, Paris: chez Aumont, and London: Charles Tilt, 1832.
- Lepoittevin, Eugène (1832-1840). Paysages maritimes, album of lithographs. Paris: Aubert & Cie, 1832–1840.

== Bibliography ==
- Bellangé, Eugène (1872). "Le Poittevin (Eugène), peintre de marine et de genre" in Catalogue des tableaux, études terminées, esquisses, dessins et croquis de Feu Eugène Le Poittevin […] qui composaient son atelier, Paris: 1872.
- Desjardins, Marie-Hélène (2004). Des peintres au pays des falaises, Éditions des falaises, 2004.
- Delarue, Bruno (2005). Les Peintres a Étretat 1786-1940, Yport: B. Delarue, 2005.
- Lindon, Raymond (1967). "Eugène Le Poittevin et ses bains de mer" in La Gazette des Beaux-Arts, Dec. 1967, page 349–357.
- Sébille, Nadège (2020d). "Bains de mer à Étretat" in L'invention d'Étretat: Eugène Le Poittevin, un peintre et ses amis à l'aube de l'impressionnisme, Fécamp: éditions des Falaises, 2020, pp. 116–123.
- Sébille, Nadège (2020a). "Biographie d’Eugène Le Poittevin" in L'invention d'Étretat: Eugène Le Poittevin, un peintre et ses amis à l'aube de l'impressionnisme, Fécamp: éditions des Falaises, 2020, pp. 28–43.
- Sébille, Nadège (2020b). "Les Bains de Mer, Plage d’Étretat: Enquête sur un tableau disparu" in L'invention d'Étretat: Eugène Le Poittevin, un peintre et ses amis à l'aube de l'impressionnisme, Fécamp: éditions des Falaises, 2020, pp. 84–89, 110–111.
- Sébille, Nadège (2020c). "Portraits et aeteliers" in L'invention d'Étretat: Eugène Le Poittevin, un peintre et ses amis à l'aube de l'impressionnisme, Fécamp: éditions des Falaises, 2020, pp. 92–97.
