= Raymond Lindon =

Mayor of Étretat
- In office May 1929 – March 1959

First Advocate General at the Court of Cassation

Personal details
- Born: 26 December 1901 Paris, France
- Died: January 25, 1992 (aged 90) Boulogne-Billancourt, Hauts-de-Seine, France
- Party: Radical-socialiste
- Spouse: Thérèse Baur (m. 1924)
- Relations: Vincent Lindon (grandson)
- Parent(s): Alfred Lindon; Fernande Citroën
- Occupation: Magistrate; writer
- Awards: Commander of the Legion of Honour

Raymond Lindon (26 December 1901 – 25 January 1992) was a French magistrat, First Advocate General at the Court of Cassation and mayor of the French town of Etretat from May 1929 to March 1959. He was the son of Alfred Lindon and Fernande Citroën, André Citroën's sister.

He was a Commander of the Legion of Honour.

Lindon, who, under the pen name of Valère Catogan, itself an anagram of avocat général, wrote the short story, Le Secret des rois de France ou la véritable identité d'Arsène Lupin, where it is shown that Maurice Leblanc's creation is the true heir to the French throne. Lindon's book was published in 1955 by les Éditions de Minuit, his son Jérome's publishing house.

Among his other works was the article "Eugène Le Poittevin et ses bains de mer" in La Gazette des Beaux-Arts, December 1967, about the artist whose paintings captured the Parisian social circle that flocked to the beach of Etretat in the 1860s.

One of Raymond Lindon's grandchildren is acclaimed French actor, Vincent Lindon.
