= Charles Desmarets =

15th century French soldier

Charles Desmarets, was a French knight. He was a son of Antoine des Marets.

In 1435, Desmarets captured Dieppe from the English garrison and set about expanding and improving the castle.

An English army led by John Talbot, Earl of Shrewsbury besieged Dieppe between 2 November 1442 until 14 August 1443. The Dieppe garrison was led by Desmarets. The English siege was broken by a relief army led by the Dauphin Louis.

== Marriage and issue ==
He married Marie des Essarts, dame de Lignières, they had the following known issue:

- Philippe des Marets, Seigneur de Saint-Aubin-en-Caux
- Jehanne des Marets
- Christophe des Marets
- Louise des Marets
- Marie des Marets
