= Siege of Dieppe =

- Part of the Hundred Years' War
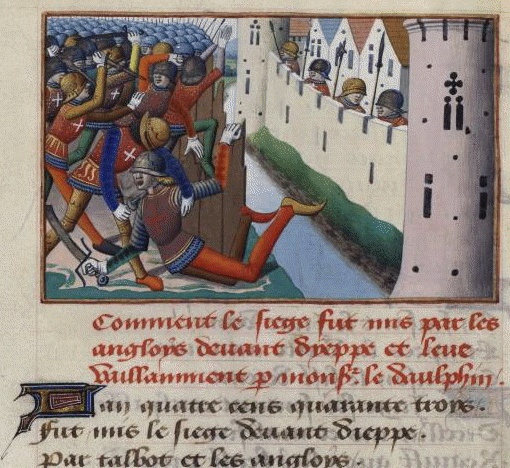
Date	2 November 1442 – 14 August 1443 (9 months, 1 week and 5 days)
Location	Dieppe, Normandy, France 49.92°N 1.08°E
Result	French victory

Belligerents
France	England

Commanders and leaders
Dauphin Louis; Charles Desmarets; Antoine de Chabannes	John Talbot, Earl of Shrewsbury; William Peyto (POW)

Strength
Garrison: Hundreds of men-at-arms Relief army: 1,600 men	600 men 200 artillery pieces

Casualties and losses
100 killed Hundreds wounded	300 killed 14 executed Artillery pieces captured

The siege of Dieppe (2 November 1442 – 14 August 1443) took place during the Hundred Years War where English forces led by John Talbot, Earl of Shrewsbury besieged and failed to capture the French-held port of Dieppe in Normandy.

== Prelude ==
The English commander John Talbot, Earl of Shrewsbury marched out with a core troop of 600 men from his headquarters in Jumièges, Normandy at the end of October 1442 to besiege the French-held port of Dieppe. The French garrison of the castle of Charlemesnil surrendered to Talbot's army.

== Siege ==
Talbot built a wooden fort on the heights of Le Pollet east of Dieppe and installed a garrison of 500 men under Sir William Peyto along with 200 artillery pieces of various make and began to bombard Dieppe's fortifications and houses with them.

On 12 August 1443 a French relief army of 1,600 men under the dauphin Louis arrived at Dieppe, which was garrisoned by several hundred men-at-arms led by Charles Desmarets. Two more French armies had reinforced the town previously. At 8 am on 14 August, the French attacked the English fort to the sound of trumpets. The French had five or six wooden bridges on wheels and cranes that hoisted the bridges into position over the English walls. The attacking French troops were repulsed by English missile and arrow fire and lost 100 killed and hundreds wounded.

The citizens of Dieppe reinforced the French army with between 60 and 80 large crossbows and the dauphin ordered the attack renewed. The English were defeated, with 300 killed and 14 French-speaking survivors hanged as traitors on the dauphin's orders. Sir William Peyto, Sir John Ripley and Henry Talbot were captured, among others. The fort was dismantled on the dauphin's orders and the artillery carried off to Dieppe's arsenal.
