= Siege of Creil =

- Part of the Hundred Years' War
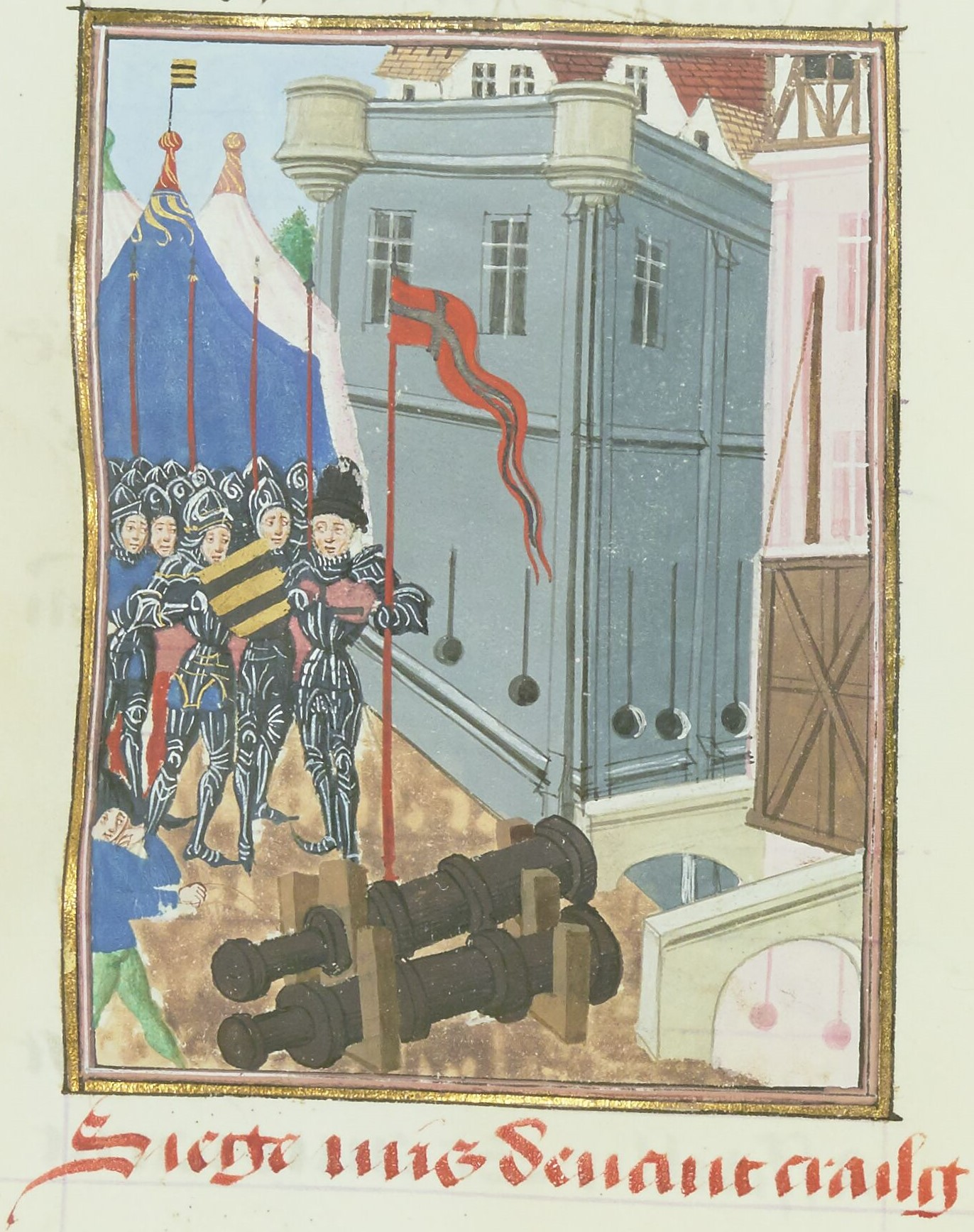
- Miniature of the Siege of Creil by Philippe de Mazerolles, from La Cronicque du temps de Tres Chrestien Roy Charles, septisme de ce nom, roy de France by Jean Chartier, c. 1470–1479
Date	8–25 May 1441 (2 weeks and 3 days)
Location	Creil, Picardy, France 49.2583°N 2.4833°E
Result	French victory

Belligerents
France	England

Commanders and leaders
Charles VII of France; Jean Bureau	William Peyto

The siege of Creil (8–25 May 1441) took place during the Hundred Years War. French forces led by King Charles VII of France besieged and captured the English-held town and castle north of Paris.

== Prelude ==
For the campaign of 1441, King Charles VII of France assembled a large army led by himself in person and accompanied by a powerful train of heavy artillery led by Jean Bureau.

== Siege ==
The town and castle of Creil was besieged on 8 May. In two weeks the French artillery breached the walls. The garrison, led in person by its commander Sir William Peyto, sallied out on 24 May but were beaten. They surrendered the place the next day and went off to Normandy.
