= William Peyto (died 1464) =

15th-century English knight

William Peyto (circa 1394 – 24 November 1464), Lord of Chesterton, was an English knight from Warwickshire.

== Life ==
Peyto was the son of William de Peyto and Joan Thornbury. He was the Sheriff of Warwickshire and Leicestershire between Michaelmas 1428 and 10 February 1430, and again between 8 November 1436 and 7 November 1437. Peyto was the garrison commander of the town and castle of Creil in France, that was besieged on 8 May 1441, by a French army led by King Charles VII of France. After two weeks the French artillery breached the walls. Peyto, led the garrison and sallied out on 24 May but were beaten. They surrendered the next day and where allowed safe conduct into Normandy.

Peyto was the captain of Dieppe and was captured during the siege of Dieppe in 1442–43. He was ransomed for 3,000 écus and had to mortgage his estates upon his return to England in 1445.

== Marriage and issue ==
William married firstly Elizabeth, daughter of Robert Francisof Foremark; they had no issue.

He married secondly Katherine, the widow of Thomas Stafford of Baginton, she was the daughter of John Gresley and Elizabeth Clarell, they are known to have had the following issue:

- John Peyto
