= The Wave (Courbet) =

Series of paintings by Gustave Courbet

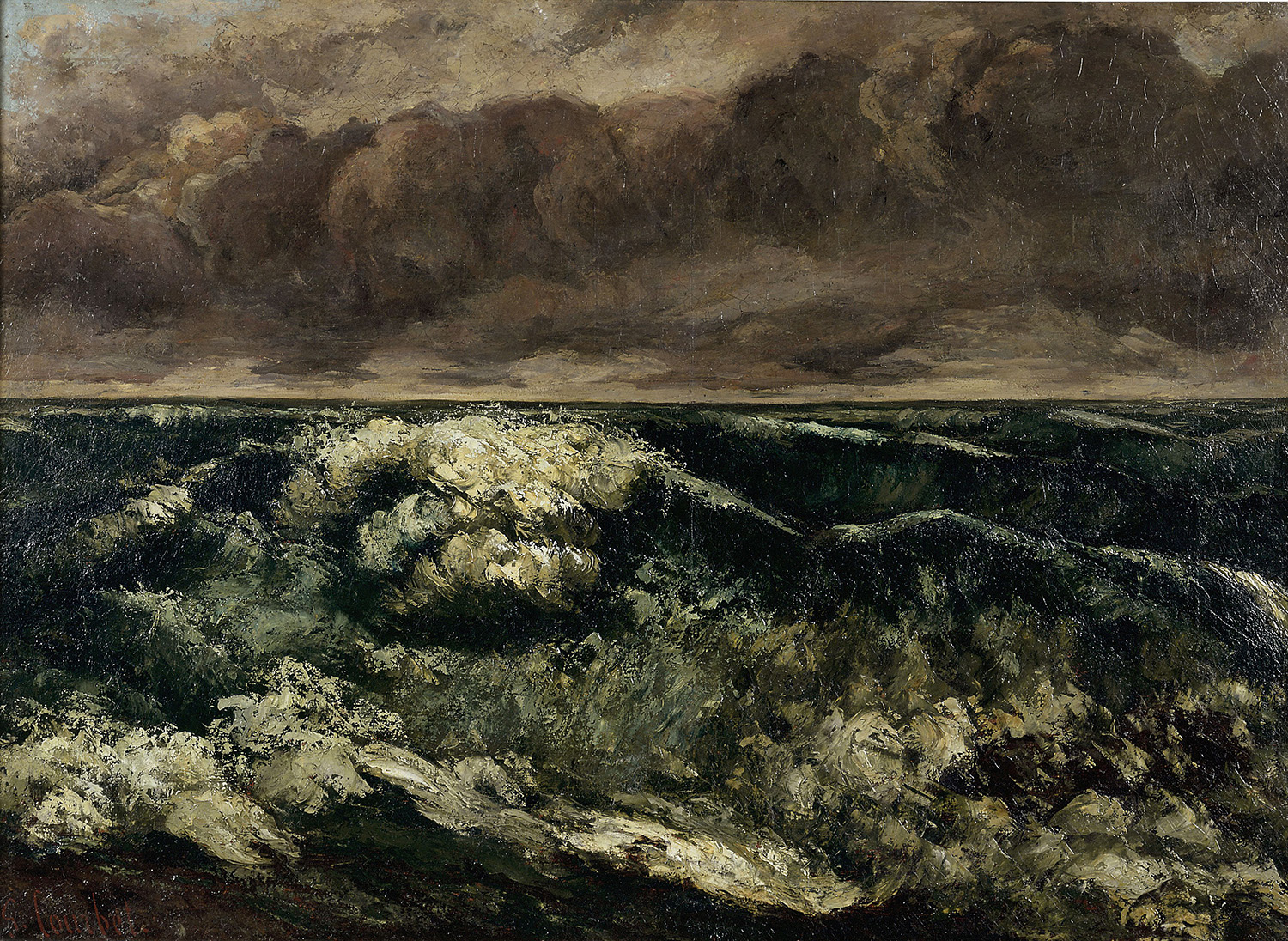
The Lyon work.

The Wave or The Waves is the title given to several seascapes painted between 1869 and 1870 by the French painter Gustave Courbet.

== Examples ==
- The Waves (1869, Philadelphia Museum of Art)
- The Stormy Sea or The Wave (1869, Musée d'Orsay)
- The Wave (1869, Musée des beaux-arts de Lyon)
- The Wave (1869, National Gallery of Scotland, Edinburgh)
- The Wave (1870, Am Römerholz, Winterthur)
- The Wave (1870, Musée des beaux-arts d'Orléans)
- The Wave (unknown date, Städelsches Kunstinstitut, Frankfurt)
- The Wave (unknown date, National Museum of Western Art, Tokyo, Japan)

== Gallery ==
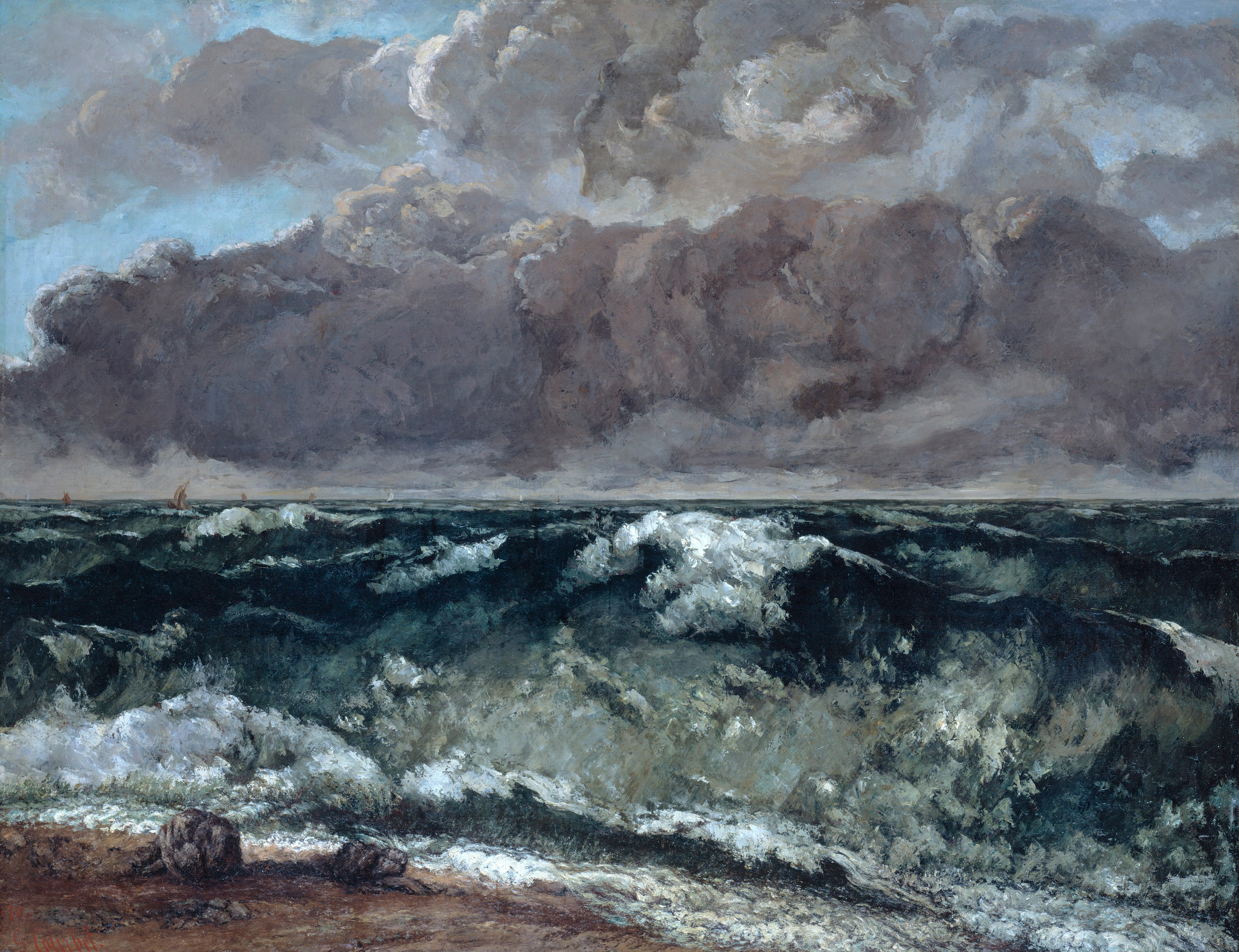
The Wave, 1869-70, Alte Nationalgalerie

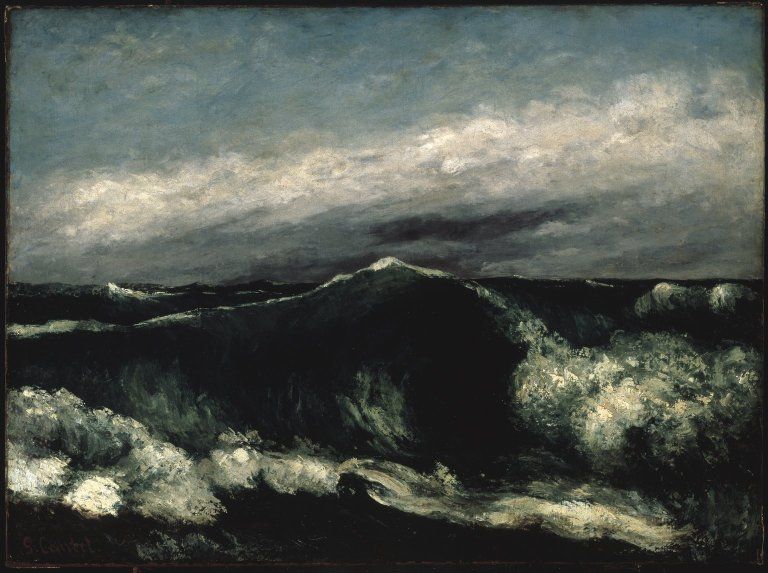
The Wave, c. 1869, Brooklyn Museum

The Wave, c. 1869, Centraal Museum

The Wave, Dallas Museum of Art

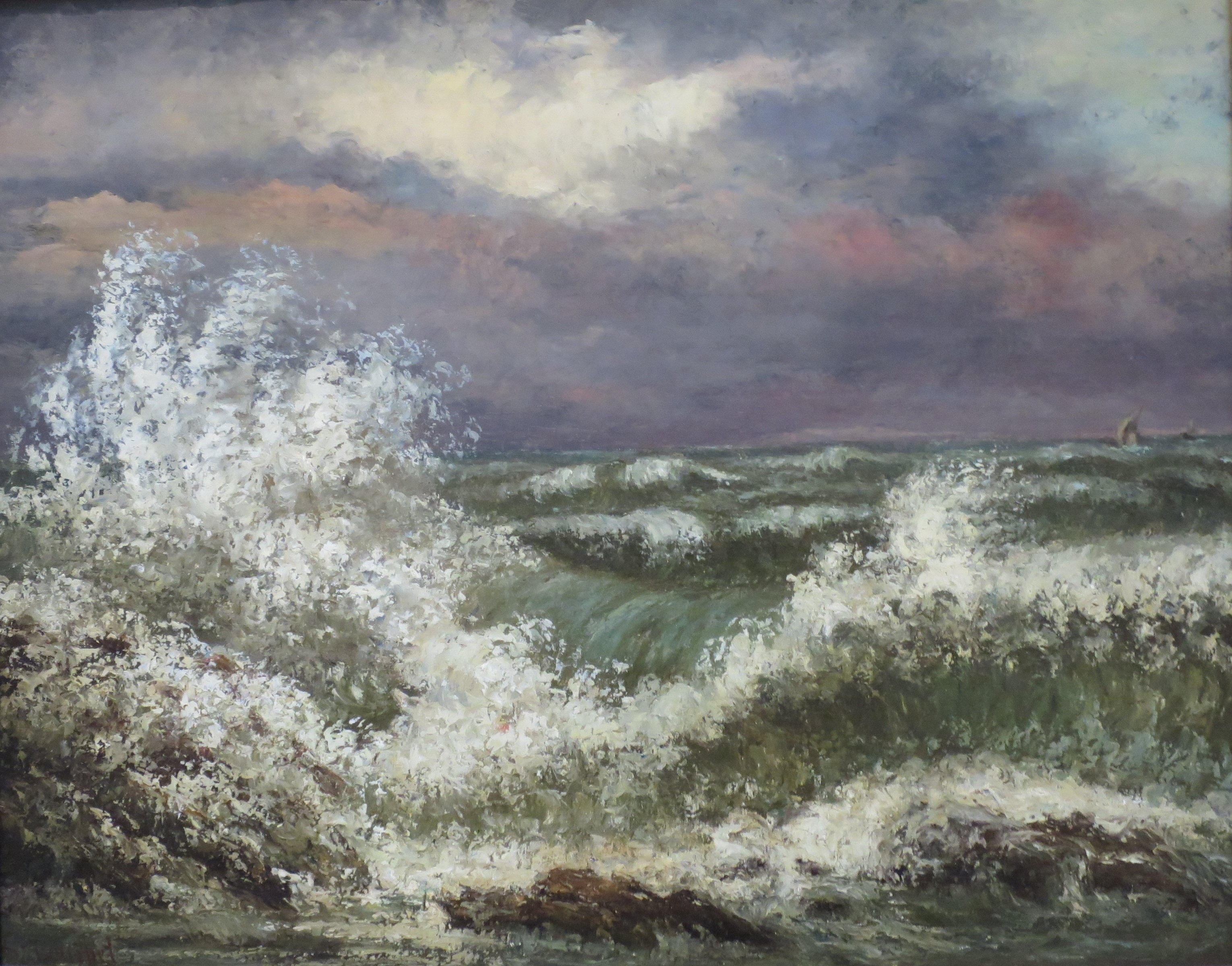
The Wave, c. 1869, Fine Arts Museums of San Francisco

A Wave Breaking under Storm Clouds, c. 1870, Karen B. Cohen Collection

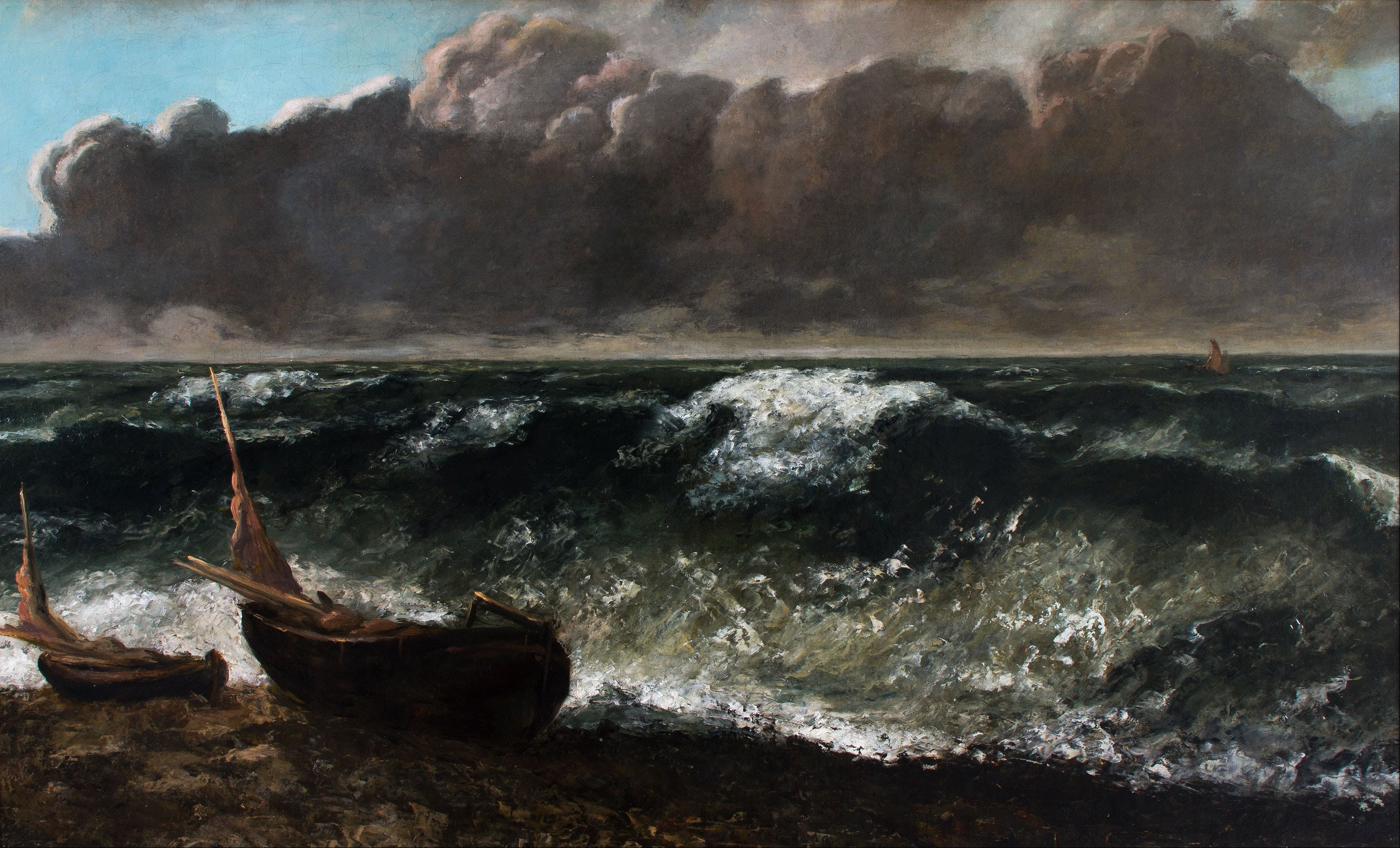
The Wave, 1869, Museum of Modern Art André Malraux - MuMa

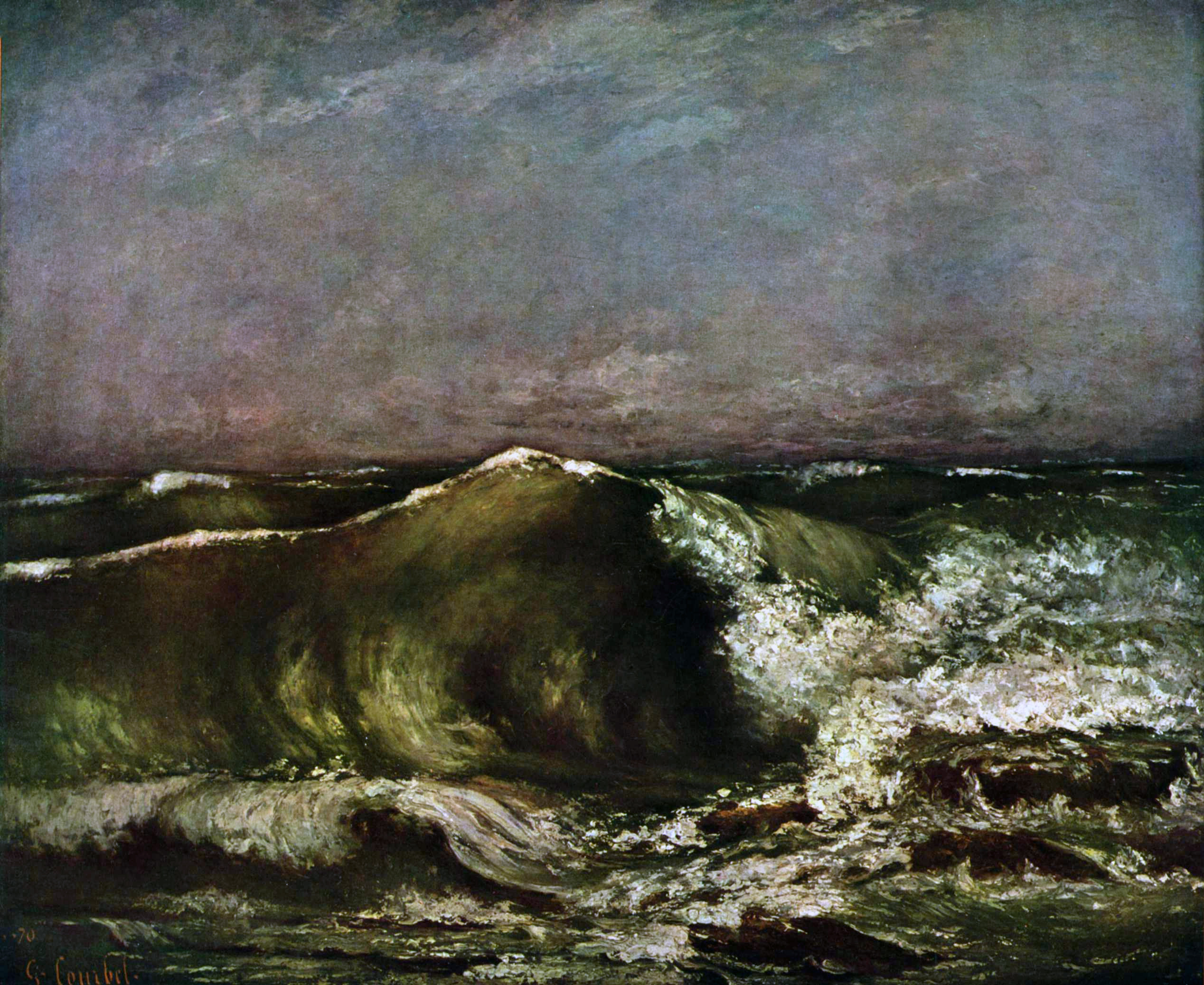
The Wave, 1870, Am Römerholz

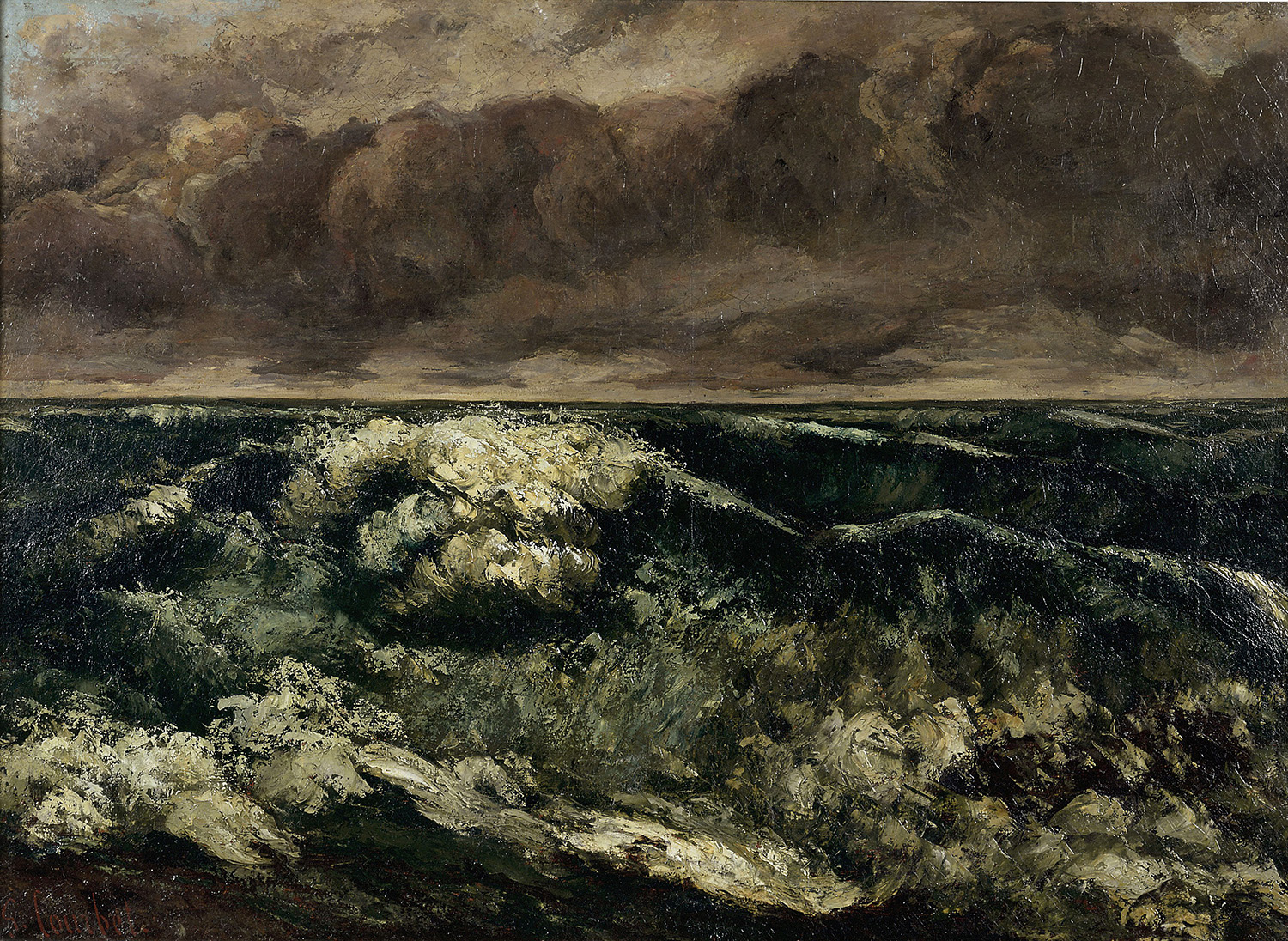
The Wave, 1869, Museum of Fine Arts of Lyon

Stormy sea, 1870, Musée d'Orsay

The Wave, 1869, Scottish National Gallery

The Wave, 1872, National Gallery of Victoria

The Wave, Museo Nacional de Bellas Artes de La Habana

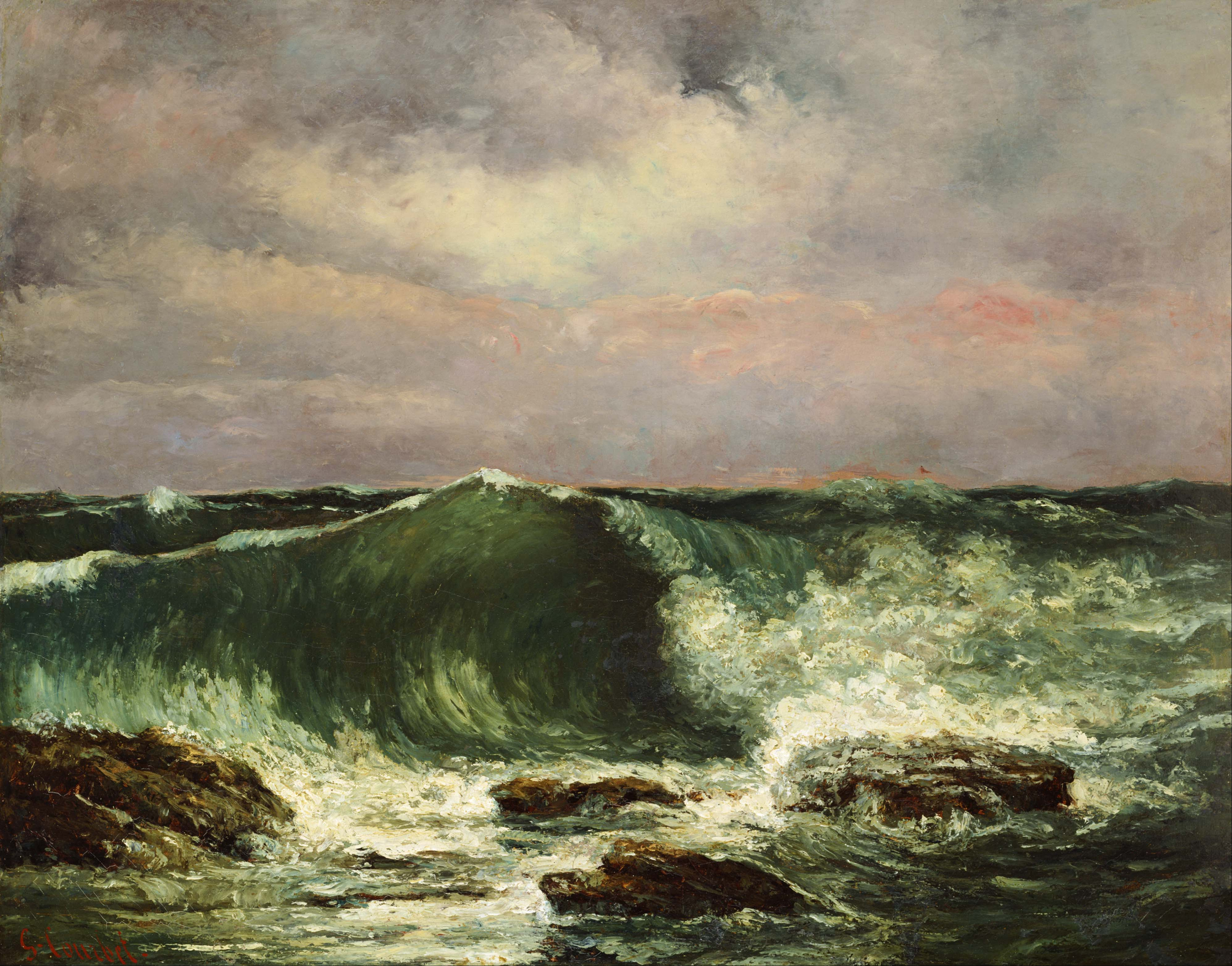
Waves, c. 1870, National Museum of Western Art

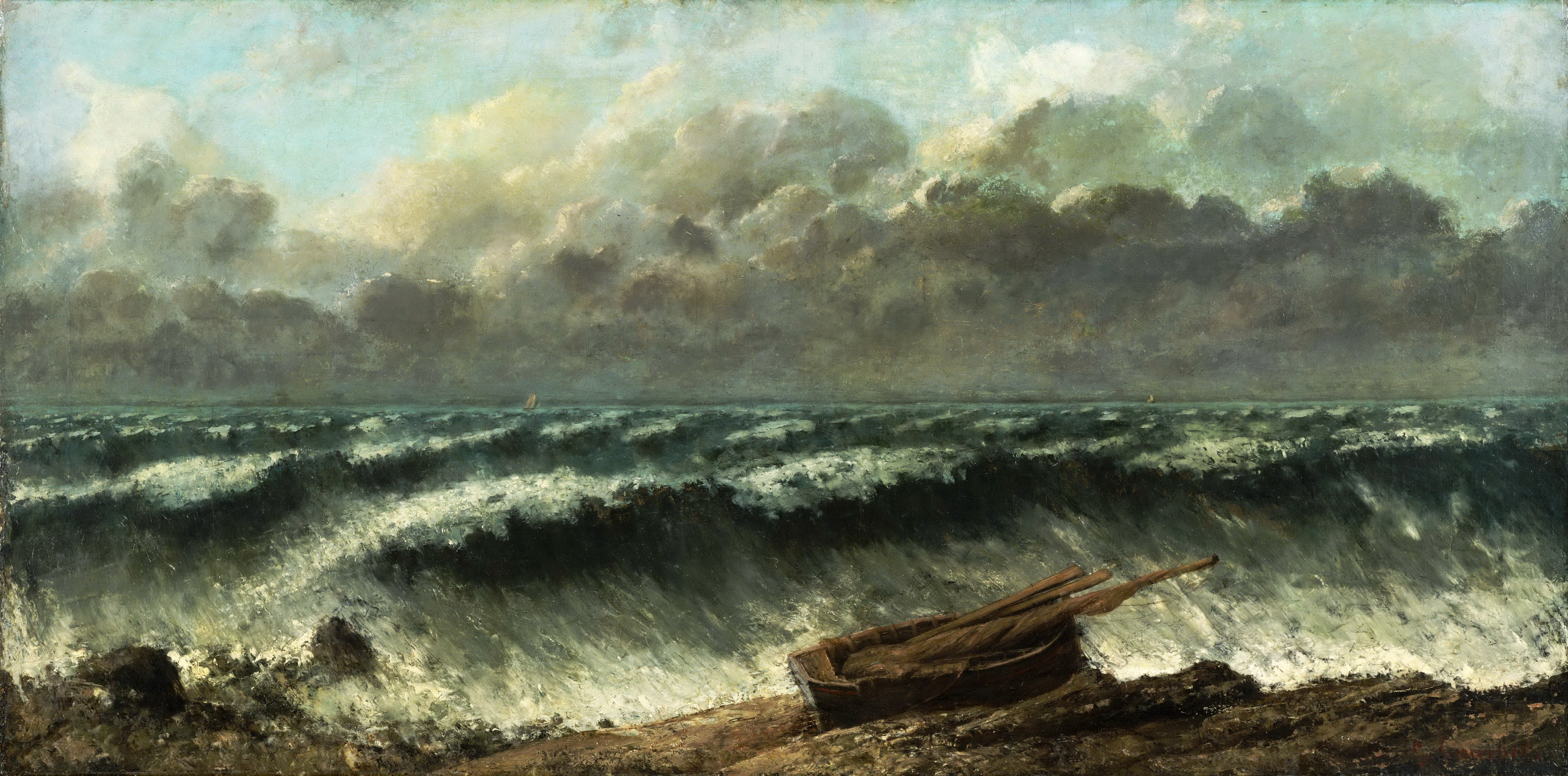
Waves, 1869, Philadelphia Museum of Art

Waves, c. 1870, Philadelphia Museum of Art

The Wave, 1869, Pushkin Museum of Fine Arts

The Wave, 1869, Shimane Art Museum

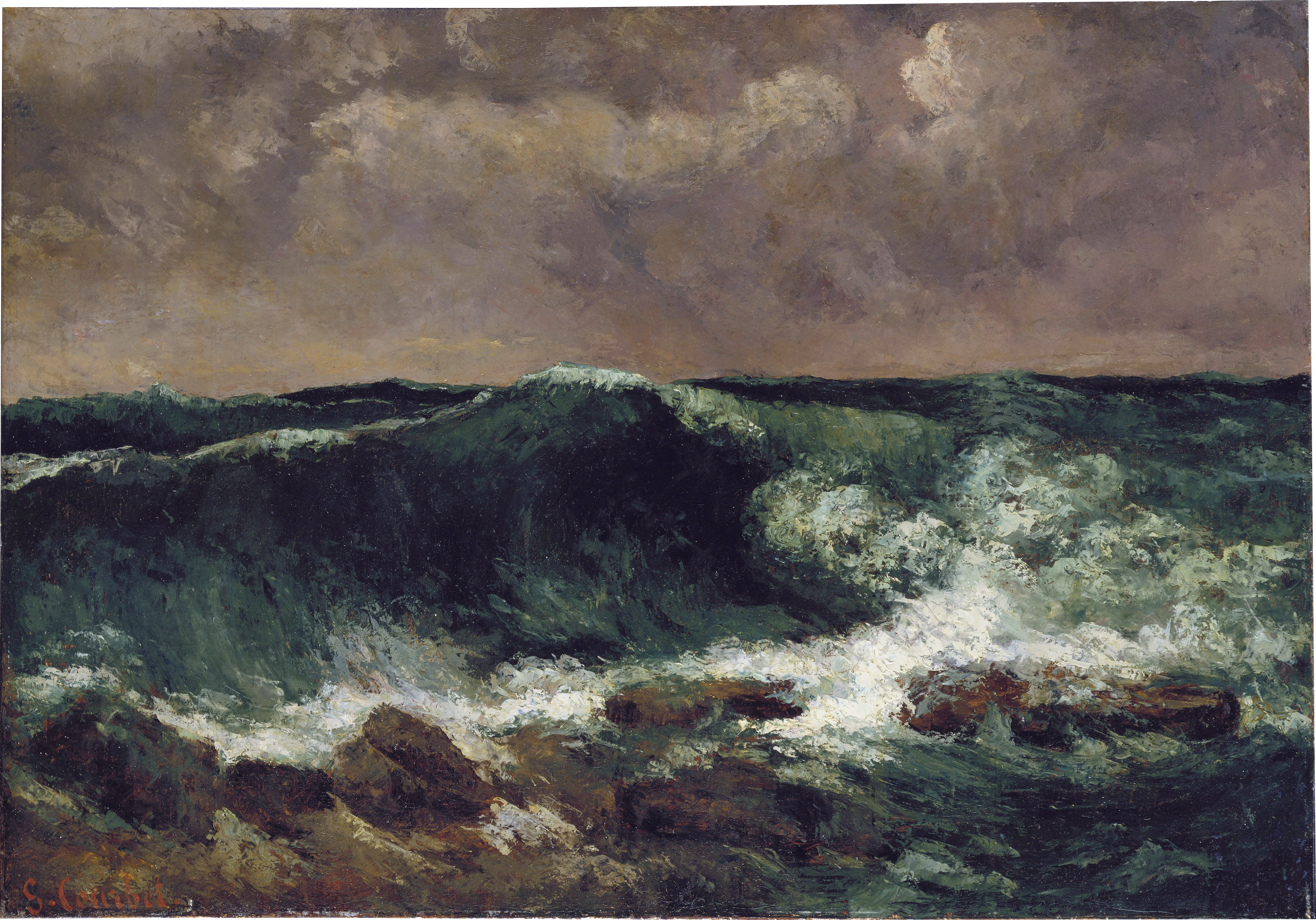
The Wave, 1869, Städel Museum
