= Charles Landelle =

French painter (1821–1908)

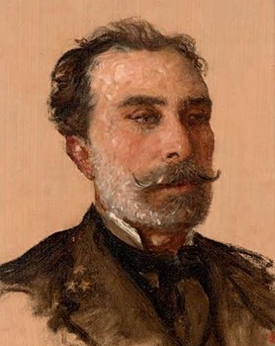
Self-portrait (1875)

Charles Zacharie Landelle (2 June 1821 – 13 October 1908) was a French painter who specialized in portraits. He is best known for his Orientalist works.

== Biography ==
He was born in Laval, where his father was employed by the préfecture. In 1827, his family moved to Paris when his father was transferred and he would not return to his hometown until near the end of his life. In 1837, at the age of sixteen, he was admitted to the École des Beaux-arts, where he studied with Paul Delaroche and Ary Scheffer. After trips to Italy and the south of France, he copied the Old Masters at the Louvre. He began by painting portraits largely as a means of supporting himself.

These were a great success and he had his first exhibit at the Salon of 1841. His works came to the attention of King Louis-Philippe and he was awarded a medal. Soon, he became an official painter and received numerous state commissions. His portrait sitters also now came from a higher level of society. In 1852, Napoleon III bought several of his works and became a great admirer. Thanks to him, Landelle was awarded the Legion of Honor in 1855.

In 1857, he married Alice Letronne (1832–1882), daughter of the archaeologist Jean-Antoine Letronne who had served as Garde Général of the Archives Nationales and helped save them during the February Revolution. They had two sons who both predeceased their father.

In 1859, he received a major commission from the Emperor to decorate the salon of the Élysée Palace. He painted six doorways with allegories of the Four Elements plus Peace and War. He was very prolific overall, producing somewhere between 2,000 and 3,000 works, counting duplicates. One painting was redone in twenty-three different versions.

After voyages to North Africa and the Middle East in 1860, he produced a number of Orientalist works. He also visited Morocco in 1866, but went as part of an official delegation rather than as a painter. In 1875, he went to Egypt and sailed the Nile with the explorer Auguste-Édouard Mariette. Every year after, he made painting trips to Algeria. He became known as the peintre des fellahs (painter of fellahs).

He later began a campaign to create an art museum in Laval, which he inaugurated in 1895, along with President Félix Faure. Today, it is known as the Musée des Sciences.

He died in Chennevières-sur-Marne in 1908, without descendants. The largest number of his works are in Laval, but may also be seen at the Louvre, the Palace of Versailles, Musée Ingres, Musée des beaux-arts de Reims, Musée de Grenoble and the Musée des beaux-arts de Rouen.

== Selected paintings ==
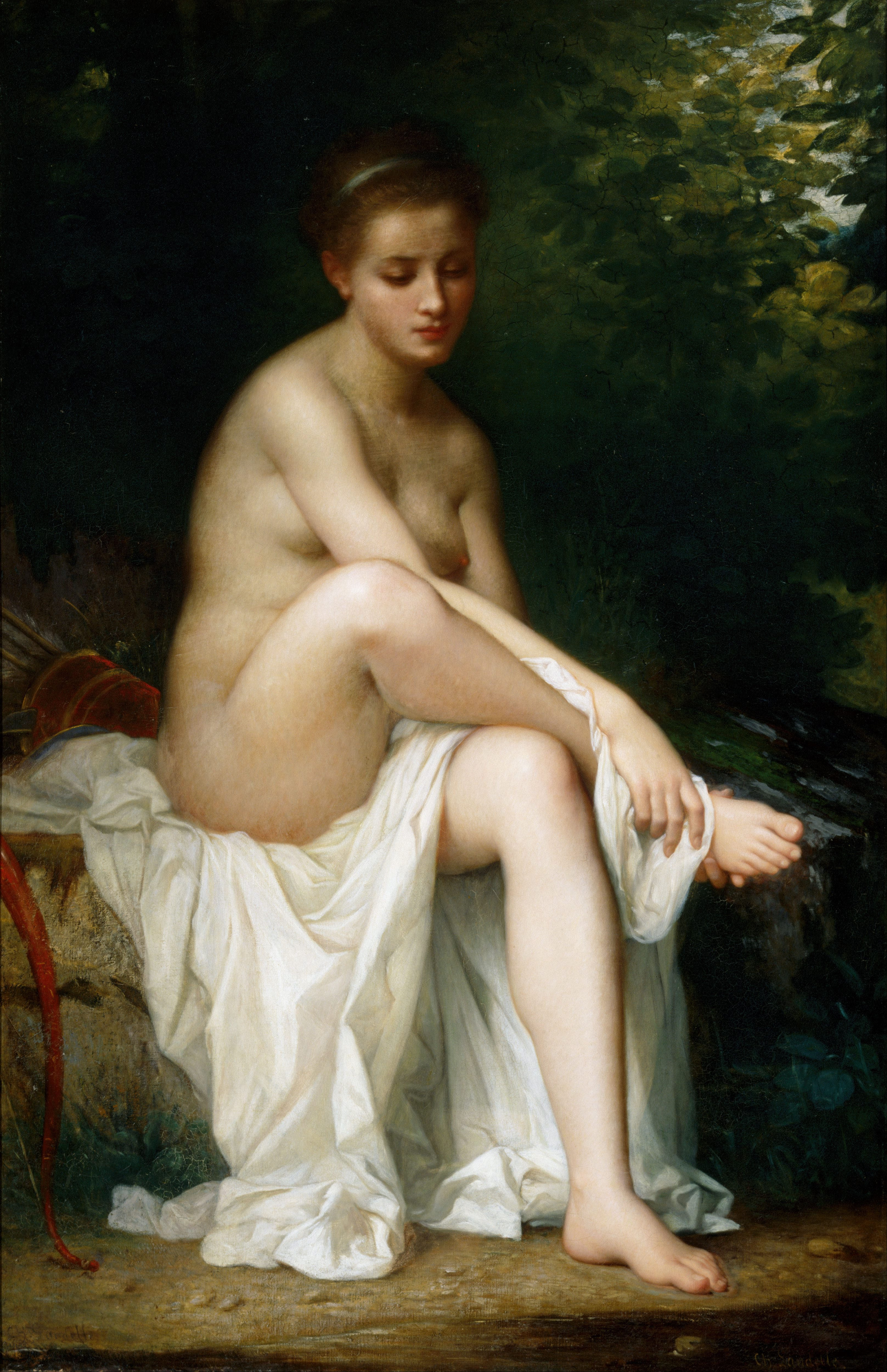
Ismene, Nymph of Diana

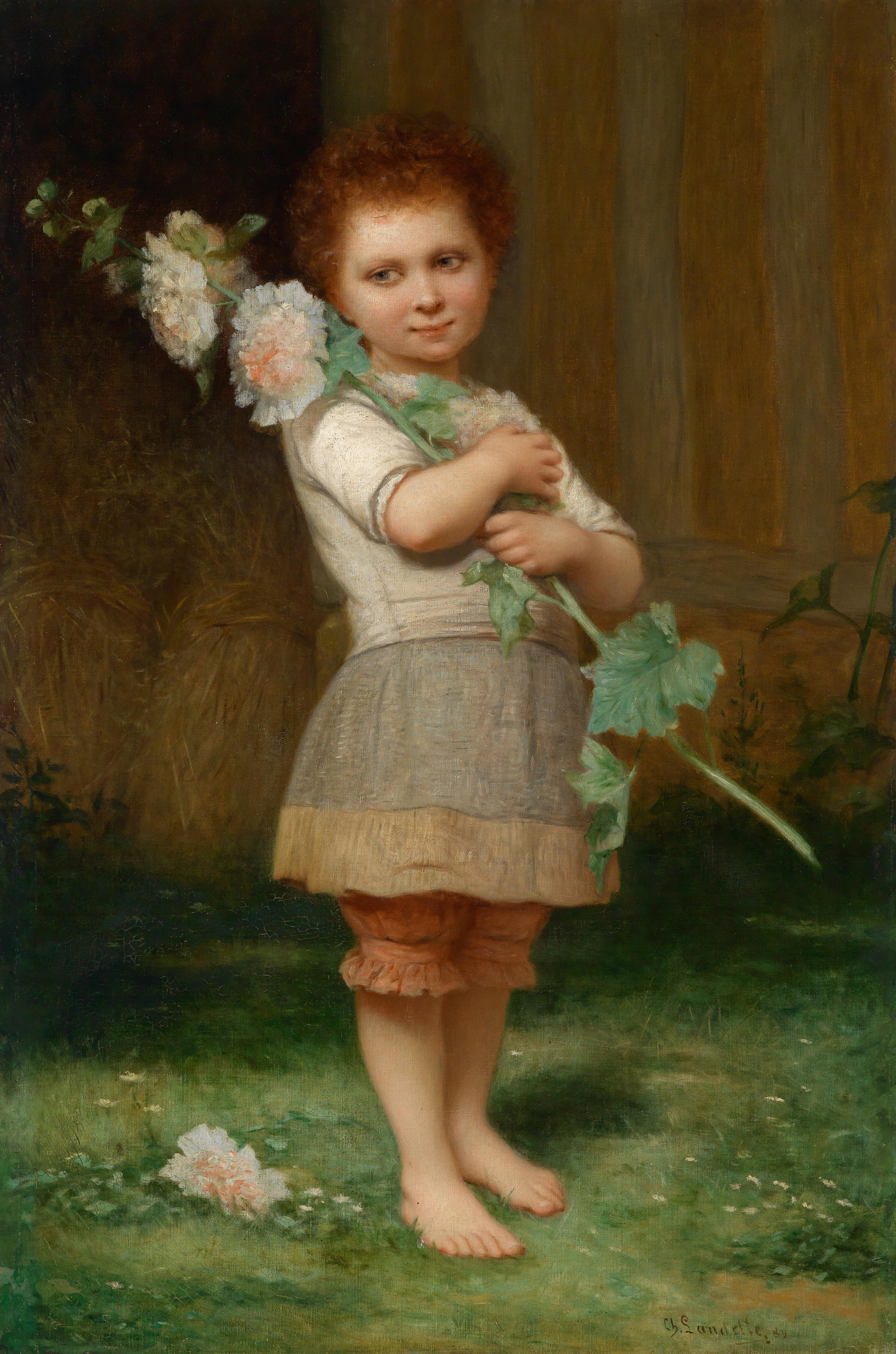
Girl with a Mallow Branch

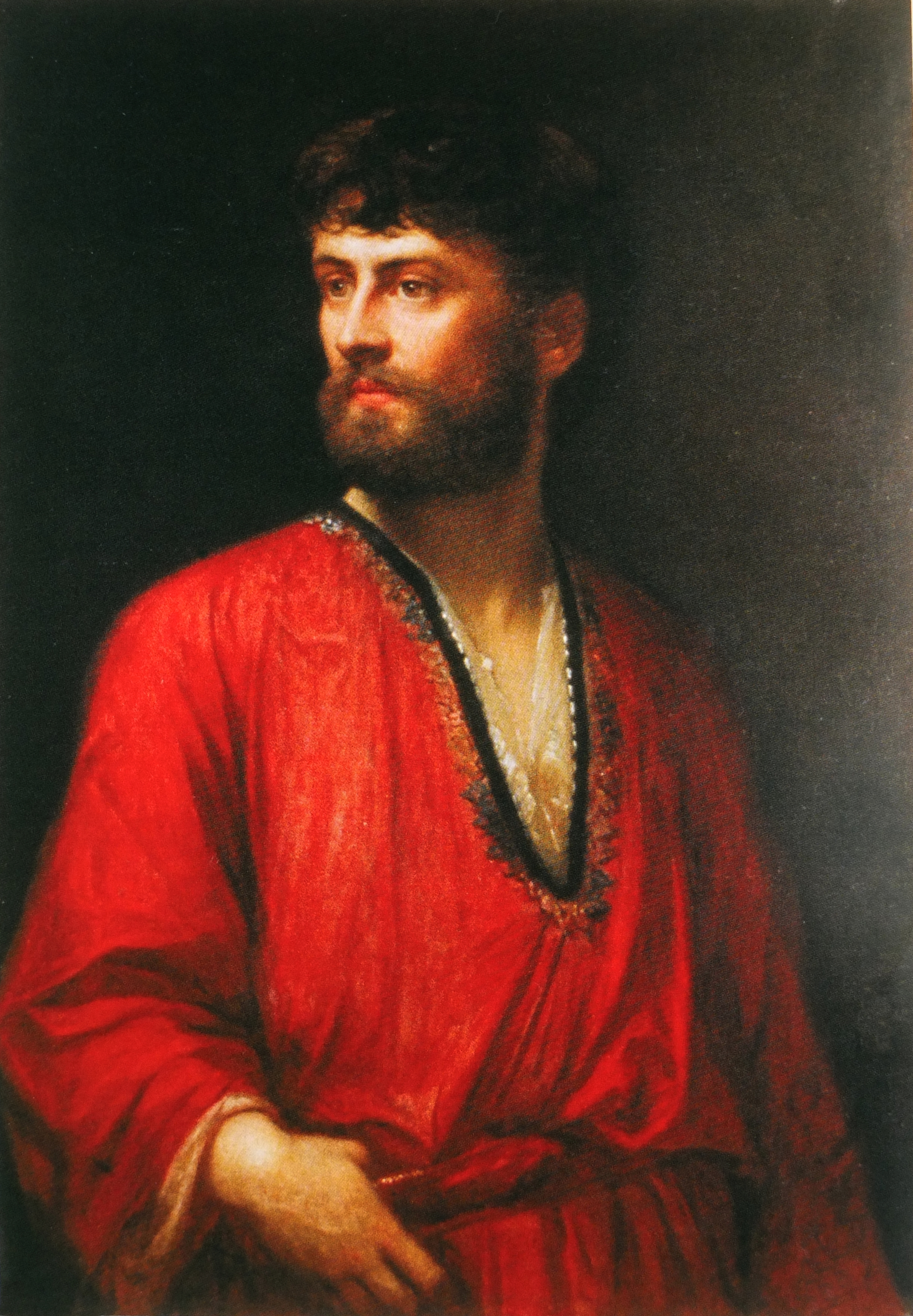
The Actor,
Jean Mounet-Sully

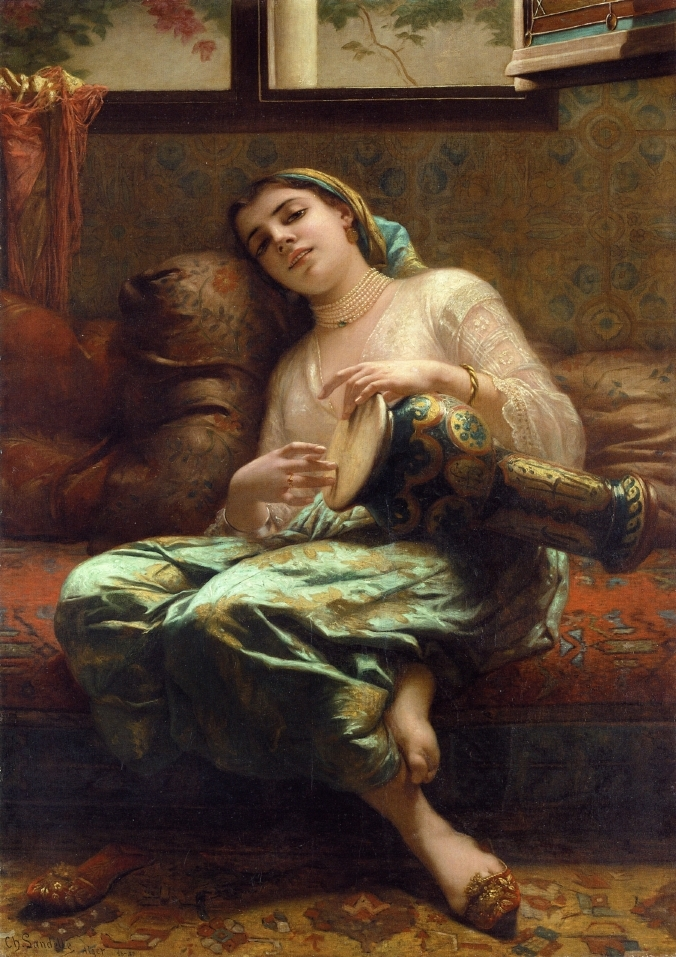
Algerian Woman
Playing a Darbouka

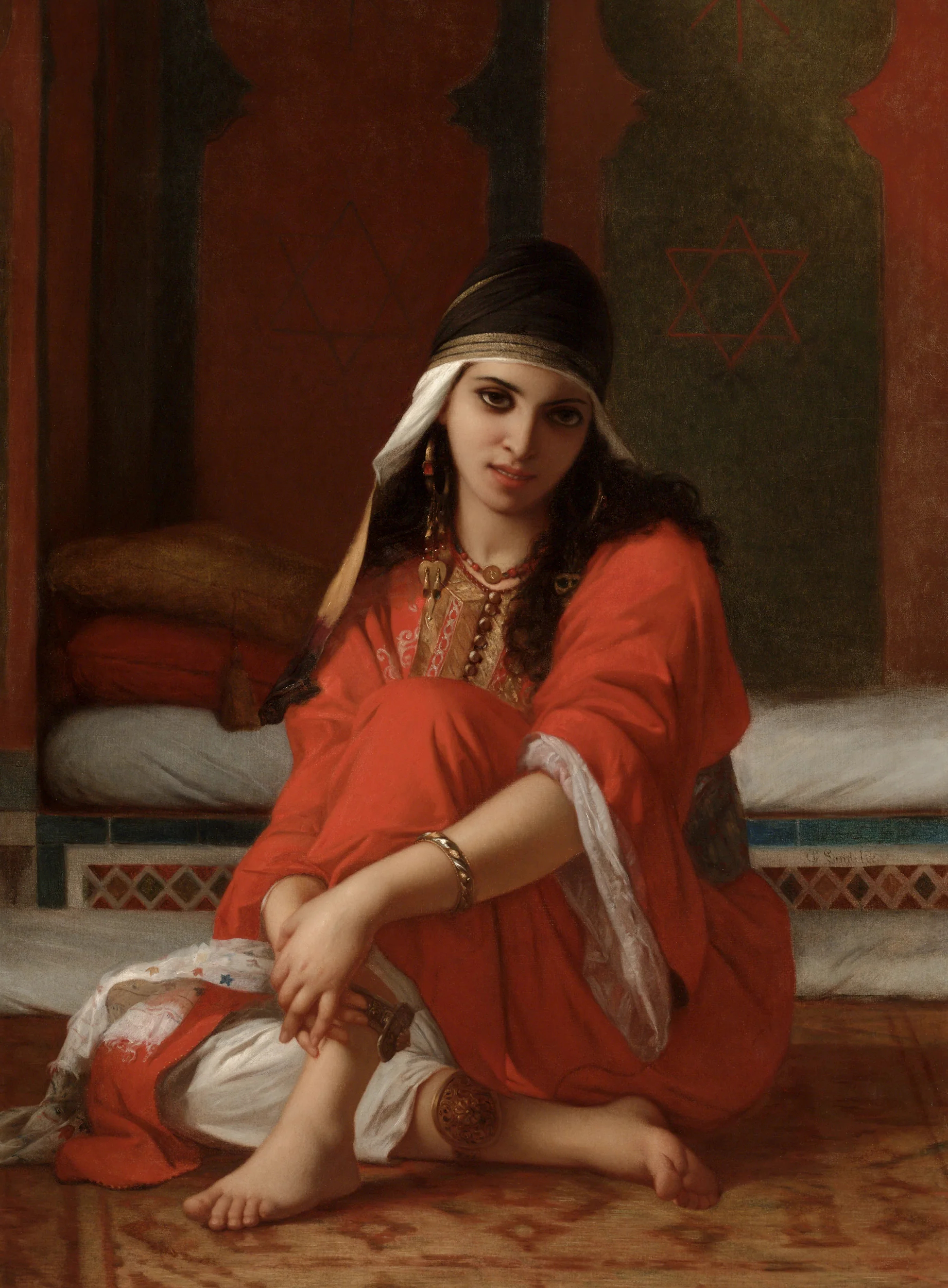
Young Girl from Tetuan

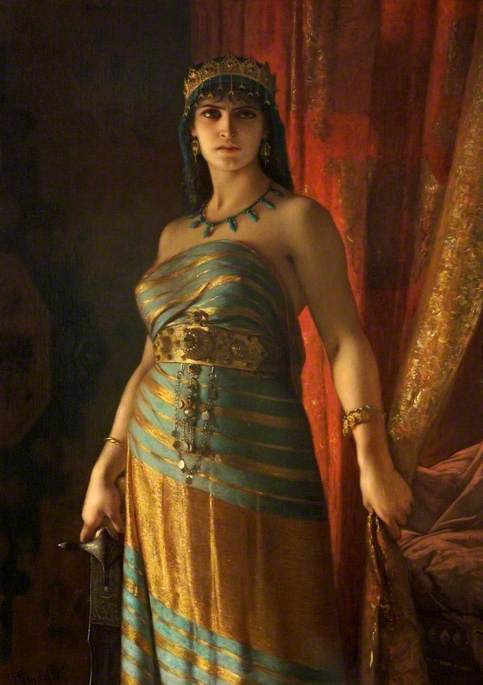
Judith

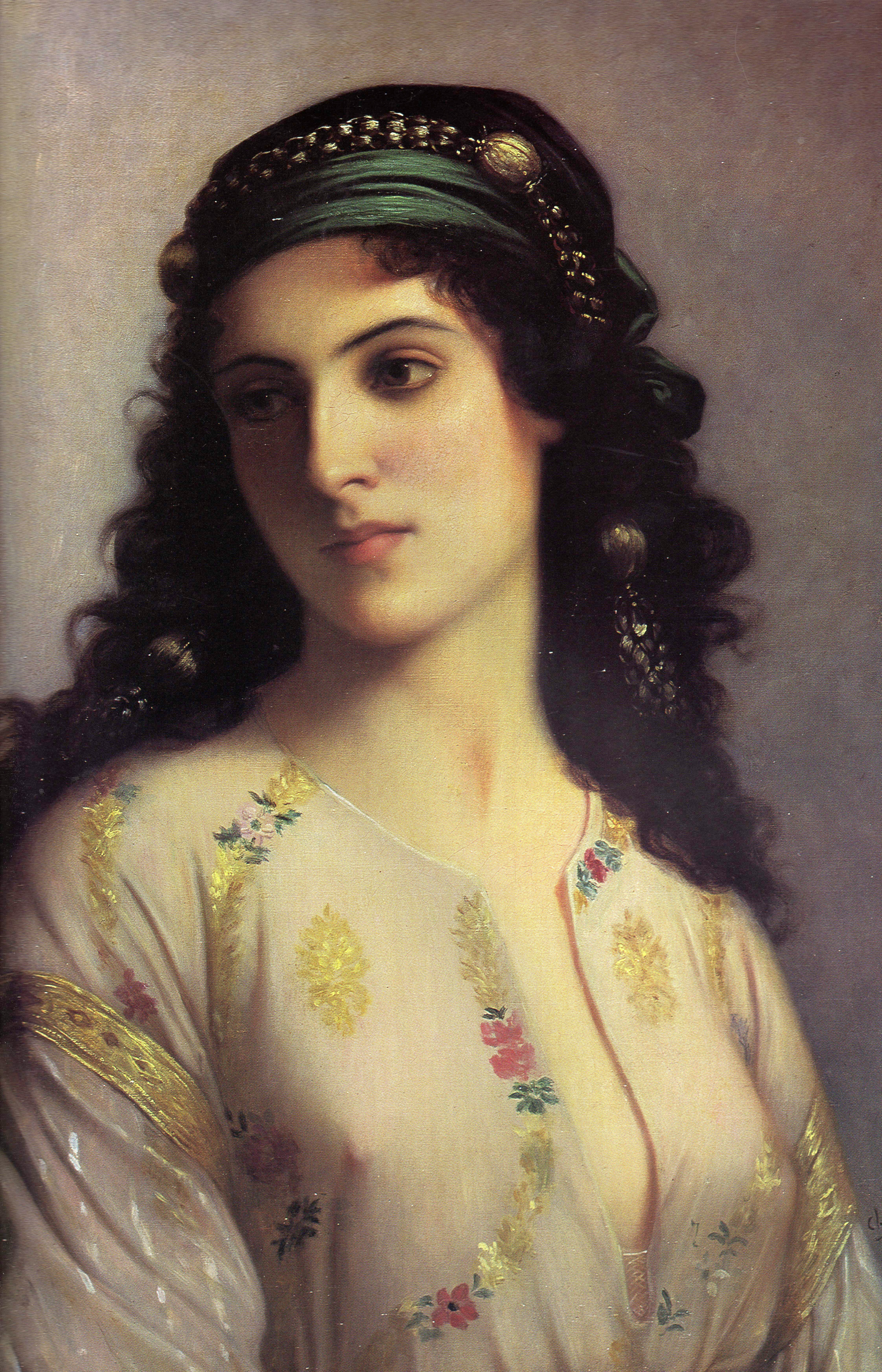
Jewish woman from Tangier
