= Musée Magnin =

Art museum in Dijon, France

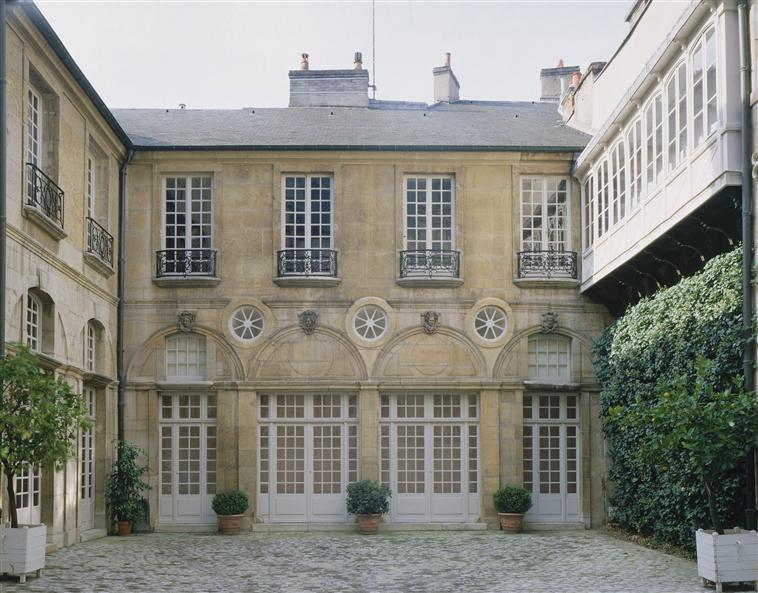
- Entrance of the museum
- Established: 1938; 88 years ago
- Location: Hôtel Lantin; 4 Rue des Bons Enfants; 21 000 Dijon
- Coordinates: 47.320967°N 5.042262°E
- Type: Art museum
- Website: musee-magnin.fr

The Musée Magnin (French pronunciation: [myze maɲɛ̃]; English: Magnin Museum) is a national museum in the French city of Dijon in Burgundy, in the Côte-d'Or department, with a collection of around 2,000 works of art collected by Maurice Magnin and his sister Jeanne and bequeathed to the State in 1938, along with the Hôtel Lantin, a 17th-century hôtel particulier in the old-town quarter of Dijon where it is now displayed as an amateur collector's cabinet of curiosities and as the Magnin family home.

== Building ==
Built between 1652 and 1681 for Étienne Lantin, a councillor in the local Audit Court, the townhouse became the property of the Magnin family in the 19th century, when Jean-Hugues Magnin (1791–1856) bought it in 1829. Without altering its historic flavor, the townhouse was redesigned in the 1930s by the Parisian architect Auguste Perret, to house the collection that Maurice Magnin, a year after the death of his sister Jeanne, willed to the State in 1938. This choice followed donations to the Musée Jacquemart-André in 1912, and the Musée Bonnat in 1922. In accordance with the donor's wishes, the museum has retained its characters as an amateur's cabinet and private dwelling, and can neither lend nor expand the collection.

Selected works

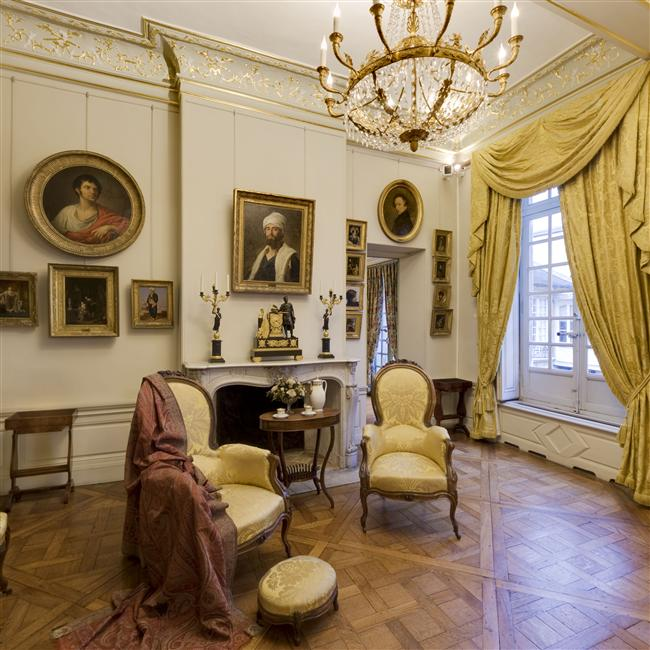
Golden Lounge

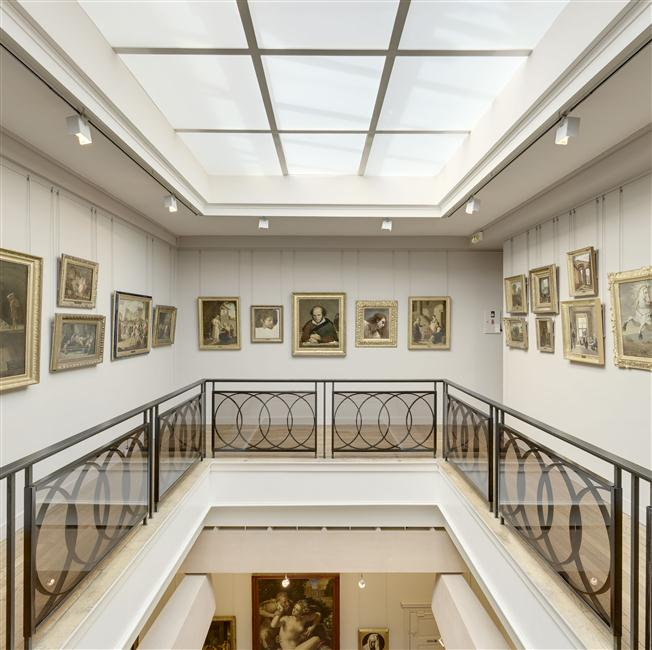
1st Empire Gallery

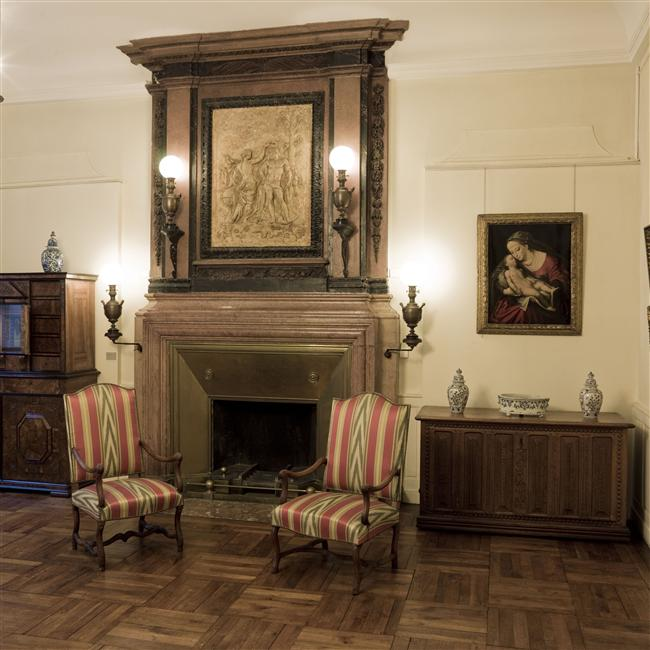
Hercules' Room

== Collection ==
Maurice Magnin (1861–1939), referendum councilor in Accounts Court and art lover, and his sister Jeanne (1855–1937), painter and amateur art critic, randomly put together, through public auctions, a collection of major artists and little known minor masters. Brother and sister "looked less for the often illusionary spark of great names, than for a chain of talent throughout the ages".

== Gallery ==
Selected works

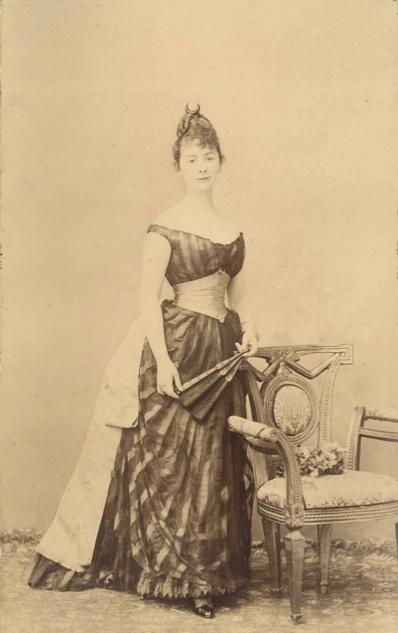
Jeanne Magnin

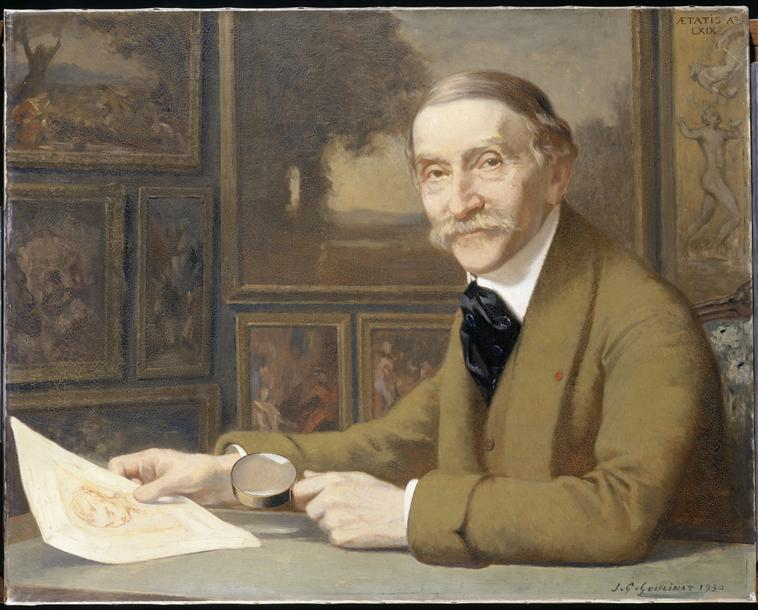
Jean-Gabriel Goulinat, Portrait of Maurice Magnin', 1930

=== Paintings ===
The collectors manifested a predilection for the French School from the 16th to the 19th centuries, especially well represented. Important 17th-century works from Eustache Le Sueur, Laurent de La Hyre, Sébastien Bourdon and Jean Baptiste de Champaigne highlight this latter collection.

The museum visit begins with the galleries dedicated to the Northern Schools. Here one can admires, among many others works of Maerten de Vos, Roelant Savery, Jacobus Ferdinandus Saey, Bartholomeus van der Helst, Jan Baptist Huysmans, Jan Peeter Verdussen and Gerard de Lairesse.

Northern School

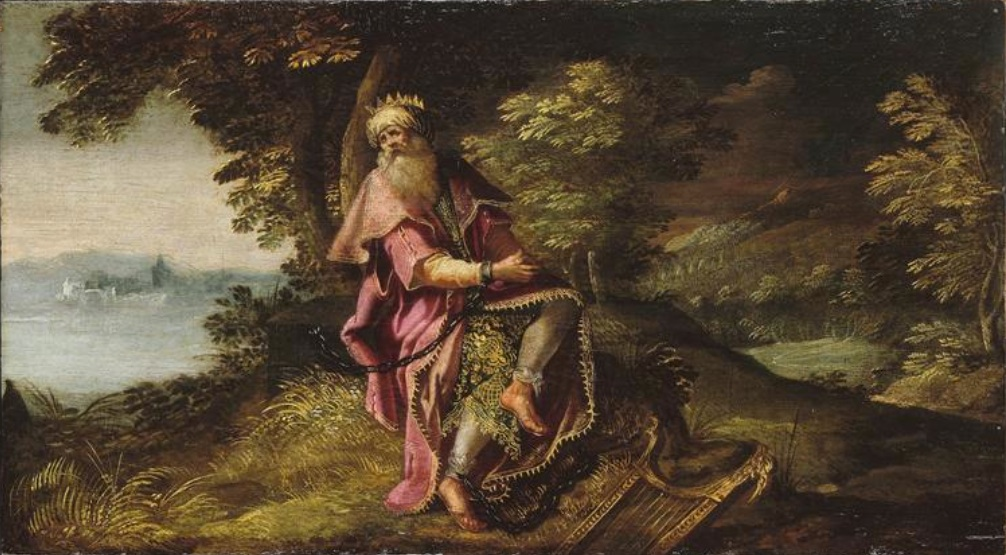
Maerten de Vos, King Manasseh in exile

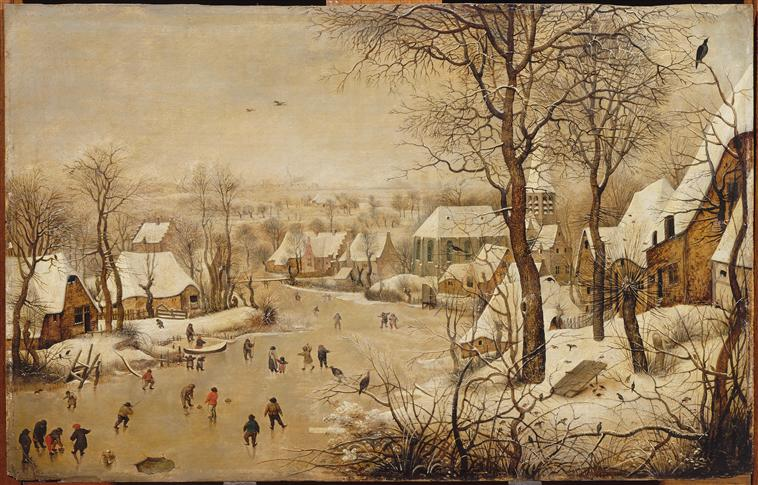
Pieter Brueghel the Younger, Winter pleasures, after 1565

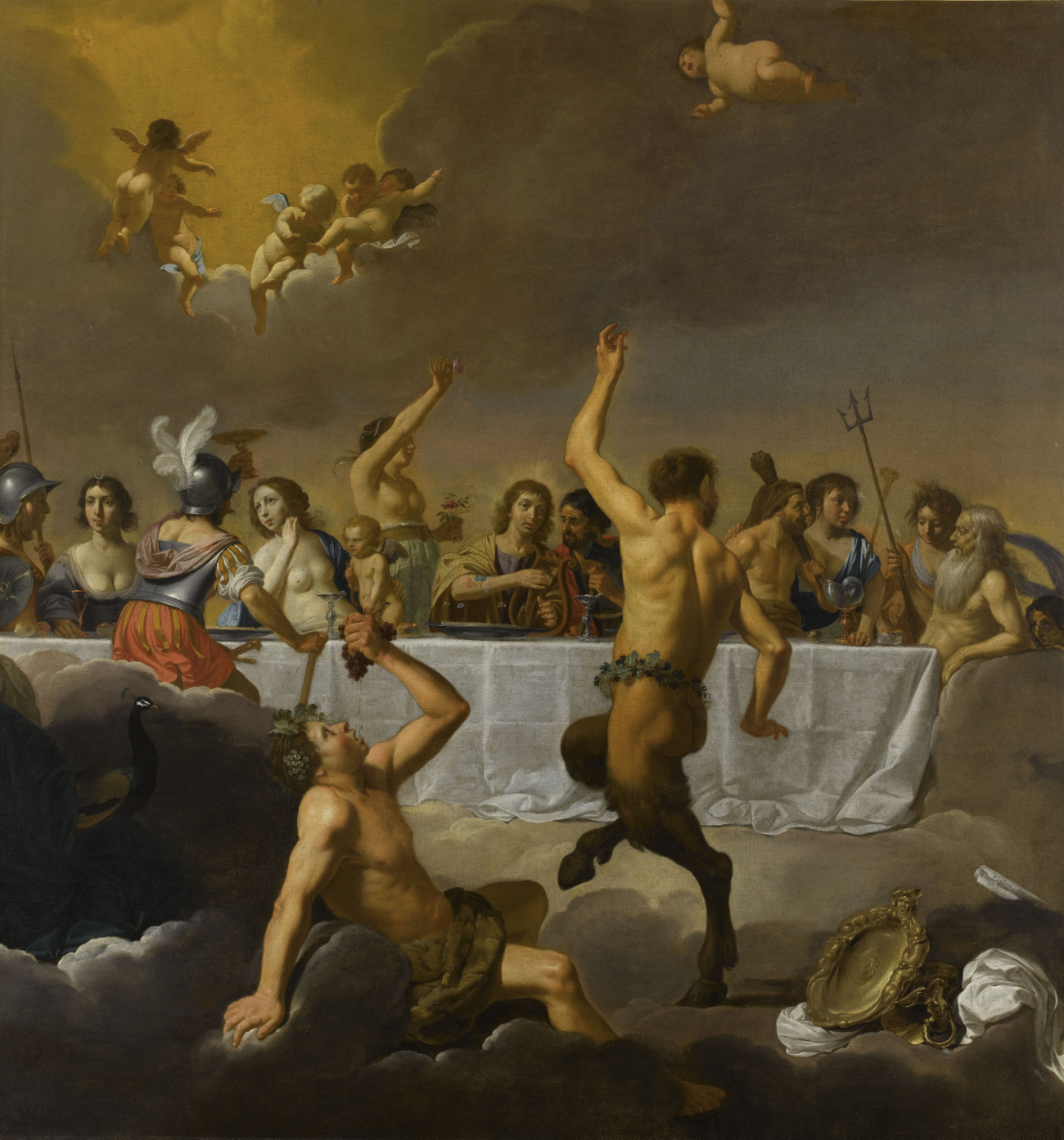
Jan van Bijlert, The banquet of gods, middle 17th century

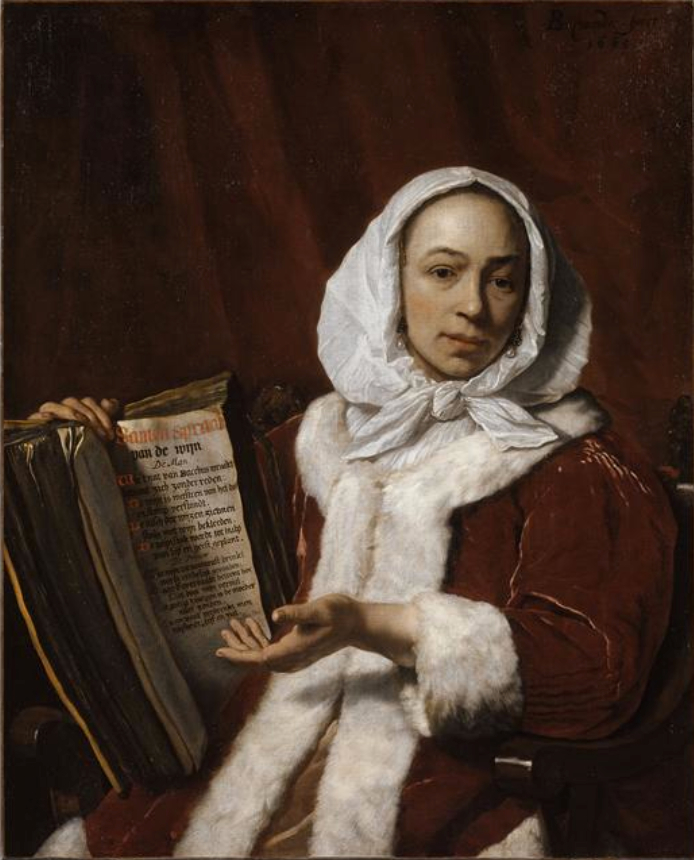
Bartholomeus van der Helst, La femme au livre, around 1665

Italian art is equally well represented, especially by the Venetian Schools of the 16th century (among which Christ and the Adultress by Giovanni Cariani is one of the highlights) and the 18th century (notably Giovanni Battista Tiepolo, Giovanni Antonio Pellegrini). There are also examples from both the Lombardian and Neapolitan Schools (notably Giovanni Stefano Danedi called Montalto, Giovanni Battista Cerano, Gaspare Traversi).

Italian School

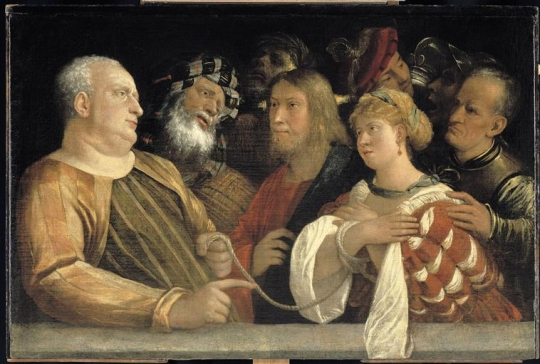
Giovanni Cariani, Christ and the Adultress, 1500s

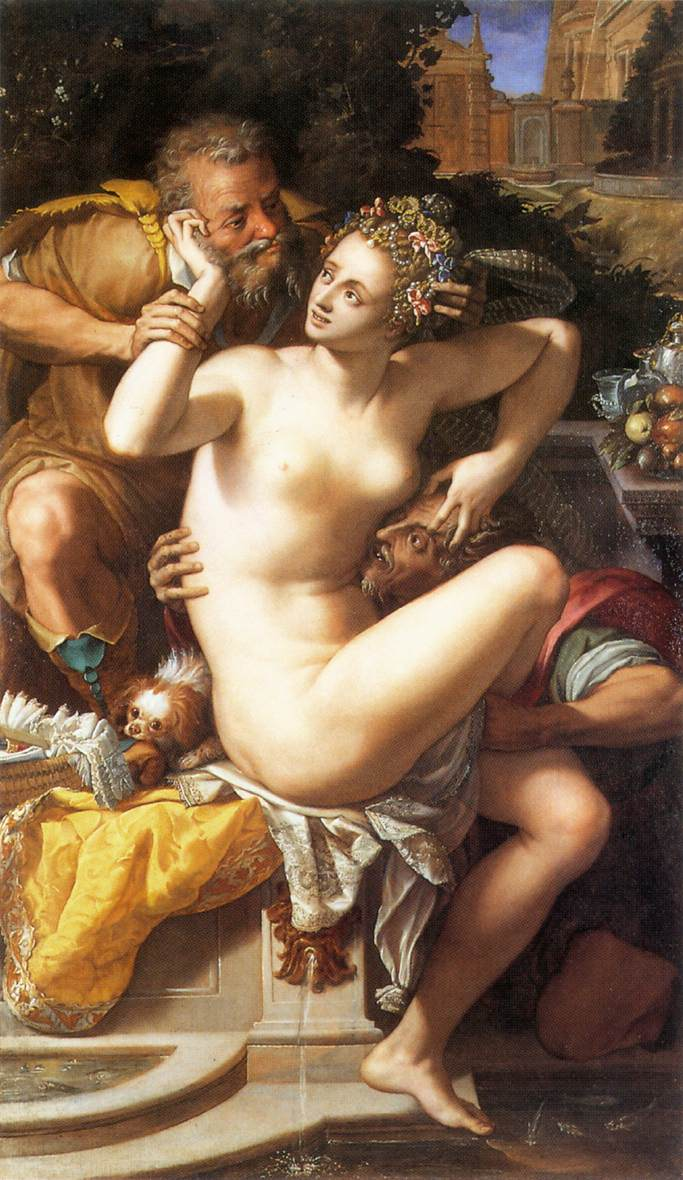
Alessandro Allori, Susanna and the Elders, 1561

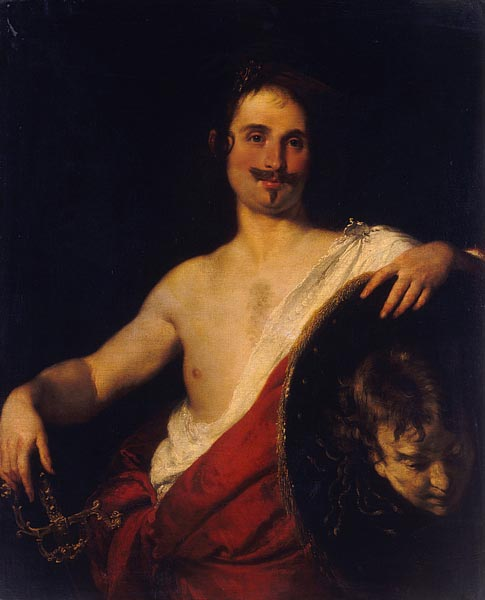
Bernardo Strozzi, Portrait of Correggio as Perseus, c. 1631

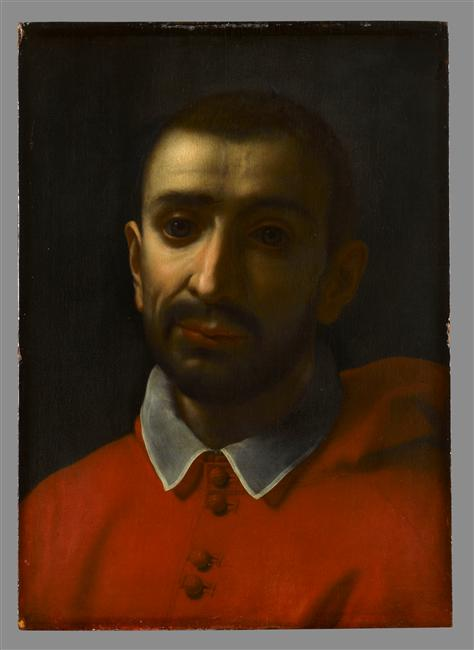
Carlo Dolci, Portrait of Coarlos Borromeus, 1659

By choosing carefully, the Magnins accumulated an exceptional group of 17th French paintings. The two Putti Musicians by Laurent de La Hyre, The dream of Poliphile by Eustache Le Sueur and The Holy Family by Sébastien Bourdon all illustrate the Parisian Atticism of the years between 1640 and 1650.

French School

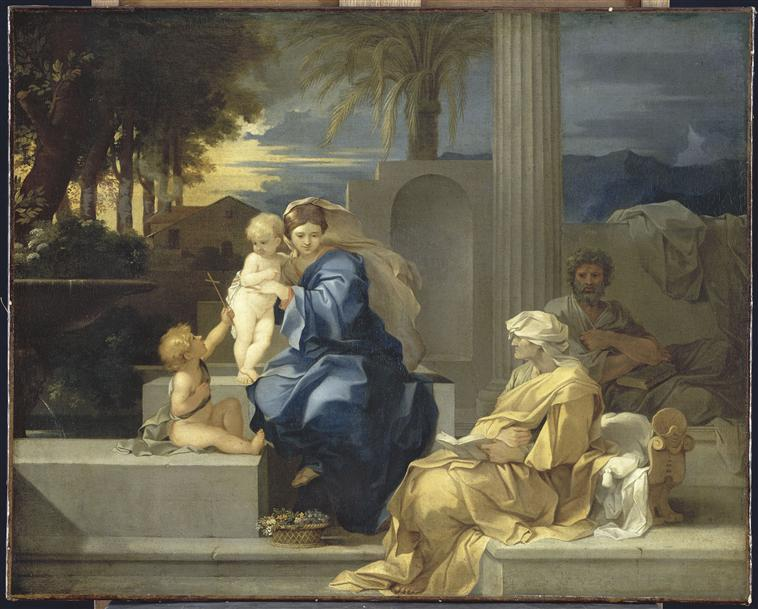
Sébastien Bourdon, The Holy Family, around 1650–1660

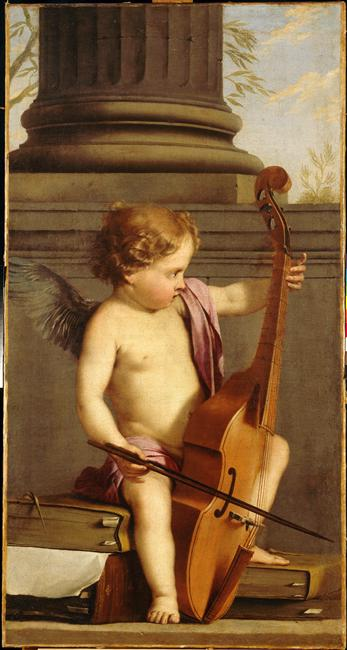
Laurent de La Hyre, Musician Putto, around 1649

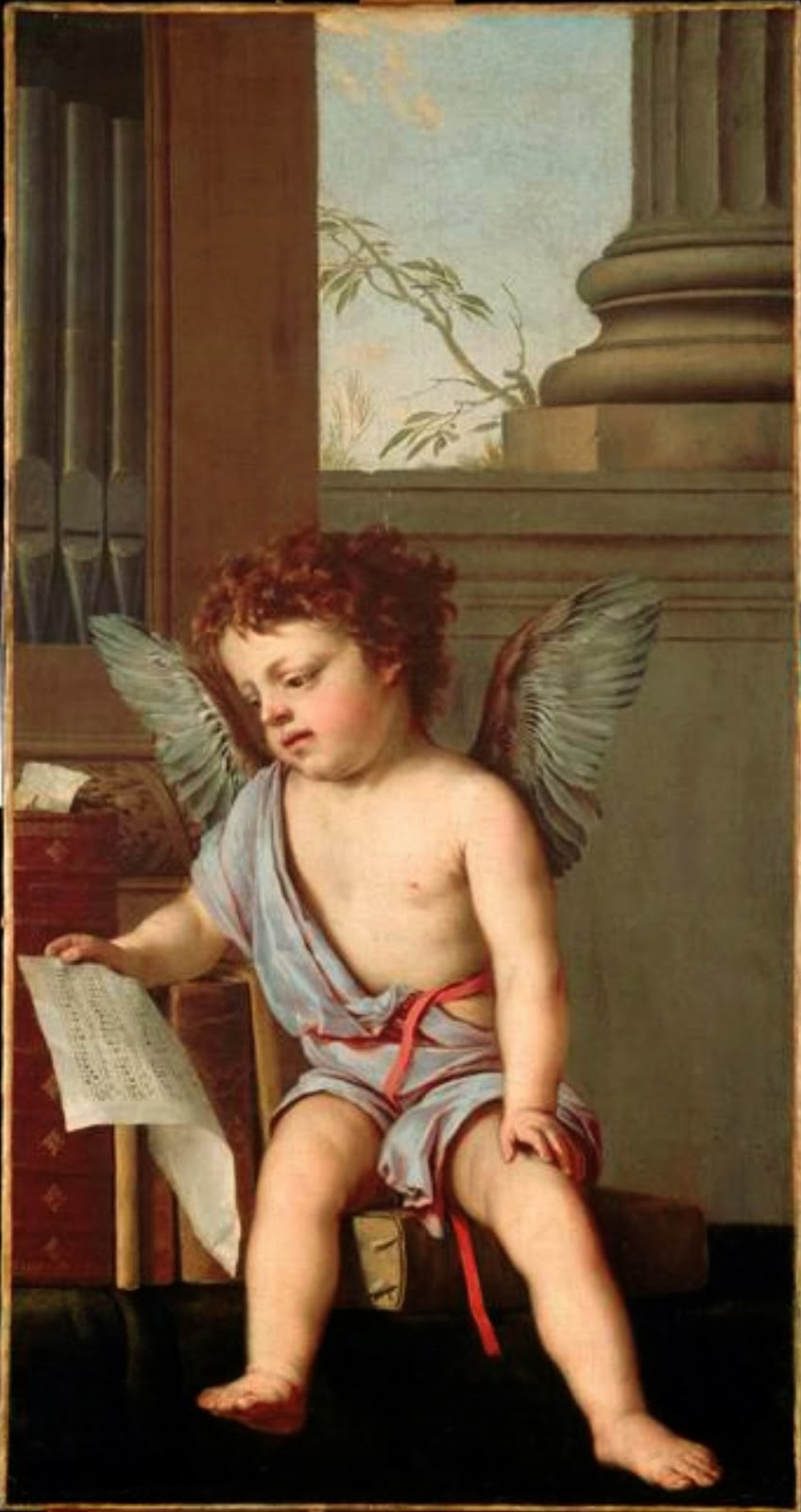
Laurent de La Hyre, Singing Putto, around 1649

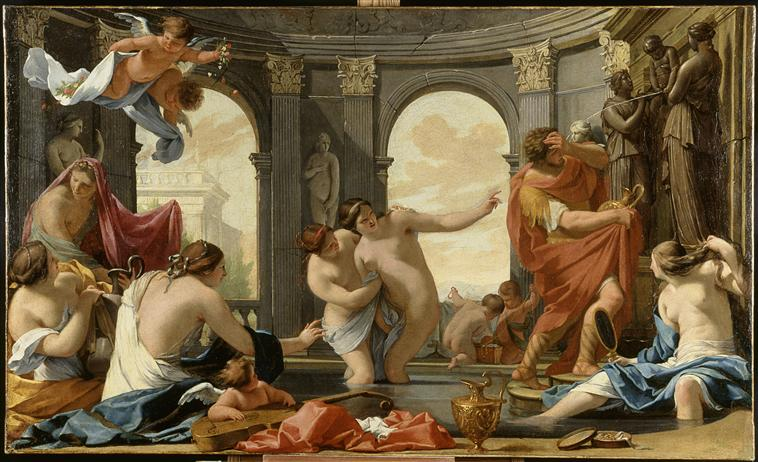
Eustache Le Sueur, Poliphile in bath with the nymphs, around 1640

The 18th century has not been neglected, but is more represented by drawings and paintings of minor masters (Hyacinthe Collin de Vermont, Michel-François Dandré-Bardon, Jean-Baptiste Marie Pierre), than the grand painters like Jean-Antoine Watteau and Jean-Honoré Fragonard whose works acquired by the Magnins are no longer attributed to them.

The 19th century collection confirms the definitive and original taste of the collectors. Here one finds fewer beacons of Neo-classicism, Romanticism or Realism than paintings of François-Xavier Fabre, Pauline Gauffier or for the Post-revolutionary period the subtle and extremely rare landscapes of Anne-Louis Girodet de Roussy-Trioson. Their appreciation of the intimist works of the 1830s is obvious in their choice of artists such as François Marius Granet, Étienne Bouhot or for the Romantic period, Paul Delaroche, Alexandre-Évariste Fragonard or Eugène Devéria.

Selected works

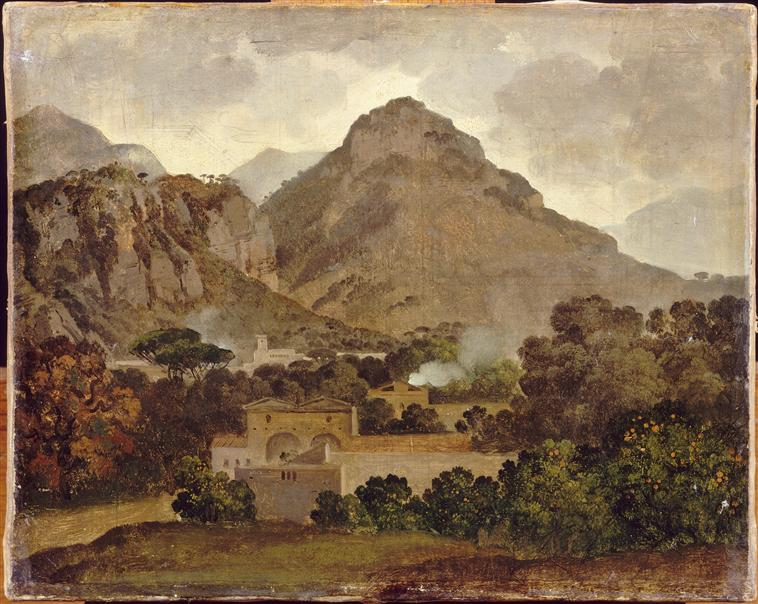
Anne-Louis Girodet, Italian landscape, around 1793

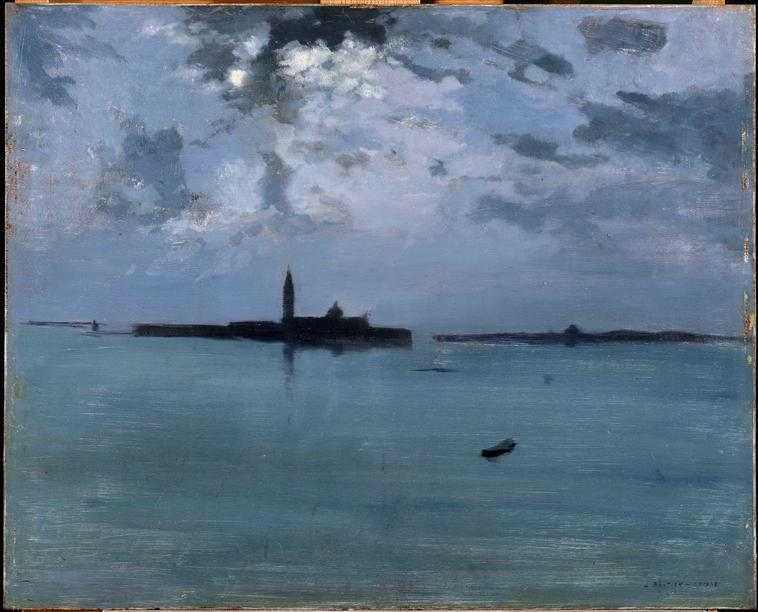
Jules Bastien-Lepage, Night on the lagoon, 1881

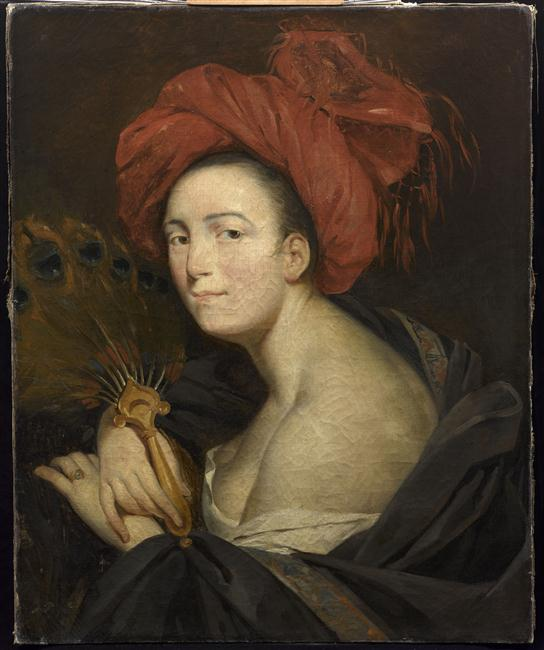
Claude-Marie Dubufe (attributed to), Woman with a turban, around 1830

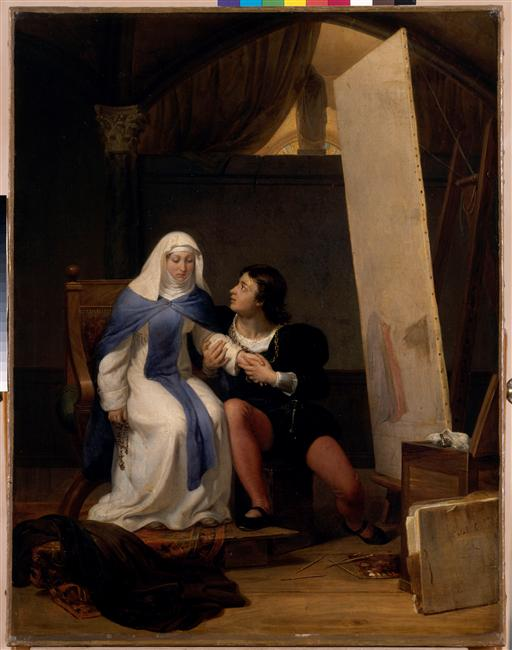
Paul Delaroche, Filippo Lippi et Lucrezia Buti, 1822

The originality of this collection resides not only in the variety of artists represented but also in curiosity the Magnins had for the provincial schools. With Burgundian origins, Jeanne and Maurice involved themselves with art from their region as well as from Franche-Comté. Among some of the artists found at the museum, we can name Jean Bardin, Bénigne Gagneraux, Jean-François Gilles Colson and Jean-Claude Naigeon.

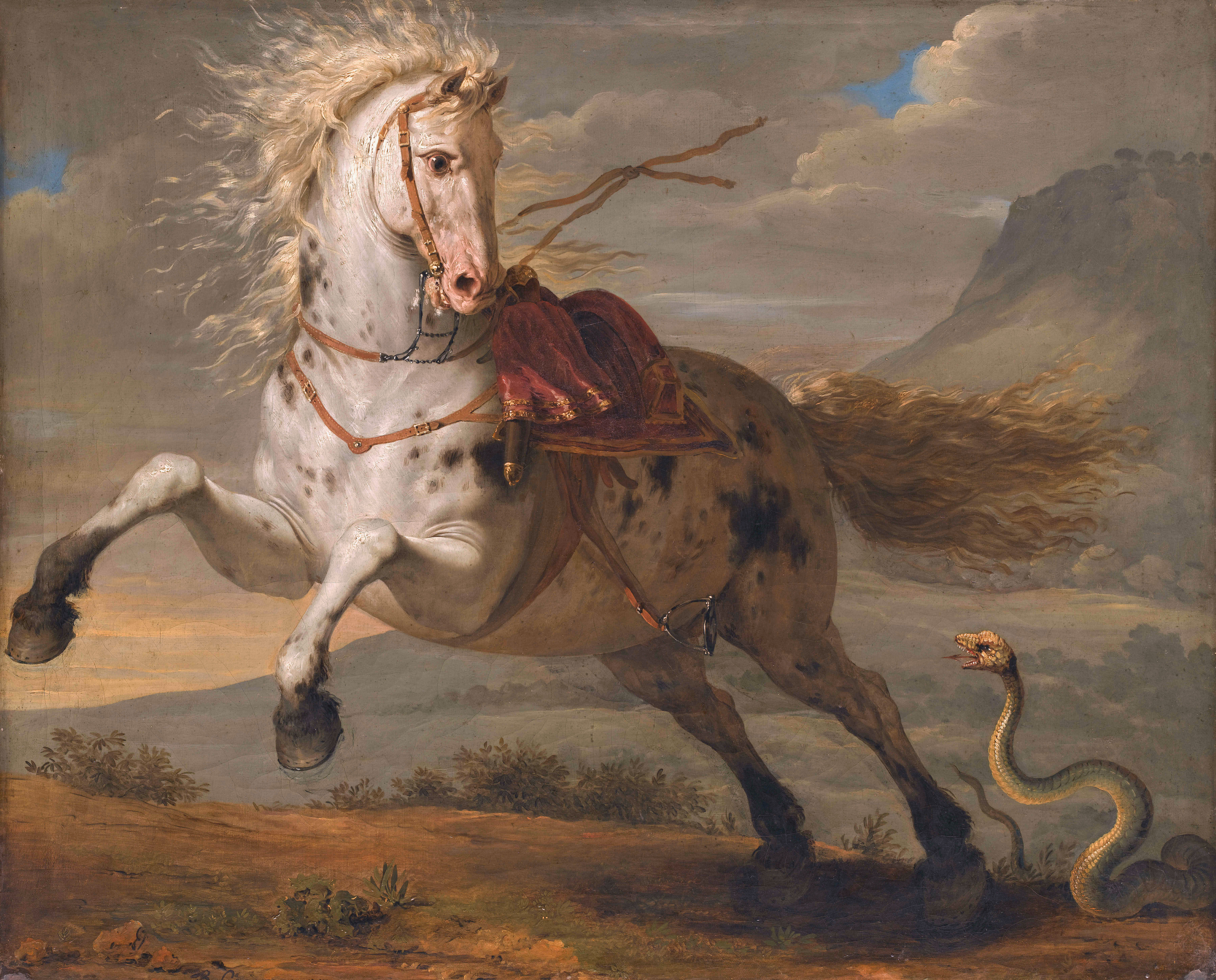
Bénigne Gagnereaux, The horse and the snake, 1787

=== Works of art and graphic arts ===
The Magnin Museum is not only dedicated to paintings. It brings together a wonderful body of drawing from French and foreign schools, and offers the visitor an ensemble of furniture, works of art and sculptures: in short, a choice of seductive works. One can stop to admire the Secrétaire de dame à double pente (Lady's secretary with double slope) with the stamp of Bon Durand (Master in 1761) or in front of the sober Commode of Courte, a cabinet-maker from Dijon. There are also a few sculptures in the collection such as Auguste Préault's The Wave.

Selected works

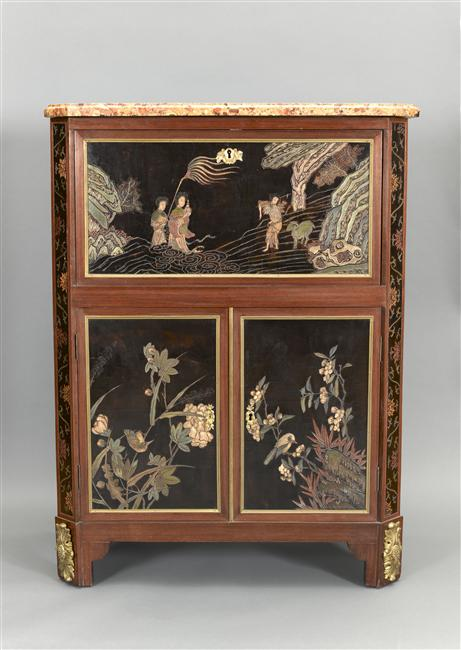
Writing desk in a cupboard

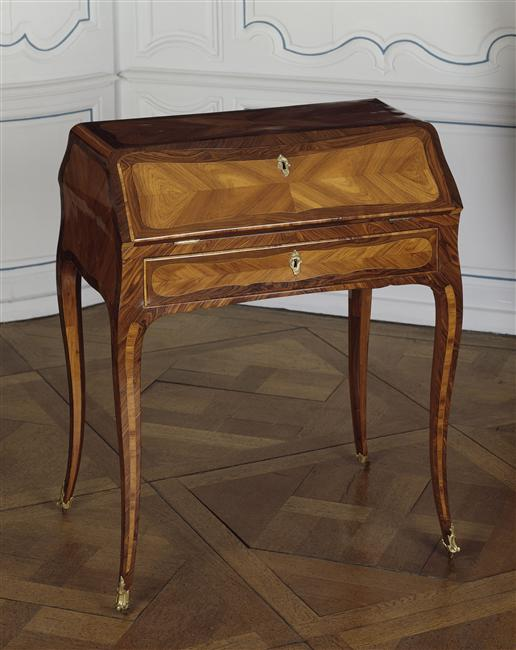
Lady’s secretary with a double slope

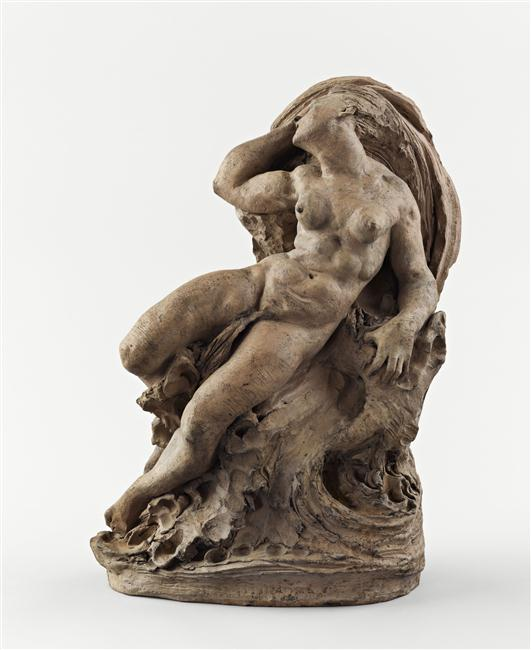
Auguste Préault, The Wave, 1856

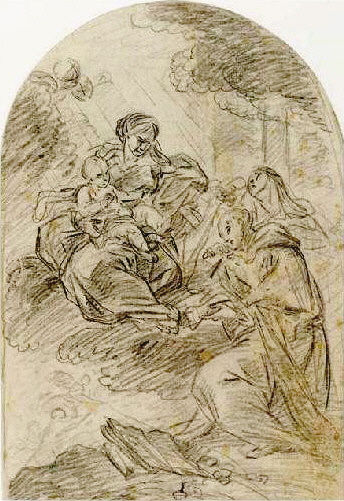
J-F. Parrocel, The Holy Virgin with Jesus

== Bibliography ==
- Brejon de Lavergnée Arnauld, Catalogue des tableaux et des dessins italiens (XVe-XIX siècles), Inventaire des collections publiques françaises, Paris, 1980.
- Exposition catalog, Éloge de la clarté, un courant artistique au temps de Mazarin, Dijon, 1998.
- Exposition catalog, Visions du déluge, de la Renaissance au XIXe siècle, Paris, 2006.
- Exposition booklet, Charles Meynier 1763-1832, Paris, 2008
- Exposition album, Dessins français du XVIIe au XIXe siècle de la collection du musée Magnin, Dijon, 2008
- Exposition catalog, Boucher et les peintres du Nord, Paris, 2004.
- Termeulen Vincent, Les arts mobiliers du musée Magnin, Paris, 2008
- Les Peintures françaises, illustrated catalogue, preface by Emmanuel Starcky, with contributions from Hélène Isnard, Paris, Dijon, musée Magnin, 2000.
