= Galatea (mythological statue) =

Nereid from Greek mythology

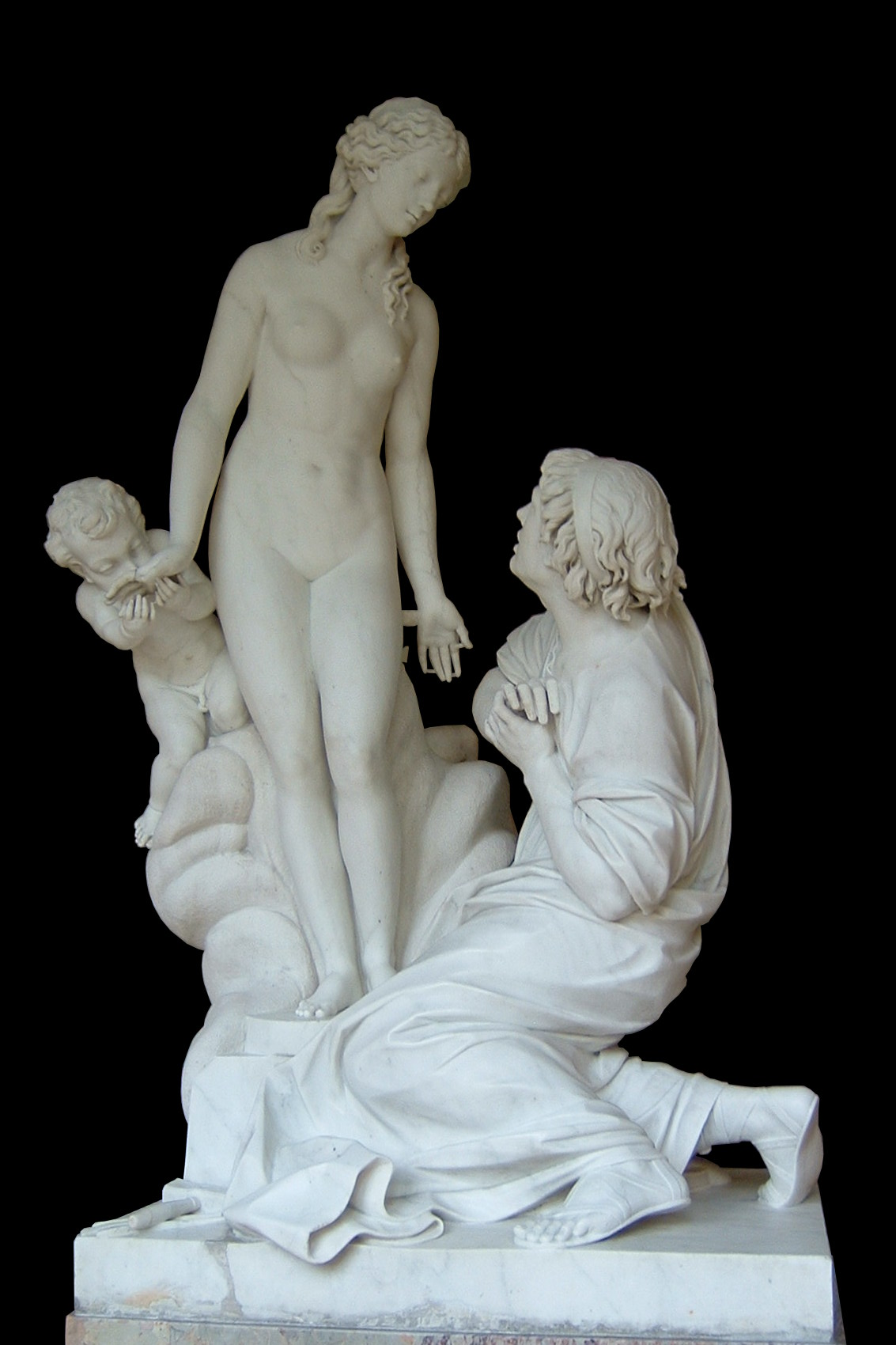
Falconet's 1763 sculpture Pygmalion and Galatea (Walters Art Museum, Baltimore)

In Greek and Roman mythology, Galatea (/ˌɡæləˈtiːə/; Ancient Greek: Γαλάτεια, romanized: Galáteia, lit. 'she who is milk-white') is the post-antique name popularly applied to the statue carved of ivory alabaster and loved by Pygmalion of Cyprus, which then came to life by the will of Aphrodite, the goddess of Cyprus. In surviving classical sources, this statue has no proper name, with "Galatea" being established by eighteenth-century writers, although the name is now inextricably tied to the statue ever since.

== Etymology ==
Though the name "Galatea" has become so firmly associated with Pygmalion's statue as to seem antique, its use in connection with Pygmalion originated with a post-classical writer. No extant ancient text mentions the statue's name, although Pausanias mentions a statue of Calm, Galene (Ancient Greek: Γαλήνη). As late as 1763, a sculpture of the subject shown by Falconet at the Paris Salon (see illustration) carried the title Pygmalion aux pieds de sa statue qui s'anime ("Pygmalion at the feet of his statue that comes to life"). That sculpture, currently at the Walters Art Museum in Baltimore, now bears the expected modern title Pygmalion and Galatea.

According to Meyer Reinhold, the name "Galatea" was first given wide circulation in Jean-Jacques Rousseau's scène lyrique of 1762, Pygmalion. The name had become a commonplace of pastoral fictions, because of the well-known myth of Acis and Galatea; one of Honoré d'Urfé's characters in L'Astrée was a Galatea, though not this sculptural creation.

== Myth ==
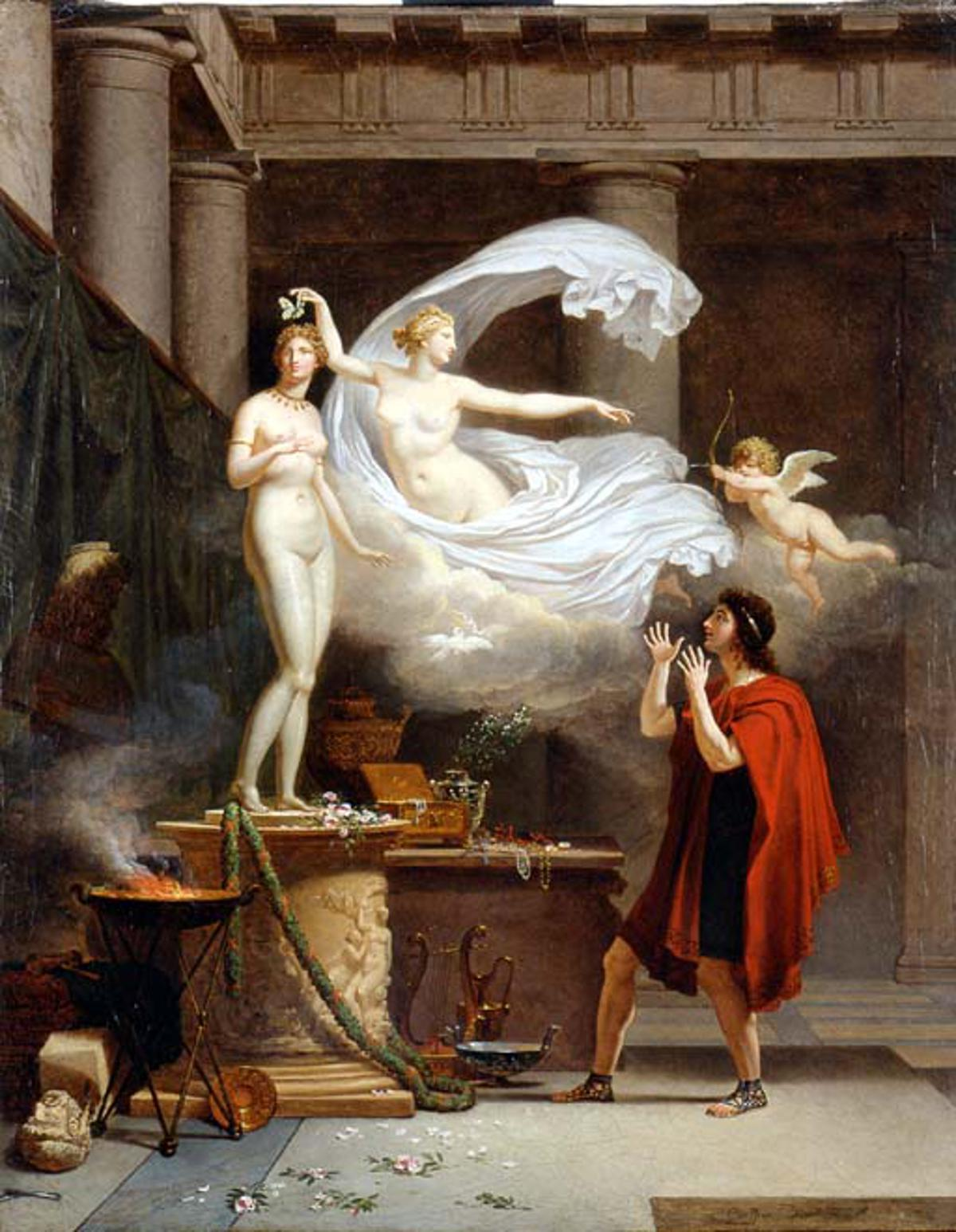
Pygmalion and Galatea by Louis Gauffier, 1797

The story of Pygmalion appeared earliest in a Hellenistic work, Philostephanus' history of Cyprus, "De Cypro". It is retold in Ovid's Metamorphoses, where the king Pygmalion is made into a sculptor who fell in love with a marble statue he had crafted with his own hands. In answer to his prayers, the goddess Aphrodite brought it to life and united the couple in marriage. This remained the classical telling until the end of the seventeenth century. The trope of the animated statue gained a vogue during the eighteenth century.

The daemon of Pygmalion's goddess, animating her cult image, bore him a son Paphus—the eponym of the city of Paphos—and Metharme. Of "this ecstatic relationship", Meyer Reinhold has remarked, "there may be lurking a survival of the ancient cult of the Great Goddess and her consort".

Cinyras, perhaps the son of Paphus, or perhaps the successful suitor of Metharme, founded the city of Paphos on Cyprus, under the patronage of Aphrodite, and built the great temple to the goddess there.

Bibliotheke, the Hellenistic compendium of myth long attributed to Apollodorus, mentions a daughter of Pygmalion named Metharme. She was the wife of Cinyras, and the mother of Adonis, beloved of Aphrodite, although Myrrha, daughter of Cinyras, is more commonly named as the mother of Adonis.

It was commonly rumored in Roman times that Praxiteles's cult image of Aphrodite of Knidos in Aphrodite's temple was so beautiful that at least one admirer arranged to be shut in with it overnight.

== Interpretation ==
The myth indicates that a cult image of Aphrodite was instrumental in some way in the founding myth of Paphos. It also seems axiomatic, apart from miraculous intervention, that the living representative of a cult image could be none but the chief priestess. Robert Graves gives a socio-political interpretation of the story, as a mythologized overthrow of a matrilineal cult. In his view Pygmalion, the consort of the goddess's priestess at the Sanctuary of Aphrodite Paphia, kept the cult image of Aphrodite as a means of retaining power during his term, after which, Graves speculates, he refused to give up the goddess's image "and that he prolonged this by marriage with another of Aphrodite's priestesses—technically his daughter, since she was heiress to the throne—who is called Metharme ("change"), to mark the innovation".

== See also ==
- Galene (mythology)
- List of Metamorphoses characters
- Galata, Cyprus
- Galatea (moon), a moon of Neptune
- 74 Galatea, main-belt asteroid
- Galatea, New Zealand
- La Galatea, 1585 book by Miguel de Cervantes
- Gallathea or Galatea, 1588 play by John Lyly
- Die schöne Galathée, 1865 operetta by Franz von Suppé
- Pygmalion and Galatea, 1871 play by W. S. Gilbert
- Galatea 2.2, 1995 pseudo-autobiographical novel by American writer Richard Powers
- Galatea is the name of the main flagship in the 1998 PC game Descent: FreeSpace – The Great War
- Galatea is the name of a character in the anime series Bubblegum Crisis Tokyo 2040
- Galatea is the name of the gynoid in the 1999 film Bicentennial Man.
- Galatea, a 2000 interactive fiction video game
- Galatea of Justice League Unlimited (2001–2006)
- Galatea, 2013 short story by Madeline Miller
