= Pygmalion and Galatea (Gauffier) =

Painting by Louis Gauffier

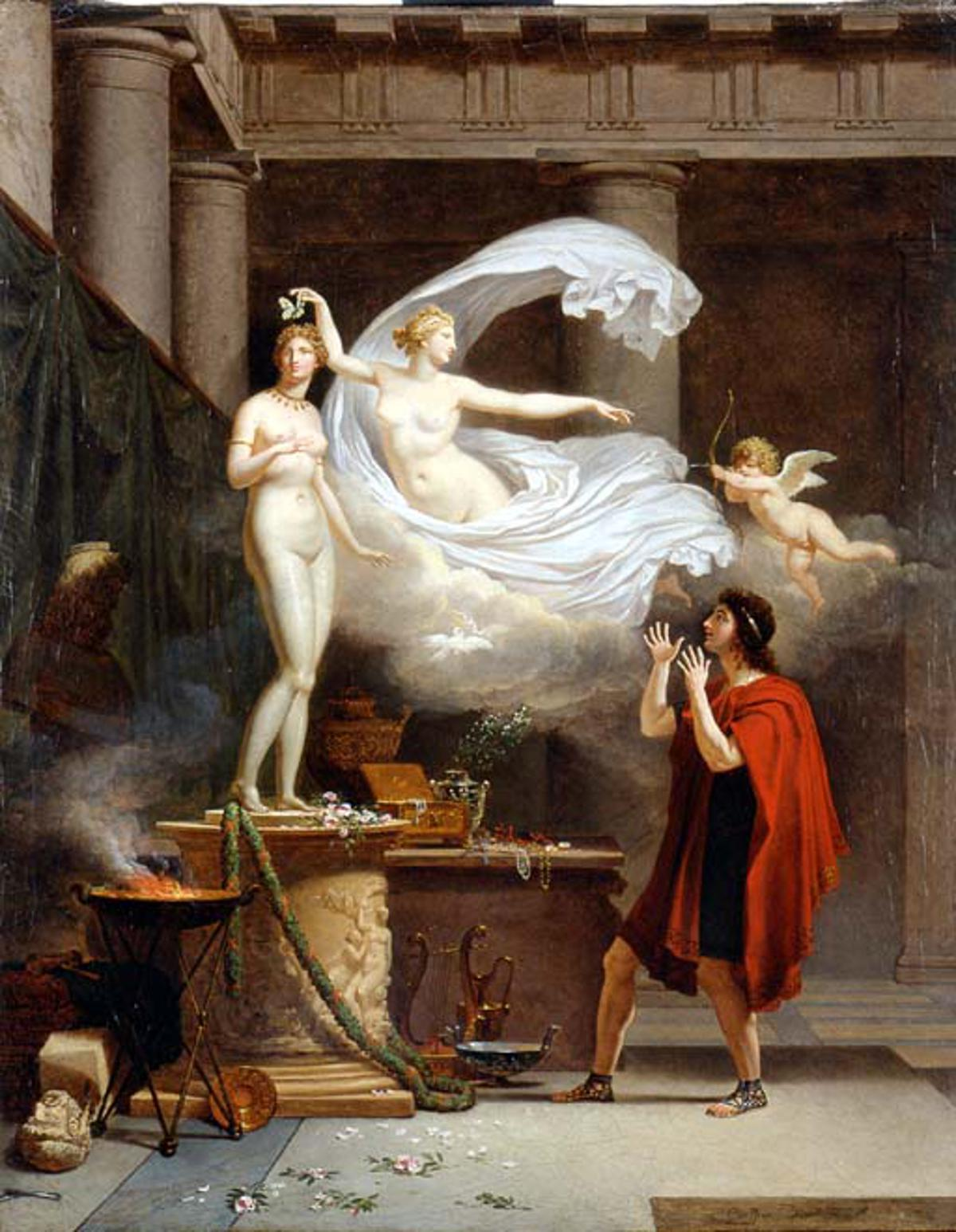
- Artist: Louis Gauffier
- Year: 1797
- Type: Oil on canvas, history painting
- Dimensions: 67.5 cm × 51.2 cm (26.6 in × 20.2 in)
- Location: Manchester Art Gallery, Greater Manchester

Pygmalion and Galatea is a 1797 oil painting by the French artist Louis Gauffier. A history painting it features the legendary story of the sculptor Pygmalion and Galatea, inspired by Ovid's Metamorphoses. Venus is shown with Cupid in tow, animating the statue of Galatea who Pygmalion has fallen in love with.

Gauffier was an Italian-based French exile, living in Florence following the French Revolution and supplying Neoclassical works for the British art market. Today the painting is in the collection of Manchester Art Gallery, having been acquired in 1979.

== Bibliography ==
- Bailey, Colin C. (ed.) The Loves of the Gods: Mythological Painting from Watteau to David. Kimbell Art Museum, 2007.
- Curtis, Penelope. On the Meanings of Sculpture in Painting. Henry Moore Institute, 2009.
