= Pauline Gauffier =

18th-century French woman painter

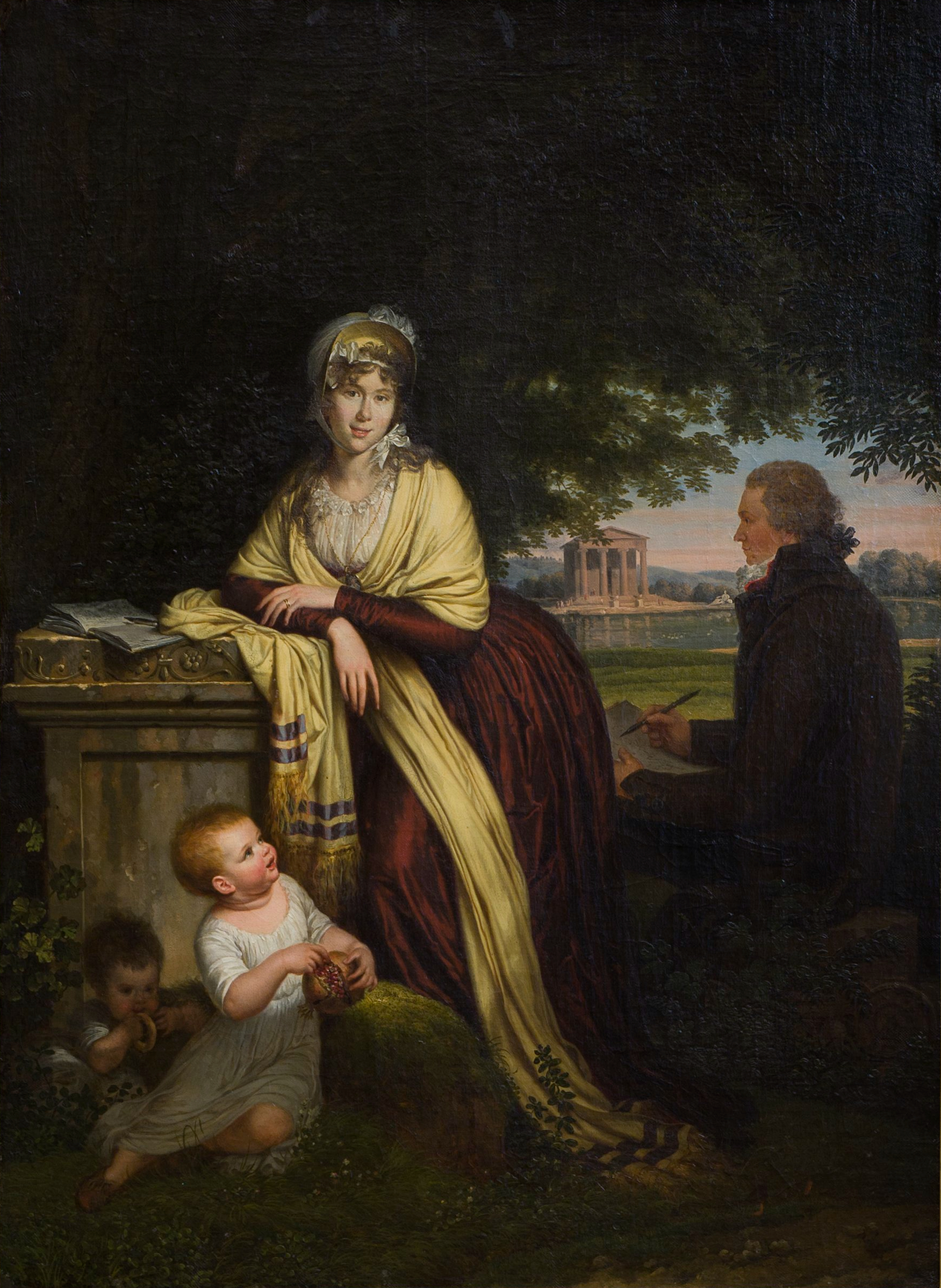
Louis Gauffier's self-portrait with his wife Pauline Châtillon and their children, Louis and Faustina, 1793 (Florence, Palazzo Pitti, Galleria d'arte moderna)

Pauline Gauffier, born Pauline Châtillon (1772–1801), was a French painter established in Italy.

== Biography ==
Born in Rome in 1772 to French parents established in this city, Pauline Châtillon frequented the artistic circles around the French Academy in Rome at the end of the 18th century.

She studied painting with Jean-Germain Drouais and Louis Gauffier.

She married the latter in Rome in March 1790. The couple had two children, including the future Italian miniaturist painter Faustina Malfatti (1792–1837).

Following anti-French demonstrations in Rome, the Gauffier family fled to Florence, where Pauline, in poor health, died in July 1801. Her husband, whose health had always been very weak, "followed her to the grave".

The architect Charles Percier made five sketches of her.

== Works ==
Works

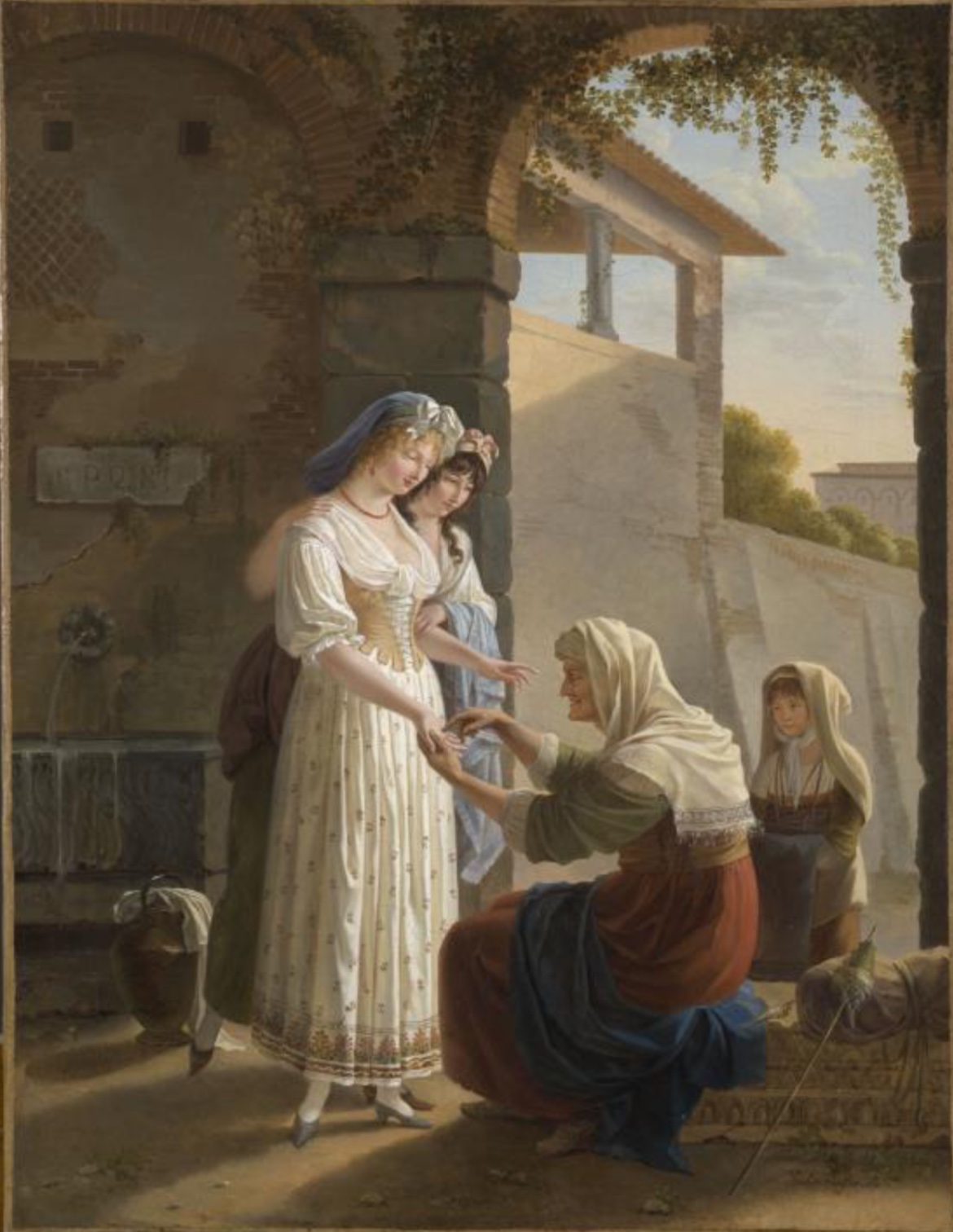
L’Horoscope tiré, 1798 (Dijon, musée Magnin)

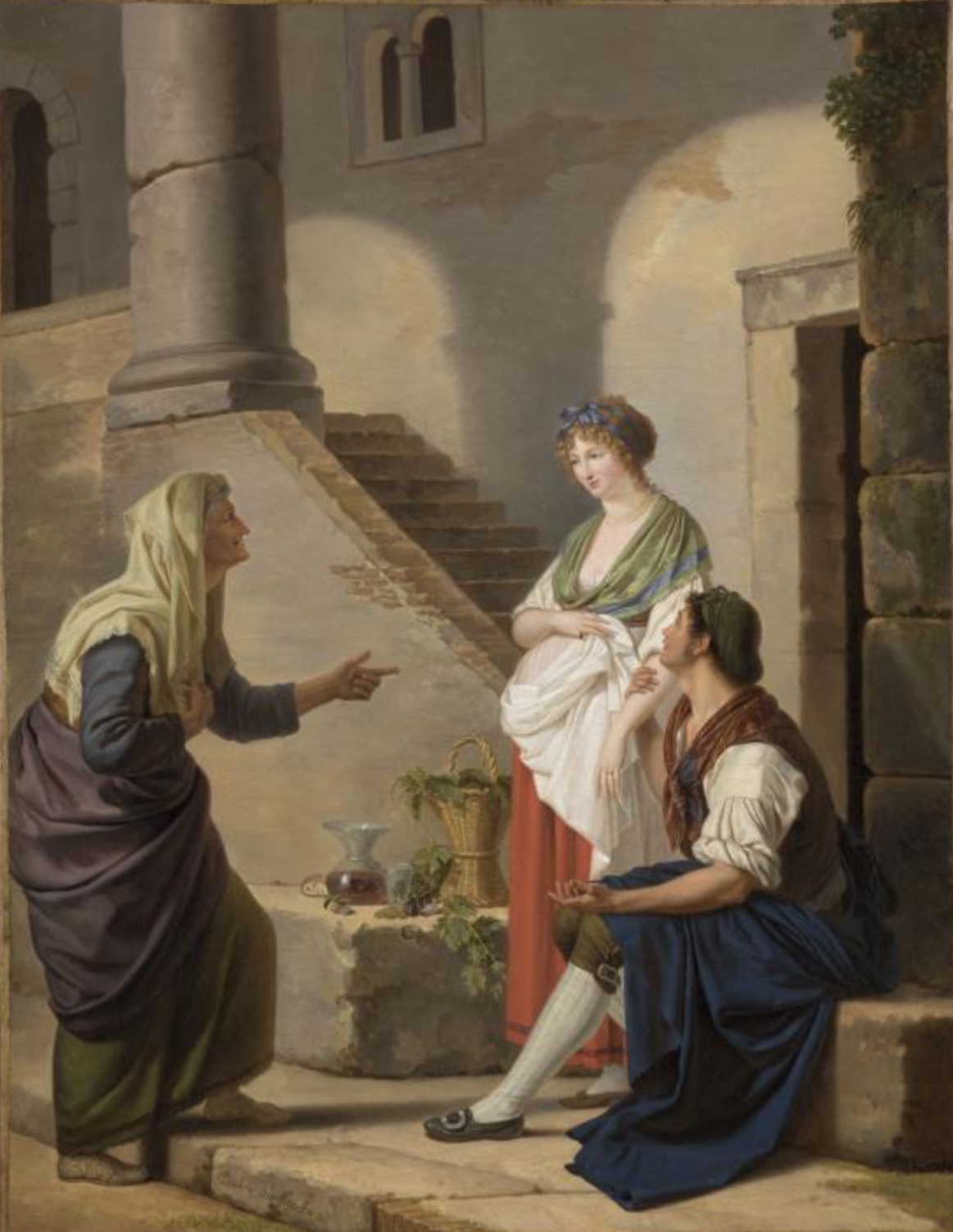
L’Horoscope réalisé, 1798 (Dijon, musée Magnin)

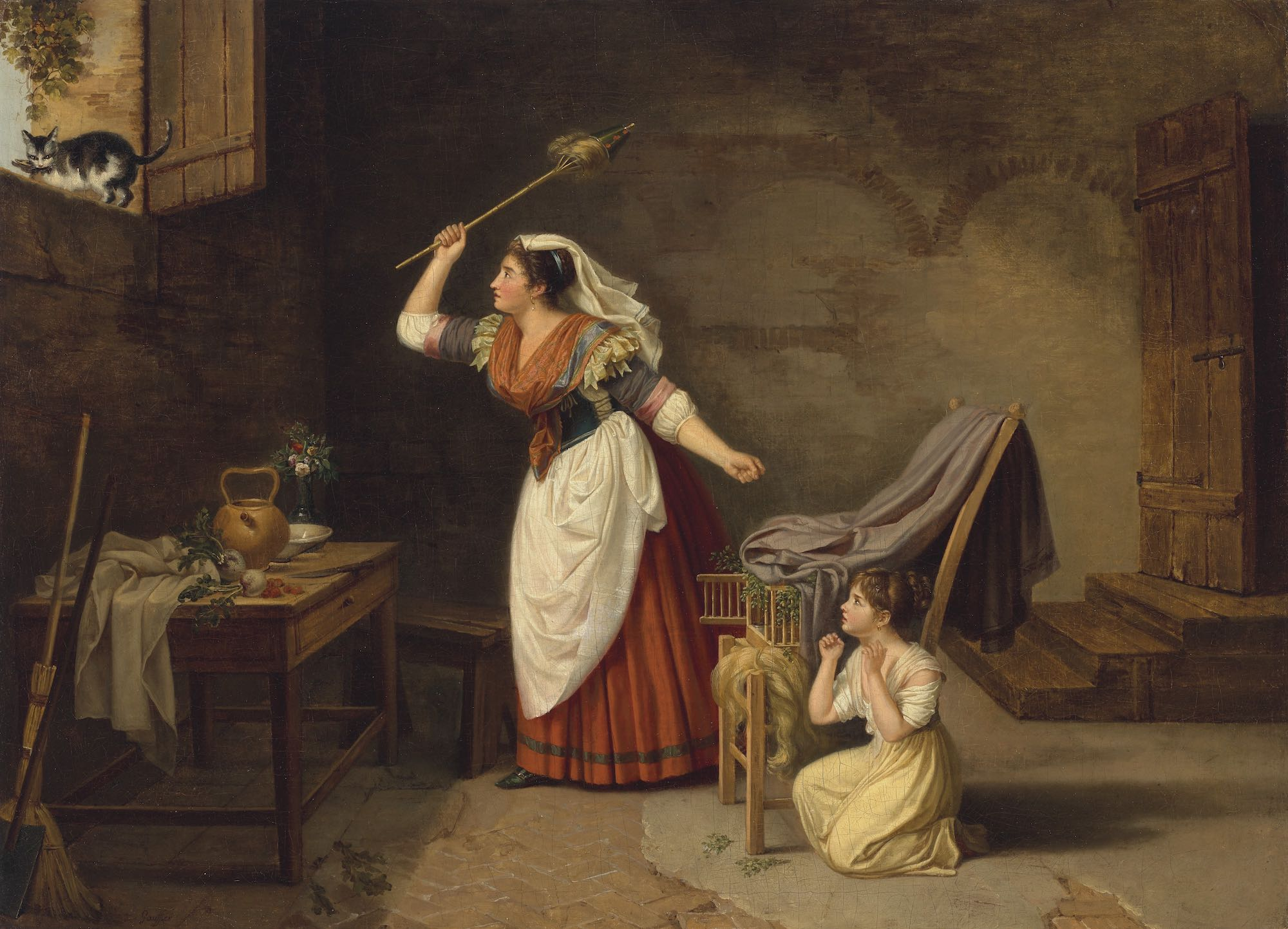
L’Oiseau volé, ca. 1790–1800 (Montpellier, musée Fabre)
