= Louis Gauffier =

French painter (1762–1801)

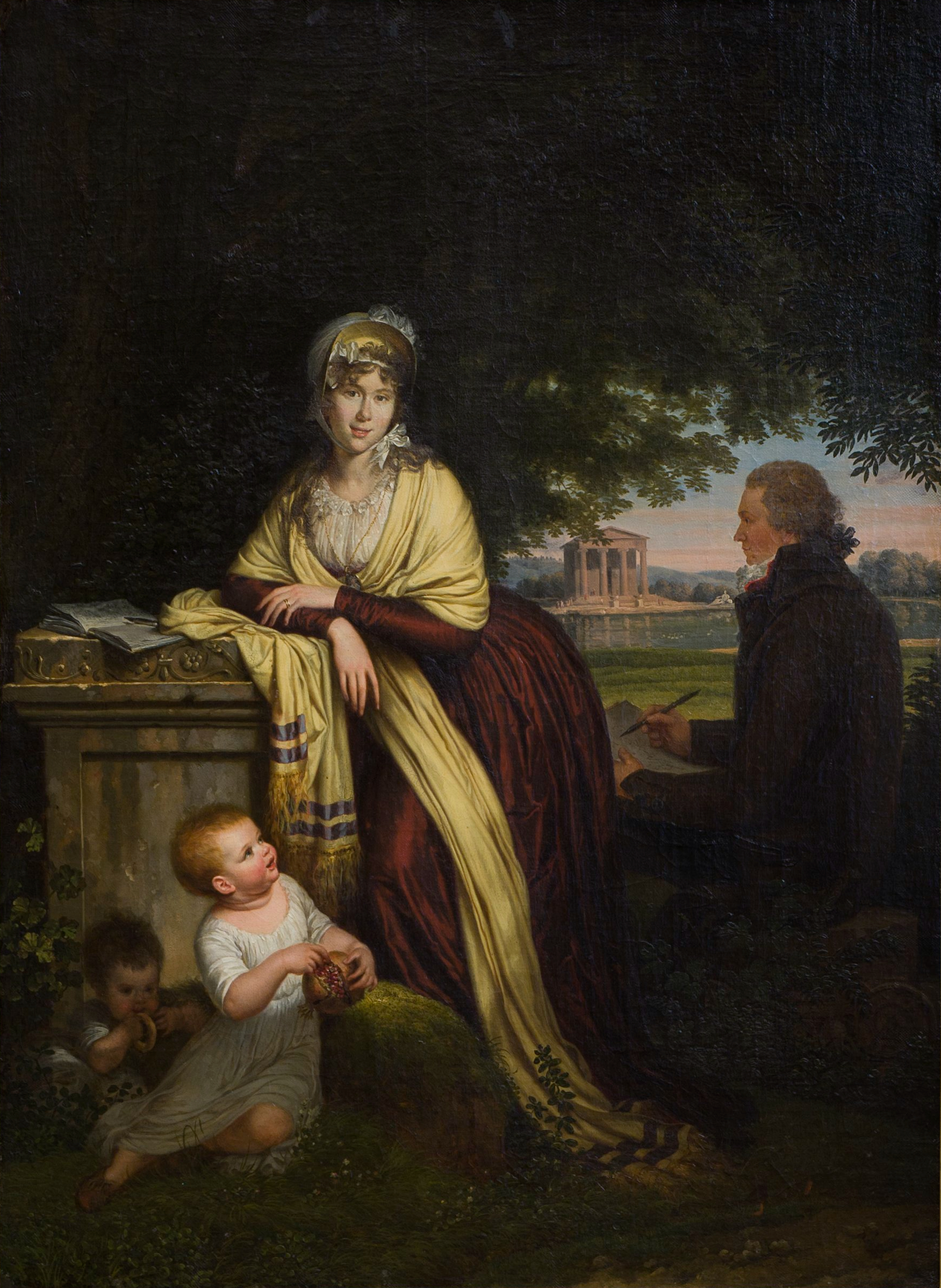
Louis Gauffier's self-portrait with his wife Pauline Châtillon and their children, Louis and Faustina, 1793 (Florence, Palazzo Pitti, Galleria d'arte moderna)

Louis Gauffier (1762–1801) was a French painter. Born in Poitiers, he studied in Paris with the history painter Hughes Taraval before entering the Prix de Rome competition which he won in 1779 for Christ and the Woman of Canaan. Apart from a brief return to Paris in 1789 he remained in Italy for the remainder of his life.

In March 1790, he married his pupil Pauline Chatillon, who was herself a well-known painter. They had two children, one of whom became the Italian miniaturist painter Faustina Malfatti (1792–1837).

Gauffier initially settled in Rome, but popular unrest following the execution of Louis XVI led him to flee with his wife to Florence. He could not receive patronage from France because he was branded a royalist, and this curtailed his career as a history painter. Instead, he painted landscapes, which he sold to English tourists. When French troops occupied Florence in 1799, he began to paint officers' portraits.

Gauffier died in Livorno (Tuscany) in 1801.

An exhibition devoted to his work opened at the Musée Fabre in Montpellier in May 2022 to run until September. It was scheduled for Poitiers in October 2022 to February 2023.

== Works ==
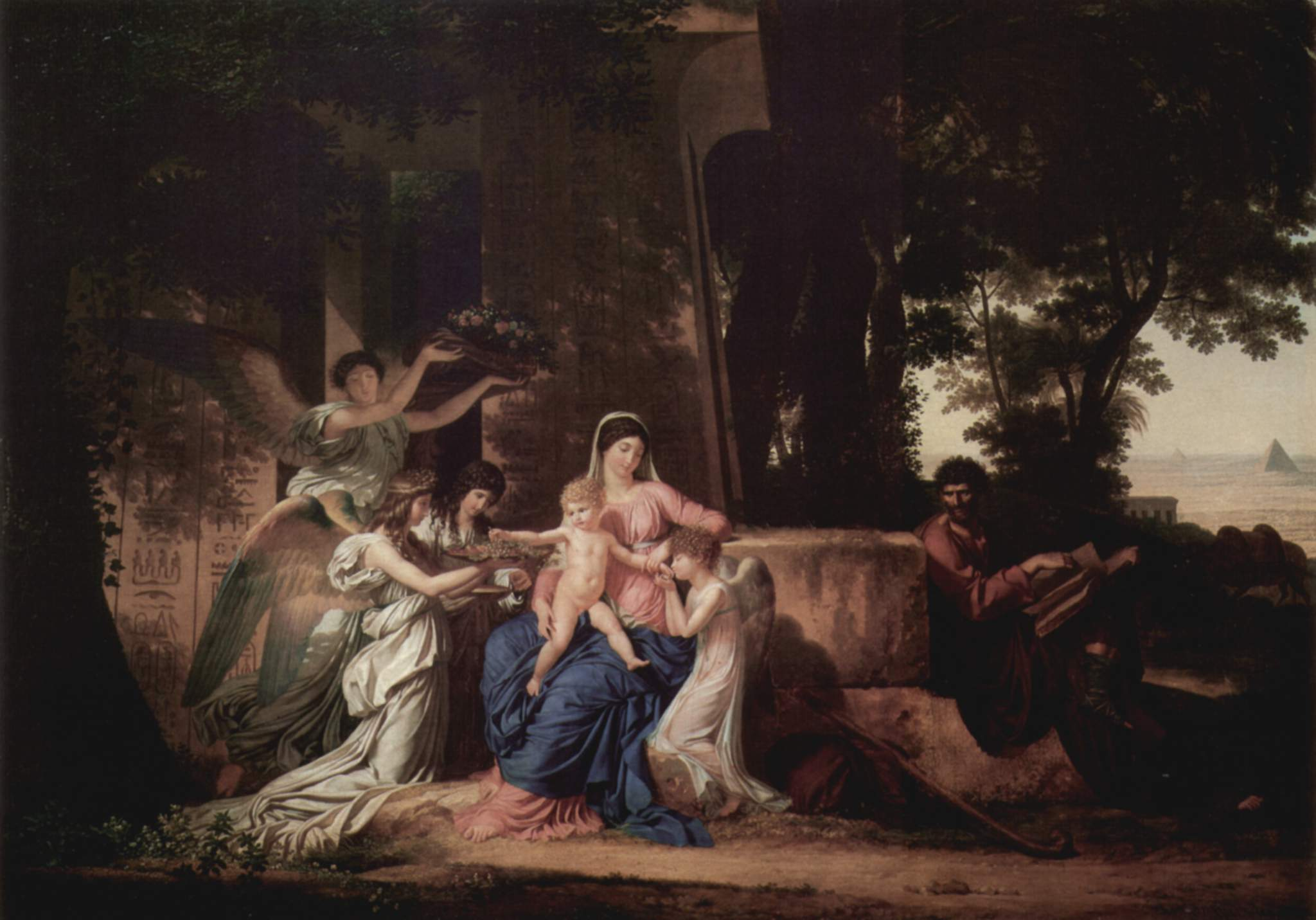
Rest on the Flight into Egypt, oil on canvas. (1793)

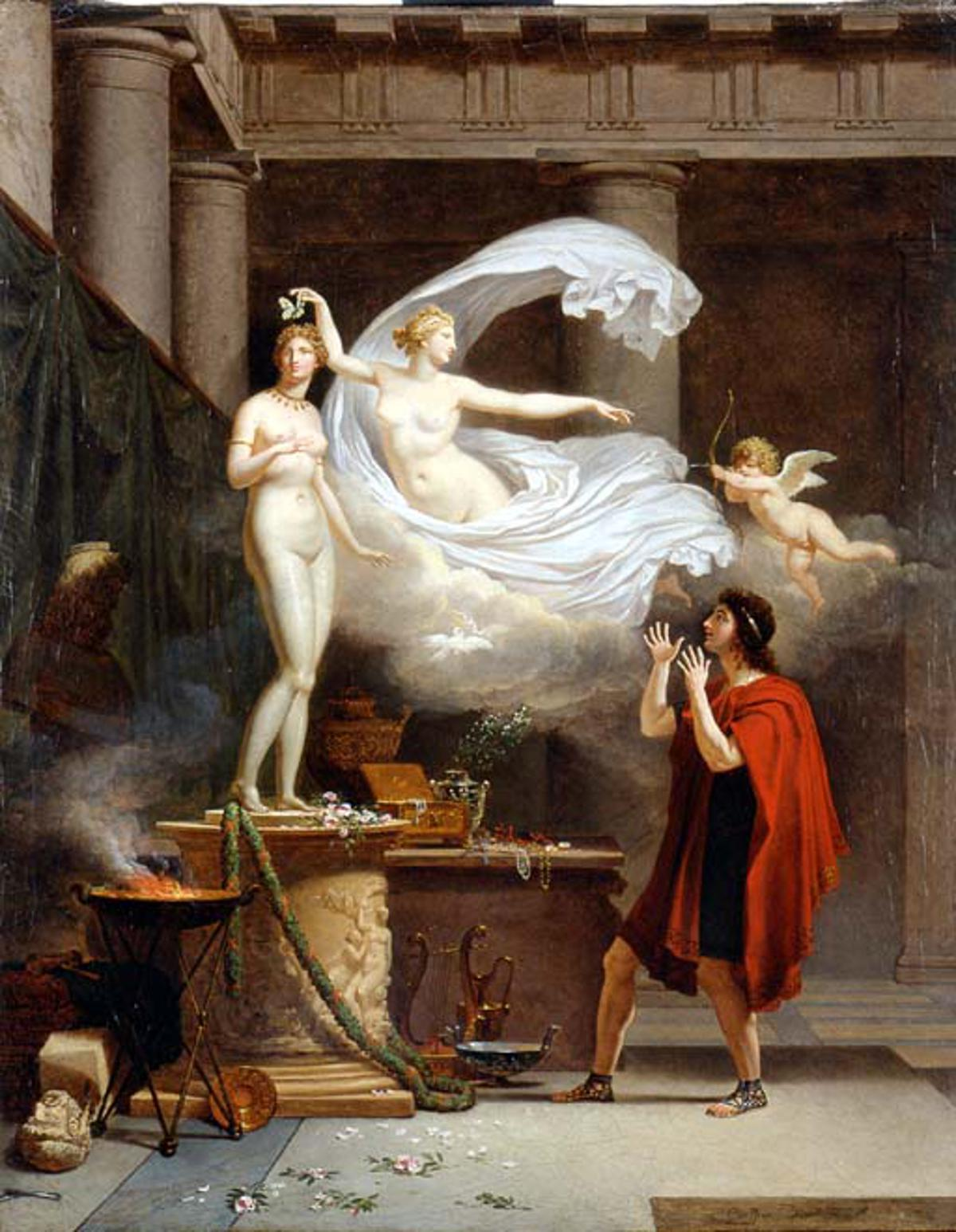
Pygmalion and Galatea (1797)

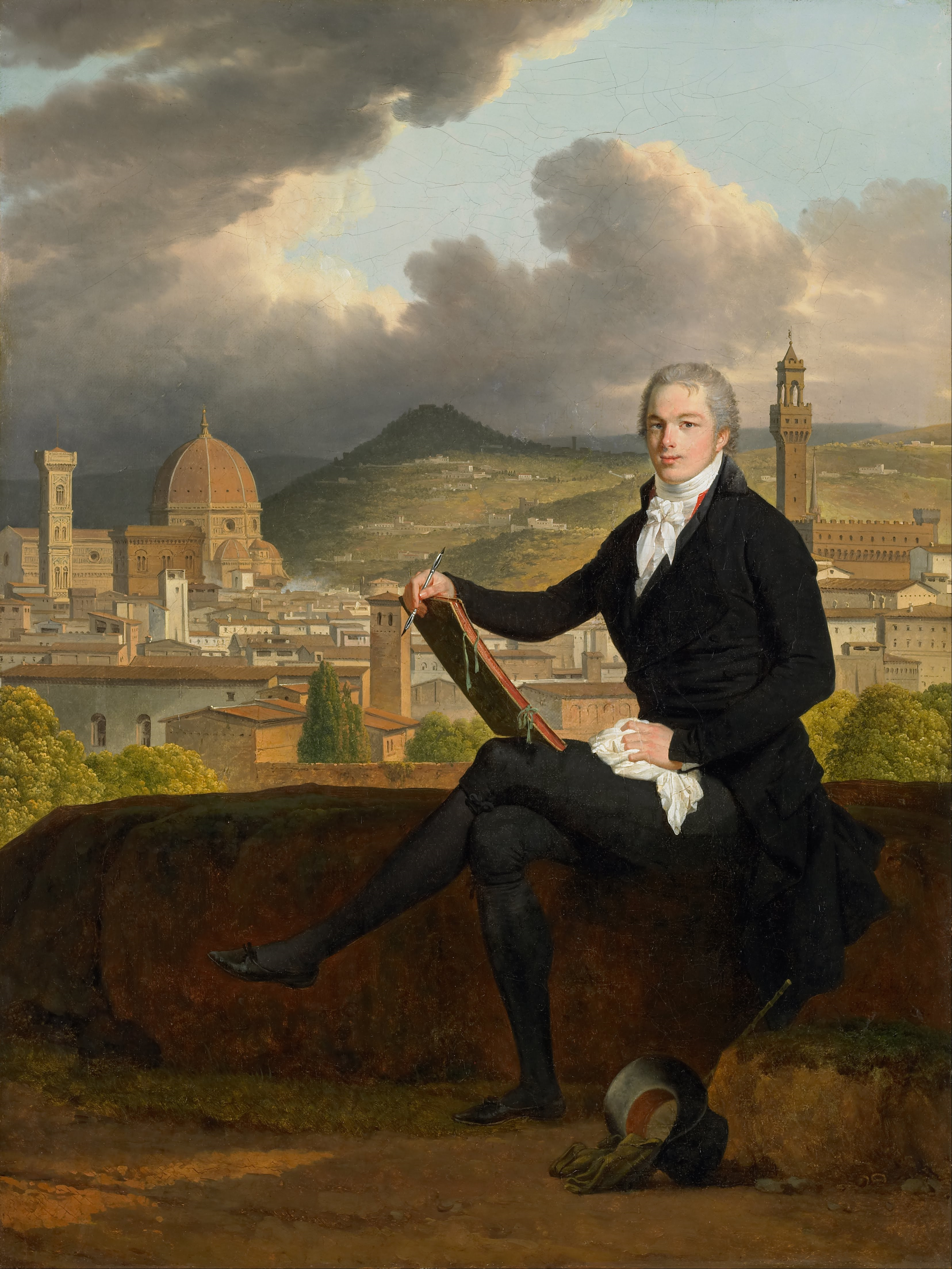
Portrait of Dr. Thomas Penrose, oil on canvas. (1798)

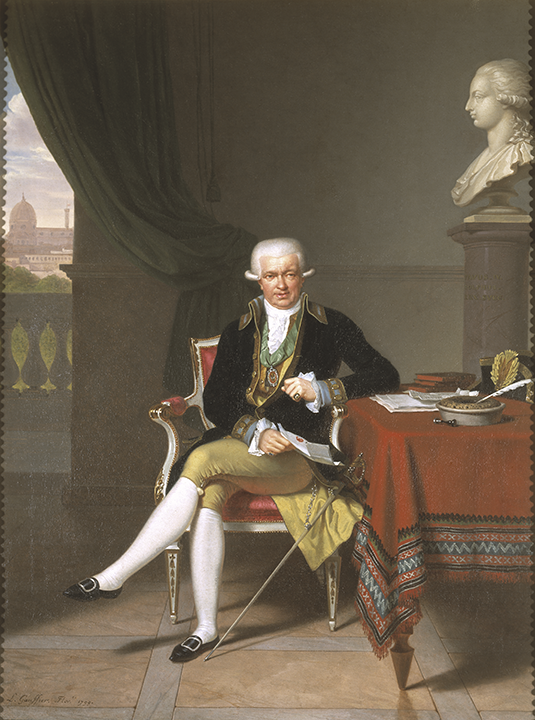
Sweden's minister at the "Courts of Italy" (1793-1836), Johan Claes Lagersvärd, painted in Swedish diplomatic uniform with the Royal Order of Vasa around his neck. In the background is a bust of king Gustav IV Adolf, and through the window one can see Florence Cathedral. (1799)
