= Bénigne Gagneraux =

French painter

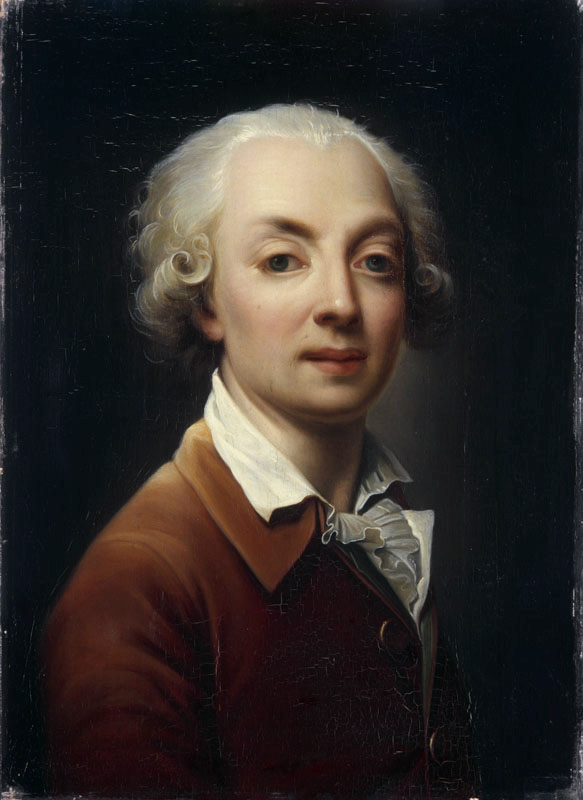
Benigne Gagneraux, Self-portrait, 1793-1795 (19th-century copy)

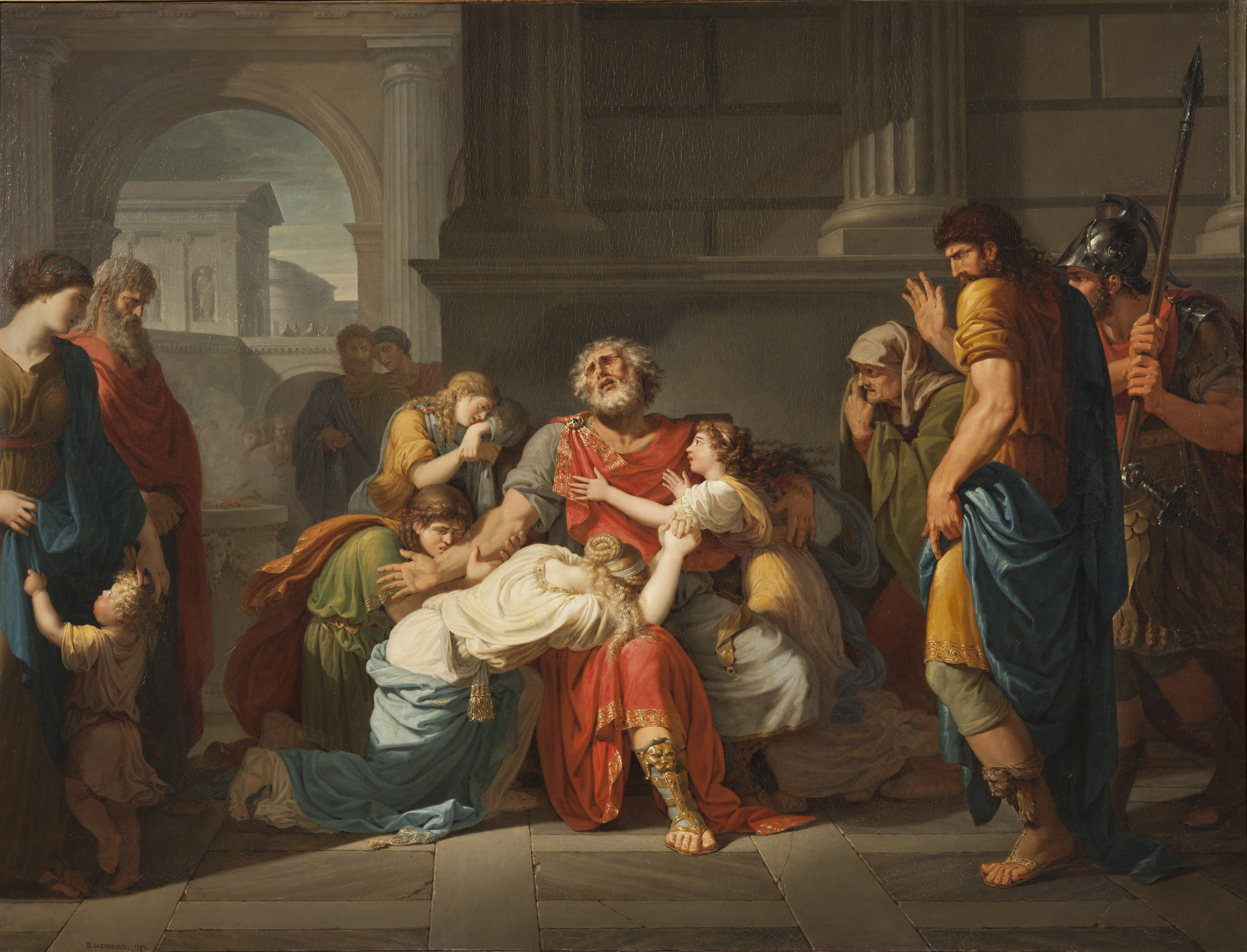
The blind Oedipus commending his children to the Gods, 1784, now in the Nationalmuseum in Stockholm

Bénigne Gagneraux (1756 at Dijon – 1795), was first instructed in the school at Dijon under François Devosge, from whence he proceeded to Rome, where he acquired a reputation by his picture of the Meeting of Gustavus III. of Sweden with Pope Pius VI., which is now in the King's Palace at Stockholm. In the Dijon Museum are pictures of Soranus and Servilius, Battle of Senef, Passage of the Rhine by the French Army under Condé, a Bacchanal, a Cavalry Charge, and a Triumph of Neptune. Owing to the disturbances in Rome he quit that city, and retired to Florence, where he died in 1795. In the Uffizi at Florence are his own portrait, a Battle Scene, and a Lion Hunt.

== Bibliographie ==
- Pierre Rosenberg (dir.), Frederick Cummings, Robert Rosenblum et Antoine Schnapper, De David à Delacroix : La peinture française de 1774 à 1830, Paris, Éditions des musées nationaux, 1974, 702 p. (ISBN 2-7118-0002-4, notice BnF no FRBNF34574367).
- Sylvain Laveissière, Bénigne Gagneraux (1756-1795) : un peintre bourguignon dans la Rome néo-classique, Éditions De Luca, 1983.
